= Baháʼí Faith in Asia =

The Baháʼí Faith was founded by Baháʼu'lláh, in Iran who faced a series of exiles and imprisonment that moved him to Baghdad, Istanbul, and Palestine. By the 1950s, about a century after its forming, Iran remained home to the vast majority of adherents to the Baháʼí Faith. Expansive teaching efforts began in the late 19th century and gained converts in other parts of Asia. By 1968, according to official Baháʼí statistics, the majority of Baháʼís (~75%) lived outside of Iran and North America, the two most prominent centers of the religion previously.

In 1956 there were only three Baháʼí National Spiritual Assemblies in Asia: Iran, Iraq, and India. By 1967 the total was 15, and by 2001 there were 39 National Spiritual Assemblies in Asia.

A Baháʼí House of Worship known as the Lotus Temple was completed in Delhi, India, in 1986, and another was completed in 2017 in Battambang, Cambodia. The design for a House of Worship in Bihar Sharif, Bihar, India, was unveiled in 2020. The Baháʼí World Centre, site of the Universal House of Justice (the governing body of the Baháʼí Faith) and other Baháʼí administrative buildings and holy places, is located in Israel.

Baháʼís have faced severe persecution in Iran, as well as varying degrees of persecution in Turkmenistan, Uzbekistan, Iraq, Yemen, Qatar, Vietnam, Indonesia, and Afghanistan.

== Central Asia ==
=== Kazakhstan ===
The Baháʼí Faith in Kazakhstan began during the policy of oppression of religion in the former Soviet Union. Before that time, Kazakhstan, as part of the Russian Empire, would have had indirect contact with the Baháʼí Faith as far back as 1847. By 1994 the National Spiritual Assembly of Kazakhstan was elected Following the entrance of pioneers the community grew by 2001 to be the religion with the third-most registered religious organizations in the country, after Islam and Christianity.

=== Tajikistan ===
There are an estimated 1,000 Baháʼís in Tajikistan.

=== Turkmenistan ===
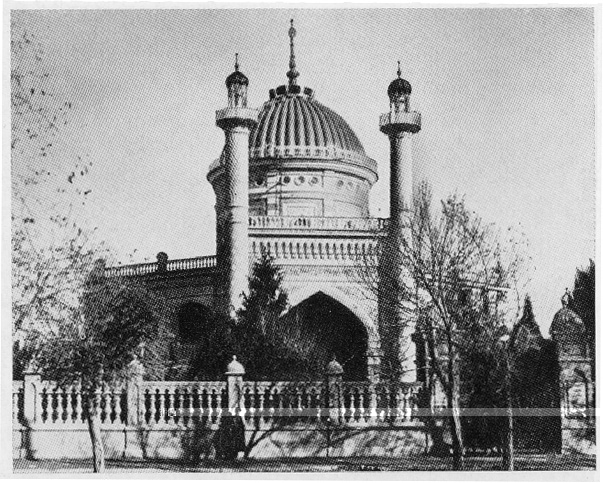
The first Baháʼí House of Worship was built in Ashgabat, Turkmenistan.

The Baháʼí Faith in Turkmenistan begins before Russian advances into the region when the area was under the influence of Persia. By 1887 a community of Baháʼí refugees from religious violence in Persia had made a religious center in Ashgabat. Shortly afterwards – by 1894 – Russia made Turkmenistan part of the Russian Empire. While the Baháʼí Faith spread across the Russian Empire and attracted the attention of scholars and artists, the Baháʼí community in Ashgabat built the first Baháʼí House of Worship, elected one of the first Baháʼí local administrative institutions and was a center of scholarship. However, during the Soviet period religious persecution made the Baháʼí community almost disappear – however Baháʼís who moved into the regions in the 1950s did identify individuals still adhering to the religion. Following the dissolution of the Soviet Union in late 1991, Baháʼí communities and their administrative bodies started to develop across the nations of the former Soviet Union; In 1994 Turkmenistan elected its own National Spiritual Assembly however laws passed in 1995 in Turkmenistan required 500 adult religious adherents in each locality for registration and no Baháʼí community in Turkmenistan could meet this requirement. As of 2007 the religion had still failed to reach the minimum number of adherents to register and individuals have had their homes raided for Baháʼí literature.

=== Uzbekistan ===
The Baháʼí Faith in Uzbekistan began in the lifetime of Baháʼu'lláh, the founder of the religion. Circa 1918 there was an estimated 1900 Baháʼís in Tashkent. By the period of the policy of oppression of religion in the former Soviet Union the communities shrank away – by 1963 in the entire USSR there were about 200 Baháʼís. Little is known until the 1980s when the Baháʼí Faith started to grow across the Soviet Union again. In 1991 a Baháʼí National Spiritual Assembly of the Soviet Union was elected but was quickly split among its former members. In 1992, a regional National Spiritual Assembly for the whole of Central Asia was formed with its seat in Ashgabat. In 1994 the National Spiritual Assembly of Uzbekistan was elected. In 2008 eight Baháʼí Local Spiritual Assemblies or smaller groups had registered with the government though more recently there were also raids and expulsions.

== East Asia ==
=== China ===
The Baháʼí Faith was first introduced in China during the lifetime of its founder, Baháʼu'lláh. The first record of a Baháʼí living in China is of a Persian, Hájí Mírzá Muhammad-ʼAlí, who lived in Shanghai from 1862 to 1868. In 1928 the first Local Spiritual Assembly in China was formed in Shanghai.

As China expanded its reform efforts and increased its interactions with the worldwide community, more Baháʼís moved to China.

The Baháʼí Faith in China has still not matured to the same point as in many other countries of the world where there is an established structure to administer its affairs. As a result of the lack of formal registration and structure, it is difficult to ascertain with some degree of certainty, the number of Baháʼís in China. The number of active followers of Baháʼu'lláh's Teachings in China has spread beyond the scope of knowledge of the existing administrative structures. Certainly there are active followers of the teachings of Baháʼu'lláh in all of the major cities of China and in many regional centers and rural areas.

Good working relationships have been developed with China's State Administration for Religious Affairs (SARA).

According to Albert Cheung, many aspects of Baháʼu'lláh's teachings correspond closely to traditional Chinese religious and philosophical beliefs, such as: 1) the Great Unity (world peace); 2) unity of the human family; 3) service to others; 4) moral education; 5) extended family values; 6) the investigation of truth; 7) the Highest Reality (God); 8) the common foundation of religions; 9) harmony in Nature; 10) the purpose of tests and suffering; and 11) moderation in all things.

==== Hong Kong ====
Hong Kong has a long history of Baha'i activity being the second location in China with Baha'is. Two brothers moved there in 1870 and established a long-running export business. Hong Kong did not have its first Local Spiritual Assembly until 1956 and then formed a National Spiritual Assembly in 1974. This was allowed because of Hong Kong's status at that time as similar to a sovereign nation and also due to the growth of the religion there. In 1997 sovereignty of Hong Kong was transferred to the People's Republic of China and it operates as a Special Administrative Area of China. The coordinating Spiritual Assembly there is no longer considered a "National" Spiritual Assembly but it still operates in a similar manner coordinating the activities of a very vibrant Baha'i community. In 2005 the Association of Religion Data Archives (relying mostly on World Christian Encyclopedia) estimated the Baháʼí population of Hong Kong at about 1,100.

==== Macau ====
The Baháʼí Faith was established in Macao (also spelled Macau) much later (in 1953) than in other parts of China, most likely due to the unique conditions of Macao being a Portuguese colony until 1999 and it being somewhat in the shadow of Hong Kong and larger centers in mainland China like Shanghai. Macao formed its first Local Spiritual Assembly in 1958 and then formed a National Spiritual Assembly in 1989. In 1999 sovereignty of Macao was transferred to the People's Republic of China and it operates as a Special Administrative Area of China. The coordinating Spiritual Assembly there is no longer considered a "National" Spiritual Assembly but it still operates in a similar manner coordinating the activities of a Baháʼí community which is estimated at 2,500 and which is considered one of the five major religions of Macao.

=== Japan ===
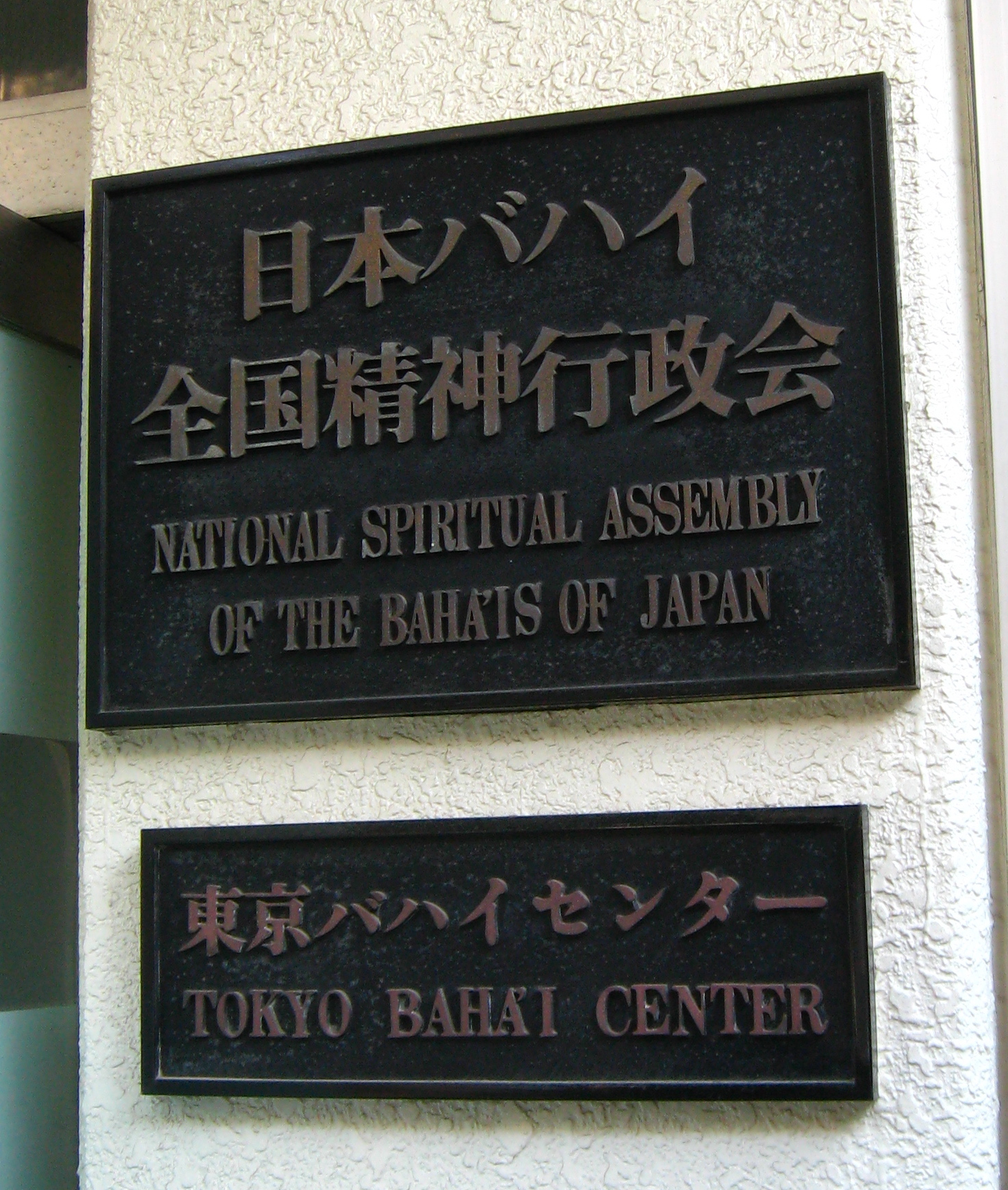
Sign outside the Tokyo Baha'i Center, Shinjuku Ward.

The Baháʼí Faith was first introduced to Japan after mentions of the country by ʻAbdu'l-Bahá first in 1875. Japanese contact with the religion came from the West when Kanichi Yamamoto (山本寛一) was living in Honolulu, Hawaii in 1902 converted; the second being Saichiro Fujita (藤田左弌郎).

In 1914 two Baháʼís, George Jacob Augur and Agnes Alexander, and their families, pioneered to Japan. Alexander would live some 31 years off and on in Japan until 1967 when she left for the last time The first Baháʼí convert on Japanese soil was Kikutaro Fukuta (福田菊太郎) in 1915. ʻAbdu'l-Bahá undertook several trips in 1911-1912 and met Japanese travelers in Western cities, in Paris, London, and New York. ʻAbdu'l-Bahá met Fujita in Chicago and Yamamoto in San Francisco.

ʻAbdu'l-Bahá wrote a series of letters, or tablets, in 1916-1917 compiled together in the book titled Tablets of the Divine Plan but which was not presented in the United States until 1919. Fujita would serve between the World Wars first in the household of ʻAbdu'l-Bahá and then of Shoghi Effendi. In 1932 the first Baháʼí Local Spiritual Assembly was elected in Tokyo and reelected in 1933. In all of Japan there were 19 Baháʼís.

In 1937 Alexander went on Baháʼí pilgrimage to return years later. In 1938 Fujita was excused from his services in Haifa out of fears for his safety during World War II and returned to Japan until 1956. In 1942, back in the United States, the Yamamoto family lived at a relocation camp during the war. Baháʼí Americans associated with the American Occupation Forces reconnected the Japanese Baháʼí community – Michael Jamir found Fujita by 1946 and Robert Imagire helped re-elect the assembly in Tokyo in 1948. In 1963 the statistics of Baháʼí communities showed 13 assemblies and other smaller groups.

In 1968 Japanese Baháʼís began to travel outside Japan. In 1971 the first residents of Okinawa converted to the religion. In 1991 the community organized an affiliate of the Association for Baháʼí Studies in Japan which has since held annual conferences, published newsletters, and published and coordinated academic work across affiliates. The Association of Religion Data Archives (relying on World Christian Encyclopedia) estimated some 15,650 Baháʼís in 2005 while the CIA World Factbook estimated about 12,000 Japanese Baháʼís in 2006.

=== Mongolia ===
The Baháʼí Faith in Mongolia dates back only to the 1980s and 1990s, as prior to that point Mongolia's Communist anti-religious stance impeded the spread of the religion to that country. The first Baháʼí arrived in Mongolia in 1988, and the religion established a foothold there, later establish a Local Spiritual Assembly in that nation. In 1994, the Baháʼís elected their first National Spiritual Assembly. Though the Association of Religion Data Archives estimated only some 50 Baháʼís in 2005 more than 1700 Mongolian Baháʼís turned out for a regional conference in 2009. In July 1989 Sean Hinton became the first Baháʼí to reside in Mongolia, was named a Knight of Baháʼu'lláh, and the last name to be entered on the Roll of Honor at the Shrine of Baháʼu'lláh.

=== North Korea ===
Baháʼís originally entered the Korean Peninsula in 1921 before the Division of Korea. Both 2005 data from the Association of Religion Data Archives (relying on the World Christian Encyclopedia for adherents estimates) and independent research agree there are no Baháʼís in North Korea.

=== South Korea ===
According to a member of the South Korean Baháʼí community, there are approximately 200 active Baháʼís in South Korea.

=== Taiwan ===
The Baháʼí Faith in Taiwan began after the religion entered areas of China and nearby Japan. The first Baháʼís arrived in Taiwan in 1949 and the first of these to have become a Baháʼí was Mr. Jerome Chu (Chu Yao-lung) in 1945 while visiting the United States. By May 1955 there were eighteen Baháʼís in six localities across Taiwan. The first Local Spiritual Assembly in Taiwan was elected in Tainan in 1956. The National Spiritual Assembly was first elected in 1967 when there were local assemblies in Taipei, Tainan, Hualien, and Pingtung. Circa 2006 the Baháʼís showed up in the national census with 16,000 members and 13 assemblies.

== Middle East ==
=== Bahrain ===
The Baháʼí Faith in Bahrain begins with a precursor movement, the Shaykhís coming out of Bahrain into Iran. Abu'l-Qásim Faizi and wife lived in Bahrain in the 1940s. Around 1963 the first Local Spiritual Assembly of Bahrain was elected in the capital of Manama. In the 1980s, many anti-Baháʼí polemics were published in local newspapers of the Bahrain. Recent estimates count some 1,000 Baháʼís or 0.2% of the national population or a little more by Association of Religion Data Archives estimated there were some 2,832 Baháʼís in 2010. According to the Bahraini government the combined percentage of Christians, Jews, Hindus and Baháʼís is 0.2%.

=== Iran ===
Estimates for number of Baháʼís in Iran in the early 21st century vary between 150,000 and 500,000. During the Iranian Revolution of 1979 and the subsequent few years, a significant number of Baháʼís left the country during intense persecution of Baháʼís. Estimates before and after the revolution vary greatly.

- Eliz Sanasarian writes in Religious Minorities in Iran that "Estimating the number of Baháʼís in Iran has always been difficult due to their persecution and strict adherence to secrecy. The reported number of Baháʼís in Iran has ranged anywhere from the outrageously high figure of 500,000 to the low number of 150,000. The number 300,000 has been mentioned most frequently, especially for the mid- to late- 1970s, but it is not reliable. Roger Cooper gives an estimate of between 150,000 and 300,000."
- The Encyclopedia of the Modern Middle East and North Africa (2004) states that "In Iran, by 1978, the Baháʼí community numbered around 300,000."
- The Columbia Encyclopedia (5th edition, 1993) reports that "Prior to the Iranian Revolution there were about 1 million Iranian Baháʼís."
- The Encyclopedia of Islam (new edition, 1960) reports that "In Persia, where different estimates of their number vary from more than a million down to about 500,000. [in 1958]"

=== Iraq ===
A 1970 law prohibits the Baháʼí Faith in Iraq. A 1975 regulation forbade the issuance of national identity cards to Baháʼís until it was rescinded in 2007, but after only a few identity cards were issued to Baháʼís, their issuance was again halted. According to Bahá’í leaders in Iraq, their community numbers less than 2,000 in that country. The Bahá’í World News Service reported in May 2020 that Bahá’ís in Iraqi Kurdistan were hosting weekly online meetings on how spiritual teachings could shape public life.

=== Israel ===
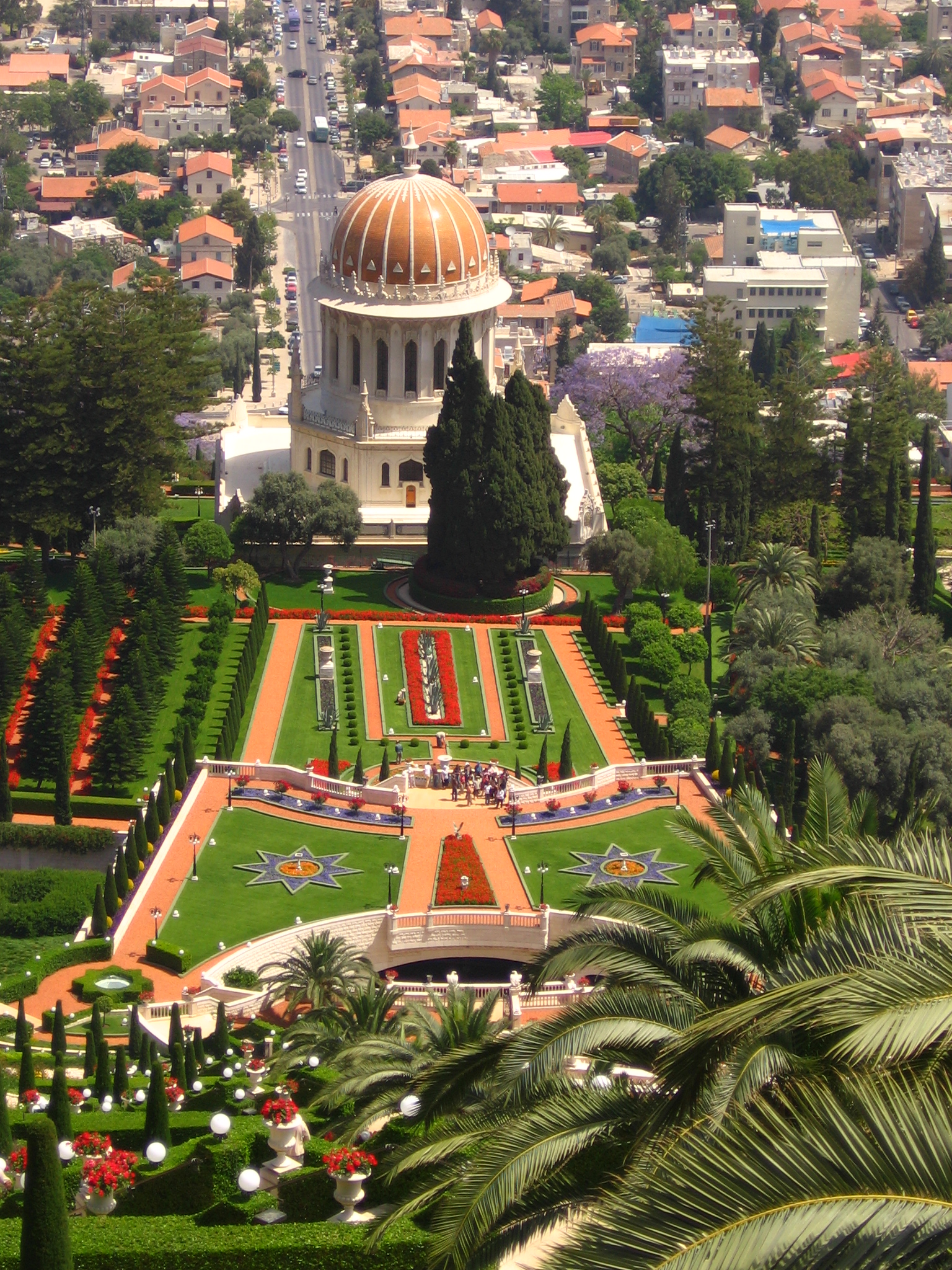
View towards the Shrine of the Báb from the upper Terraces on Mount Carmel, Haifa

The administrative centre of the Baháʼí Faith and the Shrine of the Báb are located at the Baháʼí World Centre in Haifa, and the leader of the religion is buried in Acre. Apart from maintenance staff, there is no Baháʼí community in Israel, although it is a destination for pilgrimages. Baháʼí staff in Israel do not teach their faith to Israelis following strict Baháʼí policy.

=== Lebanon ===
The Baháʼí Faith has a following of at least several hundred people in Lebanon dating back to 1870. The community includes around 400 people, with a centre in Beit Mery, just outside the capital Beirut, and cemeteries in Machgara and Khaldeh. On the other hand, the Association of Religion Data Archives (relying on World Christian Encyclopedia) estimated some 3,900 Baháʼís in 2005.

=== Qatar ===
On 31 March 2021, Qatari authorities blacklisted and deported a prominent Qatar-born Baháʼí, Omid Seioshansian, on "unspecified criminal and national security charges." Over the years many Baháʼís have been blacklisted and deported from Qatar. Once blacklisted, Baháʼís are expelled from the country and are permanently refused reentry. Residency permits of non-Qatari Baháʼís have also been denied, or not renewed.

=== United Arab Emirates ===
The Baháʼí Faith in the United Arab Emirates begins before the specific country gained independence in 1971. The first Baháʼís arrived in Dubai by 1950, and by 1957, there were four Baháʼí Local Spiritual Assemblies in the region of the UAE and a regional National Spiritual Assembly of the Arabian Peninsula. Recent estimates count some 38,364 Baháʼís or 0.5% of the national population.

=== Yemen ===
The Bahá’í Faith in Yemen is a small but active religious community that has been present in the country since the mid-nineteenth century. There are estimated to be a few thousand Bahá’ís in Yemen, including many from Yemeni tribes and prominent families, alongside long-time residents of Persian origin. Despite their small numbers, Yemeni Bahá’ís have contributed to national life through work in health care, engineering, education, reconciliation initiatives, youth development, and humanitarian relief, while facing severe repression—particularly in areas controlled by the Houthi authorities since 2014.

== South Asia ==
=== Afghanistan ===
The history of the Baháʼí Faith in Afghanistan began in the 1880s with visits by Baháʼís. However, it was not until the 1930s that any Baháʼí settled there. A Baháʼí Local Spiritual Assembly was elected in 1948 in Kabul and after some years was re-elected in 1969. Though the population had perhaps reached thousands, under the Soviet invasion of Afghanistan and the harsh rule of the Taliban the Baháʼís lost the right to have any institutions and many fled. According to a 2007 estimate, the Baháʼís in Afghanistan number approximately 400, whereas the Association of Religion Data Archives gave a higher estimate of 15,000 Baháʼís in 2005.

=== Bangladesh ===
The history of the Baháʼí Faith in Bangladesh began previous to its independence when it was part of India. The roots of the Baháʼí Faith in the region go back to the first days of the Bábí religion in 1844. During Baháʼu'lláh's lifetime, as founder of the religion, he encouraged some of his followers to move to India. And it may have been Jamál Effendi who was first sent and stopped in Dhaka more than once. The first Baháʼís in the area that would later become Bangladesh was when a Bengali group from Chittagong accepted the religion while in Burma. By 1950 there were enough members of the religion to elect Baháʼí Local Spiritual Assemblies in Chittagong and Dhaka. The community has contributed to the progress of the nation of Bangladesh individually and collectively and in 2005 the World Christian Encyclopedia estimated the Baháʼí population of Bangladesh about 10,600.

=== India ===
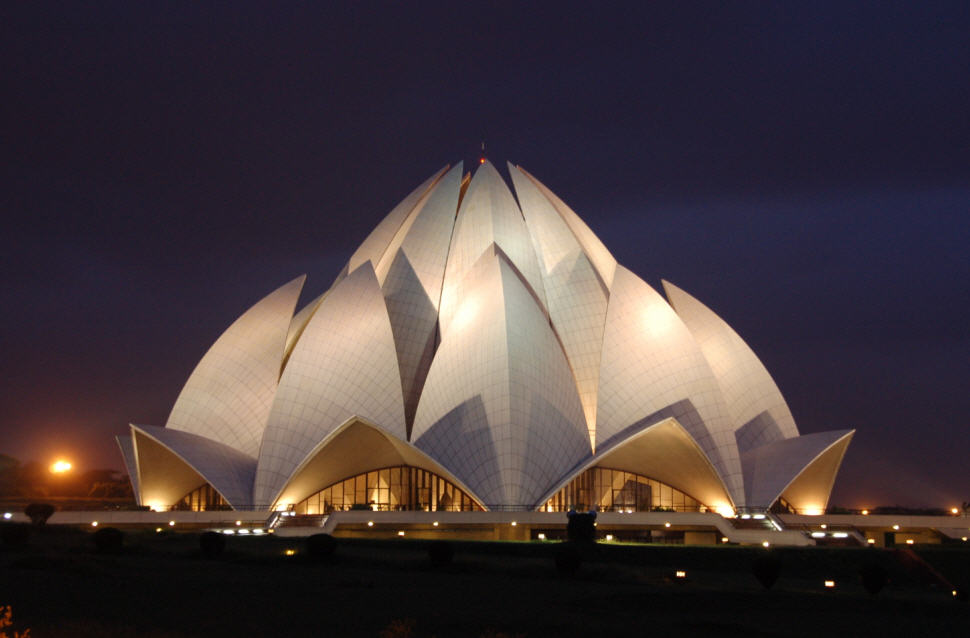
The Baháʼí House of Worship in New Delhi.

The roots of the Baháʼí Faith in India go back to the first days of the religion in 1844. A researcher, William Garlington, characterized the 1960s until present as a time of "Mass Teaching". He suggests that the mentality of the believers in India changed during the later years of Shoghi Effendi's ministry, when they were instructed to accept converts who were illiterate and uneducated. The change brought teaching efforts into the rural areas of India, where the teachings of the unity of humanity attracted many people from lower castes. According to the 2005 Association of Religion Data Archives data there are close to some 1,880,000 Baháʼís; however, the 2011 Census of India recorded only 4,572. The Baháʼí community of India claims a Baháʼí population of over 2 million, the highest official Baháʼí population of any country.

The Bahá'í House of Worship in Bahapur, New Delhi, India was designed by Iranian-American architect Fariborz Sahba and is commonly known as the Lotus Temple. Rúhíyyih Khánum laid the foundation stone on 17 October 1977 and dedicated the temple on 24 December 1986. The total cost was $10 million. The temple has won numerous architectural awards and has been featured in magazines and newspapers. It has also become a major attraction for people of various religions, with up to 100,000 visitors on some Hindu holy days; estimates for the number of visitors annually range from 2.5 million to 5 million. A 2001 a CNN reporter referred to it as the most visited building in the world.

Inspired by the sacred lotus flower, the temple's design is composed of 27 free-standing, marble-clad "petals" grouped into clusters of three and thus forming nine sides. The temple's shape has symbolic and inter-religious significance because the lotus is often associated with the Hindu goddess Lakshmi. Nine doors open on to a central hall with permanent seating for 1,200 people, which can be expanded for a total seating capacity of 2,500 people. The temple rises to a height of 40.8 m and is situated on a 26-acre (105,000 m^{2}; 10.5 ha) property featuring nine surrounding ponds. An educational centre beside the temple was established in 2017.

A design for another House of Worship, in Bihar Sharif, Bihar, India, was unveiled in 2020.

=== Nepal ===
The Baháʼí Faith in Nepal begins after a Nepalese leader encountered the religion in his travels before World War II. Following World War II, the first known Baháʼí to enter Nepal was about 1952 and the first Nepalese Baháʼí Local Spiritual Assembly elected in 1961, and its National Spiritual Assembly in 1972. For a period of time, between 1976 and 1981, all assemblies were dissolved due to legal restrictions. The 2001 census reported 1,211 Baháʼís, and since the 1990s the Baháʼí community of Nepal has been involved in a number of interfaith organizations including the Inter-religious Council of Nepal promoting peace in the country. In 2023, the Universal House of Justice announced plans for the construction of a local Bahá’í House of Worship in Nepal.

=== Pakistan ===
The Baháʼí Faith in Pakistan begins previous to its independence when it was part of India. The roots of the Baháʼí Faith in the region go back to the first days of the Bábí religion in 1844 especially with Shaykh Sa'id Hindi – one of the Letters of the Living who was from Multan. During Baháʼu'lláh's lifetime, as founder of the religion, he encouraged some of his followers to move to the area. Jamal Effendi visited Karachi in 1875 on one of his trips to parts of Southern Asia. Muhammad Raza Shirazi became a Baháʼí in Mumbai in 1908 and may have been the first Baháʼí to settle, pioneer, in Karachi. National coordinated activities across India began and reached a peak by the December 1920, first All-India Baháʼí Convention, held in Mumbai for three days. Representatives from India's major religious communities were present as well as Baháʼí delegates from throughout the country. In 1921, the Baháʼís of Karachi elected their first Baháʼí Local Spiritual Assembly. In 1923, still as part of India, a regional National Spiritual Assembly was formed for all India and Burma which then included the area now part of Pakistan. From 1931 to 1933, Professor Pritam Singh, the first Baháʼí from a Sikh background, settled in Lahore and published an English-language weekly called The Bahaʼi Weekly and other initiatives. A Baháʼí publishing committee was established in Karachi in 1935. This body evolved and is registered as the Bahaʼi Publishing Trust of Pakistan. In 1937, John Esslemont's Baháʼu'lláh and the New Era was translated into Urdu and Gujrati in Karachi. The committee also published scores of Baháʼí books and leaflets in many languages. The local assemblies spread across many cities and in 1957, East and West Pakistan elected a separate national assembly from India and in 1971, East Pakistan became Bangladesh with its own national assembly. Waves of refugees came from the Soviet Union invasion of Afghanistan and the Islamic Revolutionin Iran and later from the Taliban. Some of these people were able to return home, some stayed, and others moved on. In Pakistan the Baháʼís have had the right to hold public meetings, establish academic centers, teach their faith, and elect their administrative councils. However, the government prohibits Baháʼís from traveling to Israel to have Baháʼí pilgrimage. Nevertheless, Baháʼís in Pakistan set up a school and most of the students were not Baháʼís. as well as other projects addressing the needs of Pakistan. And the religion continues to grow and in 2004 the Baháʼís of Lahore began seeking for a new Baháʼí cemetery. The World Christian Encyclopedia estimated over 78,000 Baháʼís lived in Pakistan in 2000 though Baháʼís claimed less than half that number.

=== Sri Lanka ===
A Baháʼí doctor known as Dr. Luqmani established a medical practice in Sri Lanka in 1949. In 2017, it was reported that there were about 5,000 Baháʼís in Sri Lanka.

== Southeast Asia ==
=== Cambodia ===
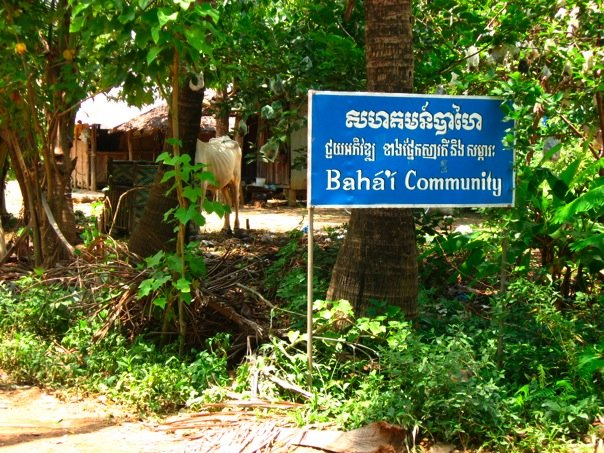
A sign in Battambang, in an area with a high concentration of Baháʼí followers.

The introduction of the Baháʼí Faith in Cambodia first occurred in the 1920s, not long after French Indochina was mentioned by ʻAbdu'l-Bahá as a potential destination for Baháʼí teachers. After sporadic visits from travelling teachers throughout the first half of the 20th century, the first Baháʼí group in Cambodia was established in Phnom Penh in 1956, with the arrival of Baháʼí teachers from India. During the rule of the Khmer Rouge in the late 1970s, all effective contact with the Cambodian Baháʼís was lost. The efforts of Baháʼí teachers working in Cambodian refugee camps in Thailand led to the establishment of Local Spiritual Assemblies among the survivors of the Khmer Rouge's campaign of genocide. The Baháʼí community has recently seen a return to growth, especially in the city of Battambang; in 2009, the city was host to one of 41 Baháʼí regional conferences, and in 2012, the Universal House of Justice announced plans to establish a local Baháʼí House of Worship there. According to a 2010 estimate, Cambodia is home to approximately 10,000 Baháʼís.

The Battambang temple was the world's first local Baháʼí House of Worship to be completed. The temple was designed by Cambodian architect Sochet Vitou Tang, who is a practicing Buddhist, and integrates distinctive Cambodian architectural principles. A dedication ceremony and official opening conference took place on 1–2 September 2017, attended by Cambodian dignitaries, locals, and representatives of Baháʼí communities throughout southeast Asia.

=== Indonesia ===
The Baháʼí Faith's presence in Indonesia can be traced to the late 19th century, when two Baháʼís visited what is now Indonesia, as well as several other Southeast Asian countries. The Mentawai Islands were one of the first areas outside the Middle East and the Western world where significant numbers of conversions to the religion took place, beginning in 1957. In 2014, the Baháʼí International Community (BIC) established a regional office in Jakarta. Baháʼís have been persecuted to a moderate extent in Indonesia.

=== Laos ===
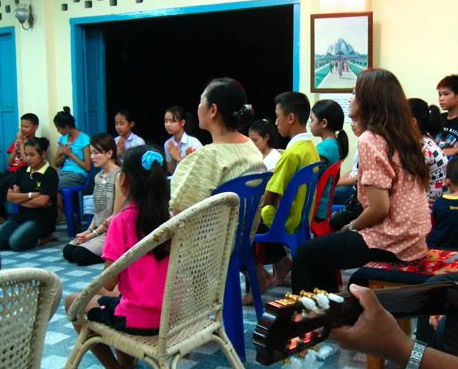
A Baháʼí gathering in Vientiane in 2009.

The history of the Baháʼí Faith in Laos began after a brief mention by ʻAbdu'l-Bahá in 1916 and the first Baháʼí entered Laos in about 1955. The first Baháʼí Local Spiritual Assembly is known to be first elected by 1958 in Vientiane and eventually Laos' own National Spiritual Assembly in 1967. The current community is approximately eight thousand adherents and four centers: Vientiane, Vientiane Province, Kaysone Phomvihane, and in Pakxe. and smaller populations in other provinces. While well established and able to function as communities in these cities Baháʼís have a harder time in other provinces and cannot print their own religious materials.

=== Malaysia ===
A large concentration of Baháʼís is also found in Malaysia, made up of Chinese, Indians, Ibans, Kadazans, Aslis and other indigenous groups. The Baháʼí community of Malaysia claims that "about 1%" of the population are Baháʼís. Given the 2017 population of Malaysia, such a claim represents about 310,000 Baháʼís.

The Baháʼí Faith is one of the recognised religions in Sarawak, the largest state in Malaysia. Various races embraced the religion, from Chinese to Iban and Bidayuh, Bisayahs, Penans, Indians but not the Malays or other Muslims. In towns, the majority Baháʼí community is often Chinese, but in rural communities, they are of all races, Ibans, Bidayuhs, etc. In some schools, Baháʼí associations or clubs for students exist. Baháʼí communities are now found in all the various divisions of Sarawak. However, these communities do not accept assistance from government or other organisations for activities which are strictly for Baháʼís. If, however, these services extend to include non-Baháʼís also, e.g. education for children's classes or adult literacy, then sometimes the community does accept assistance. The administration of the religion is through local spiritual assemblies. There is no priesthood among the Baháʼís. Election is held annually without nomination or electioneering. The Baháʼís should study the community and seek those members who display mature experience, loyalty, and are knowledgeable in the religion's beliefs.

There are more than 50,000 Baháʼís in more than 250 localities in Sarawak.

=== Philippines ===
The Baháʼí Faith in the Philippines started in 1921 with the first Baháʼí visiting the Philippines that year, and by 1944 a Baháʼí Local Spiritual Assembly was established. In the early 1960s, during a period of accelerated growth, the community grew from 200 in 1960 to 1,000 by 1962 and 2,000 by 1963. In 1964 the National Spiritual Assembly of the Baháʼís of the Philippines was elected and by 1980 there were 64,000 Baháʼís and 45 local assemblies. The Baháʼís have been active in multi/inter-faith developments. No recent numbers are available on the size of the community. In April 2025, the Universal House of Justice announced plans for a national Baháʼí House of Worship to be built in Manila, Philippines.

=== Singapore ===
The Baháʼí Faith first came to Singapore in the 1880s, when Sulaymán Khan-i-Tunukabaní (popularly known as Jamál Effendí) and Siyyid Mustafá Roumie, stopped over in Singapore for a few weeks on their way to the Javanese and Celebes islands. Jamál Effendí was the first Persian Baháʼí sent to India by Baha'u'llah to teach the Faith in 1878. His travel companion, Mustafá Roumie was a Muslim of Iraqi descent, who became enamoured with the Baháʼí teachings and became a Baháʼí during Jamal Effendi's teaching trip to India. Both of them decided to team up for the purpose of teaching the Faith to the inhabitants of the countries of Southeast Asia. In Singapore, they stayed in the Arab quarters, as guests of the Turkish Vice Consul, a well-known Arab merchant. They mixed freely with the Arab community. It is believed that they taught the Baháʼí Faith in Singapore to the Arab and Indian traders.

The teachings of the Faith did not take root in Singapore, until the arrival and residency of Dr. Khodadad Muncherji Fozdar and his wife, Mrs. Shirin Fozdar, in 1950. In a public lecture at the Singapore Rotary Club, then the most prestigious and male-dominated club in Singapore, Mrs. Shirin Fozdar mentioned Baháʼí principles such as universal brotherhood, unity of mankind, gender equality, universal language and peace, building a spiritual civilization and the establishment of world government.

Within two years of Dr. Fozdar's arrival, a total of twelve declared believers in the Baháʼí Faith emerged. Mr. Naraindas Jethanand was the first declared believer of the Faith in Singapore. The first Local Spiritual Assembly was elected in April 1952. The history of Singapore and Malaysian Baháʼí communities are closely linked, as Mrs. Fozdar gave talks in Singapore and Malaya, and other Baháʼí teachers and believers would travel between the two countries to teach the Faith. There are currently five Local Spiritual Assemblies under the jurisdiction of the Spiritual Assembly of the Baháʼís of Singapore, the national governing council, which was established in April 1972.

The mid-1990s to the early part of the 21st century saw the Bahá’í community in Singapore spearheading efforts to promote interfaith engagement in multi-religious Singapore. The World Religion Day observances, initiated and organized by the Bahá’í community in Singapore, gained nationwide prominence and support, and became the precursor for many interfaith endeavours that proliferate in Singapore now. The Bahá’í Faith became one of the constituent religions of the Inter-Religious Organisation of Singapore (IRO) in 1996. The Baháʼí community continues to participate and collaborate in interfaith events, actively promoting understanding, dialogue and interaction between different religions.

To initiate a thoughtful and self-reflective exploration into the role of religion to build an ever-advancing civilisation, the Spiritual Assembly of the Baháʼís of Singapore submitted a paper titled Rethinking the Role of Religion in the midst of our changing aspirations and increasing diversity in November 2012 as a contribution to Our Singapore Conversation.

=== Vietnam ===
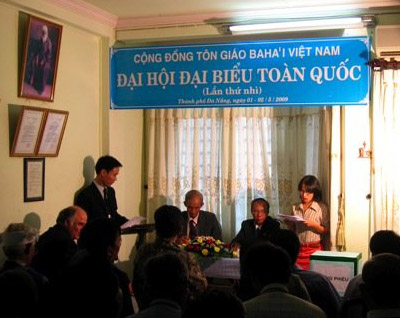
Vietnamese Baháʼís elect their National Spiritual Assembly in Danang, in 2009.

The introduction of the Baháʼí Faith in Vietnam first occurred in the 1920s, not long after French Indochina was mentioned by ʻAbdu'l-Bahá as a potential destination for Baháʼí teachers. After a number of brief visits from travelling teachers throughout the first half of the 20th century, the first Baháʼí group in Vietnam was established in Saigon in 1954, with the arrival of Shirin Fozdar, a Baháʼí teacher from India. The 1950s and 1960s were marked by periods of rapid growth, mainly in South Vietnam; despite the war then affecting the country, the Baháʼí population surged to around 200,000 adherents by 1975. After the end of the war, Vietnam was reunified under a communist government, who proscribed the practice of the religion from 1975 to 1992, leading to a sharp drop in community numbers. Relations with the government gradually improved, however, and in 2007 the Baháʼí Faith was officially registered, followed by its full legal recognition a year later. As of 2011, it was reported that the Baháʼí community comprised about 8,000 followers.

== See also ==
- Baháʼí Faith by country
- Religion in Asia
- Islam in Asia
- Hinduism in Asia
- Christianity in Asia
