= Baháʼí Faith in Finland =

The Baháʼí Faith in Finland began with contact between traveling Scandinavians with early Persian believers of the Baháʼí Faith in the mid-to-late 19th century while Finland was politically part of the Russian Empire. In the early 20th century ʻAbdu'l-Bahá, then head of the religion, requested Baháʼís from the United States and Canada consider Scandinavian countries and Russia among the places Baháʼís should pioneer to. Later, after Finland gained independence from Russia, Baháʼís began to visit the Scandinavian area in the 1920s. Following a period of more Baháʼí pioneers coming to the country, Baháʼí Local Spiritual Assemblies spread across Finland while the national community eventually formed a Baháʼí National Spiritual Assembly in 1962. Some estimates in 2004 of the Baháʼís in Finland number about 500 Baháʼís including a winner of human rights award and a television personality. In 2005 there was an estimate of over 1,700 according to the Association of Religion Data Archives (relying on World Christian Encyclopedia).

== Early history ==
The first mentions of the religion among Scandinavians happened in the era when Finland was politically united with the Russian Empire; the first mention of the Báb, who Baháʼís view as the herald to the founder of the religion, Baháʼu'lláh, was published in accounts of Persian travels by Scandinavians in 1869, and the first mentions of Baháʼu'lláh were made in 1896.

Shoghi Effendi, then head of the religion, visited Finland in 1926. Josephine Kruka, Knight of Baháʼu'lláh, entered Finland and later, in 1938, Pastor Väinö Rissanen became the first Baháʼí of Finland and the first Baháʼí Local Spiritual Assembly of Finland was formed in Helsinki in 1953. In 1955, another Knight of Baháʼu'lláh, Greta Jankko arrived in Finland after having to leave her pioneer post in the Marquesas Islands. Greta served on every Local Spiritual Assembly in Finland during the Ten Year Plan as well as for most of the Nine Year Plan. She also spent some of her time in Lapland, especially to teach the Sámi. Greta edited and retranslated sections for the second Finnish edition of Baháʼu'lláh and the New Era, and she translated the first Finnish language editions of Gleanings from the Writings of Baháʼu'lláh, Baha'i Prayers, Some Answered Questions, The Will and Testament of ʻAbdu'l-Bahá, and The Dispensation of Baháʼu'lláh. When she arrived in Finland, there were just a handful of Baháʼís, mostly elderly ladies, in the Helsinki area. When she died in 1973, there were nearly a hundred Baháʼís at her funeral.

=== Growth ===
In 1957 Finland, Denmark, and other Scandinavian countries formed a regional Baháʼí National Spiritual Assembly. In 1959, Knight of Baháʼu'lláh Brigitte Hasselblatt moved to Turku from the Shetland Islands and married Milton Lundblade. After living some years there she moved to the United States but returned again to Finland to Salo in the summer of 1984 (in the meantime their first son Laurence Lundblade would later be one of the initial authors of the e-mail client Pine). For 1957 through 1962 Finland Baháʼí institutions were part of the regional National Spiritual Assembly of Scandinavia and Finland. In 1960, Hand of the Cause Adelbert Muhlschlegel visited in Finland. In 1962 Sweden, Finland, and Norway each elected their own National Spiritual Assembly. The members of the National Assembly who participated in the election of the Universal House of Justice in 1963 were Godratollah Bidardel, Greta Sofia Jankko-Badeau, Aminda Josephine Kruka, Mozaffar Namdar, Gudrun Ofstegaard, Maija-Liisa Ravola, Sirkka Inkeri Salmi, Mailis Kaarina Talvenheimo and Habibu'llah Zabihian. By the end of 1963 there were local spiritual assemblies in Helsinki, Lahti, Tampere, Turku, and groups of Baháʼís in Kaaresuvanto and isolated Baháʼís in Hämeenlinna, Kilo, Koski Tl, Rovaniemi, and Vartsalo. In 2019 there were 14 Local Spiritual Assemblies, and Baháʼís living in 87 localities.

== Development ==
Following this period of largely internal development, the Baháʼí Faith in Finland began to be involved in regional developments. In the 1970s and 80s Finland Baháʼís helped translate Baháʼí literature into Estonian, Lithuanian and Latvian. Finland was among the national communities that responded to a survey on status of women in the community which was tabulated and summarized for the 1974 Statement to the 25th session of the UN Commission on the Status of Women. In the mid-1960s in Alaska Angeline Giachery conceived of a plan to spread the religion across the circumpolar area and the idea received attention at the Intercontinental Conference in Helsinki in 1976 which was also attended by Hand of the Cause Ugo Giachery. Roma Raciulyte became a Baháʼí during a trip to Finland in the 1970s and is generally considered the first Lithuanian Baháʼí in recent times.

== Diverse involvements of the modern community ==
Since its inception the religion has had involvement in socio-economic development beginning by giving greater freedom to women, promulgating the promotion of female education as a priority concern, and that involvement was given practical expression by creating schools, agricultural coops, and clinics. The religion entered a new phase of activity when a message of the Universal House of Justice dated 20 October 1983 was released. Baháʼís were urged to seek out ways, compatible with the Baháʼí teachings, in which they could become involved in the social and economic development of the communities in which they lived. Worldwide in 1979 there were 129 officially recognized Baháʼí socio-economic development projects. By 1987, the number of officially recognized development projects had increased to 1482. Since the 1980s the Baháʼís of Finland have greatly diversified their endeavours. In the late 1980s a group of Baháʼí musicians based in Naantali composed an album, Pohjantähti (North Star) simultaneously in Finnish and English out of a quest to be culturally creative instead of merely translating foreign interpretations of the religion into song. In 1990 Alaskan Baháʼís visited Finland as part of a circumpolar campaign to spread the religion especially among indigenous peoples.

In January 1998 Dr. Sylvia I. Karlsson lead the Finnish Baháʼí community national convention on a full day seminar on ethical dimensions of Agenda 21 and sustainable development by giving the keynote talk as well as preparing parallel workshops on various chapters of Agenda 21 and summarizing the discussions. The position of the Baháʼí Faith in Finland reached national acknowledgment when in 1999 the educational authorities in Finland included courses mentioning the Baháʼí Faith in the curricula of primary and secondary schools. This relationship between national and civic events continued when in 2002 the Baháʼí community of Lappeenranta registered their regularly held public meeting for World Religion Day. This discussion was on the subject of world peace with participants of local Christian, civic and Muslim groups building on a decade of efforts. In 2003, Iranian Baháʼí émigré Melody Karvonen was awarded the 2003 Human Rights Worker of the Year by the Finnish League for Human Rights. The same year the government of Finland co-sponsored a resolution of the United Nations which was passed by a vote of 73 to 49, with 50 abstentions, by the Third Committee of the United Nations General Assembly expressing "serious concern" over continuing violations of human rights in Iran—and mentions specifically "continuing discrimination" against Baháʼís and other religious minorities. (see Persecution of Baháʼís.)

Most recently, in 2003, the play The Seven Valleys was premiered at the Naantali Theatre and reviewed by Pentti Narvanen of the newspaper Rannikkoseudun sanomat. Based on the work of the same name by Baháʼu'lláh, the play has since been shown at other venues including in Lappeenranta. Aram Aflatuni was a Baháʼí TV talk show host of Härkää Sarvista, or "Grab the Bull by the Horns", which aired in Finland in 2007 viewed by 20 percent of the TV audience with a format that emphasized using a panel of experts and cooperative discussions to try to solve the participants' problems. Aram has since established a Baháʼí-inspired organization named Gutsy Go which won the first-ever 'Builders of the Century' award in Finland. Gutsy Go aims to give young people living in neighborhoods with bad reputations the tools they need to improve their communities. The firm received a cash prize of 1.5 million euros to develop its operations.

Hartmut Grossmann was born in Germany, was a lecturer and head of the German Department of the Translators' Training Institute at University of Joensuu in Savonlinna. He has served on the National Spiritual Assemblies of the Baháʼís of Germany and of Finland, on the International Teaching Centre and then ultimately on the Universal House of Justice. After retiring in 2008, he and his wife, Ursula, moved back to Finland, subsequently returning to Germany where Ursula died in 2017 and Hartmut in 2018.

=== Demographics ===
According to the membership register maintained by the National Spiritual Assembly of Finland, there were 760 Baháʼí living in Finland in 2019. The National Assembly is also administratively responsible for 68 Baháʼís residing in the North Calotte region of Sweden and Norway. While no official statistics on the numbers of Baha'is have been released, the Finland Census reports about 0.9 - 1.2% of the population as religious but non-Christian. The Evangelical Lutheran Church of Finland estimated the 2004 population of Baháʼís to be approximately 500. Operation World, another Christian organization, estimated 0.01%, also about 500 Baháʼís, in 2003.

== See also ==
- Religion in Finland
- History of Finland
- Baháʼí Faith in Denmark
- Baháʼí Faith in Norway
- Baháʼí Faith in Sweden
