= International Community School Amman =

Location
- Na'our; Amman, Amman Governorate; Jordan; 31.8587°N 35.8603°E

Information
- Type: Private
- Established: 1953
- School district: Um al Basateen, Nauór
- Principal: Alun Yorath
- Staff: 300
- Faculty: 120
- Grades: K-12
- Enrollment: 2000
- Houses: Aqaba, Jerash, Petra, Wadi Rum
- Information: global home of #themonalisaeffect
- Website: http://www.ics.edu.jo/

The International Community School (ICS) is an international co-educational school in Amman, Jordan. Over 700 students between the ages of three and 18 from more than 50 countries currently attend. (ICS) is independent, private and non-profit, following the English National Curriculum (ENC). The school is accredited by the Council of British International Schools (COBIS) . (ICS) is also a member of CIS and ECIS. The current principal is Alun Yorath.

== History ==
In 1953 ICS was established in a building at Marka airport as a primary school for the children of members of the British Military based in Amman. It was later relocated to Wasfi Al Tal Street, Khalda to serve the growing expatriate community in Jordan's capital. The primary school expanded with the addition of the secondary school in 1999. In September 2009, ICS moved to purpose-built premises in the outskirts of Amman, Um Al Basatin, Naur Area.

== Curriculum ==
ICS enrolls children aged between three and 18. The curriculum is taught in line with the National Curriculum for England and Wales leading to IGCSEs and GCSEs in Year 10 and 11 to AS- and A-levels in Year 13. BTEC levels 2 and 3 are also offered. External exams provided by UK examination boards are given at the end of the school year.

ICS states that it supports individual learning needs, from top students to those who have "mild-to-moderate" learning disabilities.

A choice of foreign language instruction in English, Arabic or French is introduced as part of the curriculum from year one onward.

ICS follows the ENC's traditional English-style school year (September to July), consisting of two terms and half-terms. Holidays throughout the school year include those recognized in the Jordanian Islamic calendar as public holidays, the Eastern Orthodox Easter, and a winter break traditionally recognized by schools in the Western Calendar.

== Facilities ==
The ICS facilities support arts education in subjects including music and drama, as well as science and information and communication technology (ICT). ICS also offers facilities for toddlers at nursery and "reception level".

== Faculty ==
The teaching staff maintains a balance between local and overseas appointments with the majority being British-trained and educationally certified in Britain.
