= Baháʼí Faith in Japan =

The Baháʼí Faith in Japan begins after a few mentions of the country by ʻAbdu'l-Bahá first in 1875. Japanese contact with the religion came from the West when Kanichi Yamamoto (山本寛一) was living in Honolulu, Hawaii in 1902 converted; the second being Saichiro Fujita (藤田左弌郎).

In 1914 two Baháʼís, George Jacob Augur and Agnes Alexander, and their families, pioneered to Japan. Alexander would live some 31 years off and on in Japan until 1967 when she left for the last time. The first Baháʼí convert on Japanese soil was Kikutaro Fukuta (福田菊太郎) in 1915. ʻAbdu'l-Bahá undertook several trips in 1911-1912 and met Japanese travelers in Western cities, in Paris, London, and New York. ʻAbdu'l-Bahá met Fujita in Chicago and Yamamoto in San Francisco.

ʻAbdu'l-Bahá wrote a series of letters, or tablets, in 1916-1917 compiled together in the book titled Tablets of the Divine Plan but which was not presented in the United States until 1919. Fujita would serve between the World Wars first in the household of ʻAbdu'l-Bahá and then of Shoghi Effendi. In 1932 the first Baháʼí Local Spiritual Assembly was elected in Tokyo and reelected in 1933. In all of Japan there were 19 Baháʼís.

In 1937 Alexander went on Baháʼí pilgrimage to return years later. In 1938 Fujita was excused from his services in Haifa out of fears for his safety during World War II and returned to Japan until 1956. In 1942, back in the United States, the Yamamoto family lived at a relocation camp during the war. Baháʼí Americans associated with the American Occupation Forces reconnected the Japanese Baháʼí community — Michael Jamir found Fujita by 1946 and Robert Imagire helped re-elect the assembly in Tokyo in 1948. In 1963 the statistics of Baháʼí communities showed 13 assemblies and other smaller groups.

In 1968 Japanese Baháʼís began to travel outside Japan. In 1971 the first residents of Okinawa converted to the religion. In 1991 the community organized an affiliate of the Association for Baháʼí Studies in Japan which has since held annual conferences, published newsletters, and published and coordinated academic work across affiliates. The Association of Religion Data Archives (relying on World Christian Encyclopedia) estimated some 15650 Baháʼís in 2005 while the CIA World Factbook estimated about 12000 Japanese Baháʼís in 2006.

== Early period ==
The first mention of Japan in Baháʼí literature is with the Secret of Divine Civilization written by ʻAbdu'l-Bahá in 1875. It was written to try to enlighten Persia. It says:

…the government of Japan was in the beginning subject to and under the protection of China, and that now for some years, Japan has opened its eyes and adopted the techniques of contemporary progress and civilization, promoting sciences and industries of use to the public, and striving to the utmost of their power and competence until public opinion was focused on reform. This government has currently advanced to such a point that, although its population is only one-sixth, or even one-tenth, that of China, it has recently challenged the latter government, and China has finally been forced to come to terms. Observe carefully how education and the arts of civilization bring honor, prosperity, independence and freedom to a government and its people.

=== Firsts ===
Baháʼís moved across Asia from the turn of the century. Baháʼís were in Shanghai in 1902, Philippines by 1944, Taiwan and Canton in 1923, and Macau in 1953. However, for the Japanese contact with the religion came from the West. Kanichi Yamamoto was living in Honolulu, Hawaii in 1902 where a Baháʼí, Elizabeth Muther, introduced him to the religion. Yamamoto wrote a letter to ʻAbdu'l-Bahá and enters the history books as the first Japanese Baháʼí — the second and third being Saichiro Fujita and Kenzo Torikai. The first Baháʼís to visit Japan were Mason Remey and Howard C. Struve on December 27, 1909 who addressed an audience at a Tokyo YMCA. D. T. Suzuki's wife, Beatrice, had multiple contacts with the Baháʼís both in America and in Japan and was for a time considered a Baháʼí. Bernard Leach lived in Japan from 1909-1920 working on the Mingei arts and converted to the religion in 1940. Leach received awards for his continued work in Japanese folk arts in the 1960s and 70s. A few other Baháʼís traveled through Japan in 1911 and 1914. But in 1914 two Baháʼís, George Jacob Augur and Agnes Alexander, and their families, pioneered to Japan. Alexander would live some 31 years off and on in Japan until 1967 when she left for the last time and much of her work would be through Esperantists and connections with the blind community of Japan. Meetings for the public were set up and talks and interviews were given including to Esperantist audiences. The first Baháʼí convert on Japanese soil was Kikutaro Fukuta in 1915, followed by the blind Russian youth Vasily Eroshenko who later drifted to communism. Also in 1915, Martha Root arrived for the first time in Japan and Tokujiro Torii converted to the religion. Torrii later served as president of the Japanese Blind Association and received an Imperial Citation, the Medal of the Third Order, for his work on behalf of the blind. Cities where Baháʼís traveled in this early phase include Kobe, Kyoto, Tokyo, Hiroshima and this period also saw the first observances of the Baháʼí Holy Days of Naw Ruz and the Declaration of the Báb. In the spring of 1916 Fukuta and Eroshenko made the first contributions towards raising the first Baháʼí House of Worship being raised in Wilmette, Illinois, USA. In the summer of 1916 Eroshenko took a copy of Some Answered Questions with him when he traveled to Siam and Burma. The first Japanese woman to convert to the religion was Yuri Mochizuki in 1919. Shortly before the death of ʻAbdu'l-Bahá in 1921, Alexander and Oh Sang Sun made a trip from Japan to Korea, then under Japanese rule, for the first entry of the religion in that country. Alexander also spent time with Shibusawa Eiichi. Elsewhere Fujita served as a secretary to Bahíyyih Khánum in communicating the death of ʻAbdu'l-Bahá in late 1921. At a time when women speaking in public was rare, two women, a Miss Mochizuki and Haruko Mori, spoke at the memorial service of the death of ʻAbdu'l-Bahá held in Japan.

=== ʻAbdu'l-Bahá meets ===
The Japanese Ambassador to Spain was staying in Paris when ʻAbdu'l-Bahá stayed there on his 1911 trip to the west and they met and had a prolonged conversation. In London in 1912, ʻAbdu'l-Bahá came in contact with the President of the Japan Women's University. It was this occasion that ʻAbdu'l-Bahá wrote the only prayer he wrote for the Japanese. It says:

O God! The darkness of contention, strife and warfare between the religious, the nations and the people has beclouded the horizon of Reality and hidden the heaven of Truth! The world is in need of the light of Guidance! Therefore, O God! Confer Thy favor so that the Sun of Reality may illumine the East and the West.

In New York he met several Japanese as well. On September 12, ʻAbdu'l-Bahá reached Chicago. Fujita attempted to connect with ʻAbdu'l-Bahá at Cleveland but caught up with him in Chicago. Fujita would accompany ʻAbdu'l-Bahá across many American cities including Kenosha, Wisconsin, St. Paul and Minneapolis, Minnesota, Denver and Glenwood Springs, Colorado, Salt Lake City, Utah, and San Francisco and Stanford, California - Fujita would serve between the World Wars first in the household of ʻAbdu'l-Bahá and then of Shoghi Effendi. On October 22, ʻAbdu'l-Bahá reached San Francisco where he met Yamamoto who arranged for a presentation among a Japanese audience in Oakland.

=== ʻAbdu'l-Bahá writes to Japan and Korea ===
In all ʻAbdu'l-Bahá wrote 18 tablets to Japanese living in Japan, and the last one was to the Koreans dated November 5, 1921. Eighteen of the nineteen Tablets were addressed to young people, and seven of these to girls of Tokyo. It is remarkable that the only Tablets to women in Asia were to three Japanese girls: Yuri Mochizuki who received three Tablets, Haruko Mori and Mikae Komatsu, each received one, and the group of girls who were sent two Tablets. ʻAbdu'l-Bahá made mentioned especially to the blind of Japan. He addressed five Tablets to three blind men.

=== ʻAbdu'l-Bahá's Tablets of the Divine Plan ===
ʻAbdu'l-Bahá wrote a series of letters, or tablets, to the followers of the religion in the United States in 1916-1917 suggesting Baháʼís take the religion to many places; these letters were compiled together in the book titled Tablets of the Divine Plan but were delayed in being presented in the United States until 1919 — after the end of World War I and the Spanish flu. These tablets were translated and presented by Mirza Ahmad Sohrab on April 4, 1919, and published in Star of the West magazine on December 12, 1919. One tablet says in part:

O that I could travel, even though on foot and in the utmost poverty, to these regions, and, raising the call of Yá Baháʼu'l-Abhá in cities, villages, mountains, deserts and oceans, promote the divine teachings! This, alas, I cannot do. How intensely I deplore it! Please God, ye may achieve it.… …if some teachers go to other islands and other parts, such as the continent of Australia, New Zealand, Tasmania, also to Japan, Asiatic Russia, Korea, French Indochina, Siam, Straits Settlements, India, Ceylon and Afghanistan, most great results will be forthcoming.

== Growth to WWII ==
The Baháʼís in Japan were witness to, and participated in the relief effort of, the 1923 Great Kantō earthquake. Moneys and letters of concern arrived from Baháʼís in New York, Haifa, Kenosha, Wi., Brooklyn, Chicago, Somerville, Mass., Montreal, Canada among other places spreading encouragement and reporting on or actually sending funds Baháʼís and others had marshaled for the relief effort. In 1927 Siegfried Schopflocher visited Japan and reported the religion was firmly established and progressing. In 1932 the first Baháʼí Local Spiritual Assembly was elected in Tokyo. There was a preliminary election that corrected when Shoghi Effendi, then head of the religion, specified rules that needed to be followed for the election. The members of the community of Tokyo were (former Rev.) Sempo Ito; Yuri Mochizuki Furukawa; Otoe Murakami; Kanae Takeshita; Mr. Y. Kataoka (first name unknown); Keiji Sawada; Agnes Alexander; Antoinette Naganuma; Mr. Nakanishi (first name unknown); Hidehiko Matsuda; and Keiko Eito. The first nine names were elected to the provisional Local Spiritual Assembly but the later official election changed adding Mr. Matsuda, who took the place of Mr. Y. Kataoka, who asked to be relieved. The members included five women and two who were blind. The assembly was reelected in 1933. In all of Japan there were 19 Baháʼís. In 1916 Daiun Inouye was a young Buddhist priest when he first heard of the religion. In 1932 he translated Baháʼu'lláh and the New Era and it was printed the following year. In 1937 he resigned from the priesthood and wrote that he would be free to spend his time propagating the Baháʼí Faith.

Starting in the 1920s, Alexander began various trips and coming contact with public figures in Japan and some publications reached a broader audience. In 1923 Alexander first visited Hong Kong and returned on several more over the next thirty years. Alexander also accompanied Root on one of her return trips to the area - this time on a trip to China and Alexander made contacts among the Chinese, especially from Canton and Shanghai, who visited Japan as well. In 1928 seven specially bound volumes of Baháʼí books were presented for the coronation of the emperor Hirohito and were part of his library and at the Enthronement Ceremonies of His Majesty the Emperor of Japan three foreigners were invited to speak, including Alexander as a Baháʼí representative. In 1932 Esperantist Tadashi Watanabe invited Alexander to talk about the Baháʼí Faith and Esperanto first in Tomakomai, and then the then-village of Yamabe, Hokkaido.

== Crisis of WWII ==
In 1937 Alexander went on Baháʼí pilgrimage and, aware of the impossibility of returning to Japan during the Second World War, traveled to other countries. In 1938 Fujita was excused from his services in Haifa out of fears for his safety during the war and returned to Japan until circa 1956. In 1942 back in the United States the Yamamoto family lived at a relocation camp during the war. Two children — one from Nagasaki and one from Hiroshima — later converted to the religion and have shared their story.

Baháʼí Americans associated with the American Occupation Forces reconnected the Japanese Baháʼí community: They were Michael Jamir, Lorraine Wright, and Robert Imagire. Jamir in particular undertook trips to find Torii and Fujita circa 1945–6. Imagire arrived in 1947 and was given an address where Alexander had left her printed materials. He found the only building still standing after the bombing held 200 copies of Baháʼu'lláh and the New Era in Japanese. In 1948 Imagire helped re-elect the assembly in Tokyo. While all the Japanese members were new Baháʼís and eventually drifted into inactivity, the assembly was continually re-elected and remains today.

Alexander was able to return to Japan in 1950 after being sponsored by Lt. J.C. Davenport (USAF) and in 1951 four American pioneers were elected to the Tokyo Local Spiritual Assembly. The Japanese membership then was Miss Ichige, Mr. Kadota, Mr. Horioka, Miss Nakanishi, and Mr. Yoshino. The Americans were Alexander, Lane Skelton, Barbara Davenport, and Imagire. The assembly designated goal areas to take the religion — Yokohama, Sendai, Osaka, Hiroshima, and Kofu — and established eight committees with attention ranging from re-translating Baháʼu'lláh and the New Era to coordinating membership record keeping and the arrival of Persian pioneers. The Moghbel and Katirai Persian families arrived in 1953. In 1954 the community was 52 adults — 10 were Americans and 13 were Persians. Barbara Sims, one of the American pioneers, was elected to the Local Spiritual Assembly of Tokyo in 1954 and served for many years on that body and authored several books on the history of the Baháʼí Faith in Japan.

The first center owned by the Baháʼí assemblies in Japan was in Amagasaki in 1953. The Tokyo assembly bought a house; it became the second Baháʼí Center in 1954. The third one was in Osaka. In 1956 there were eight assemblies in Japan and the community had marshaled resources to publish a Japanese language Baháʼí Geppo (monthly newspaper) which was also read in Korea. In 1957 Sims was elected to the first regional National Spiritual Assembly of North East Asia, and Alexander was appointed as one of the Hands of the Cause, a position which she held the rest of her lifetime.

== Post-War growth ==
In 1963 the statistics of Baháʼí communities showed 13 assemblies, 9 groups of Baháʼís, and 31 isolated Baháʼís.

Assemblies: 13
Akashi	Ashiya	Hiroshima	Kobe	Kyoto
Nagasaki	Nishinomiya	Osaka	Sapporo	
Shiraoi	Takarazuka	Tokyo	Yokohama	
Groups: 9
Amagasaki	Fukiage (now merged)	Fukuoka	Itami	Musashi
Nagoya	Takamatsu	Takasago	Tonosho	

Toshio Suzuki became a Baháʼí near 1963 and would later serve on the National Spiritual Assembly of Japan and his brother, Hideya Suzuki, serve as the first Japanese Continental Counselor. In 1965 Alexander fell and broke her hip. She convalesced in Japan for two years and returned to Hawaii where she died in 1971. The first Baháʼí Cemetery — a division of a larger cemetery — was established in 1958. The first burial there was in 1964 and represented a departure from socio-Buddhist norm of cremation. In 1968 Masaaki Ushibata traveled outside Japan for Baháʼí purposes and in 1975 became the first Japanese pioneer — to the Eastern Caroline Islands. In 1969 the Japanese Baháʼís arrange for the first National Youth Conference in Jogashima. In 1971 the first residents of Okinawa converted to the religion. There were some marriages between Japanese Baháʼís and other nationalities which sometimes faced racism in Japanese society.

American pioneers continued to play a role in Japan into the 1990s. In 1974 Sims was elected to the first National Spiritual Assembly of Japan, serving until 1993. Sims also had contact with Ainu Baháʼís including notably chief Takeichi Moritake (1902–1976) and son Kazutomo Umegae (1924–1992).

== Modern community ==
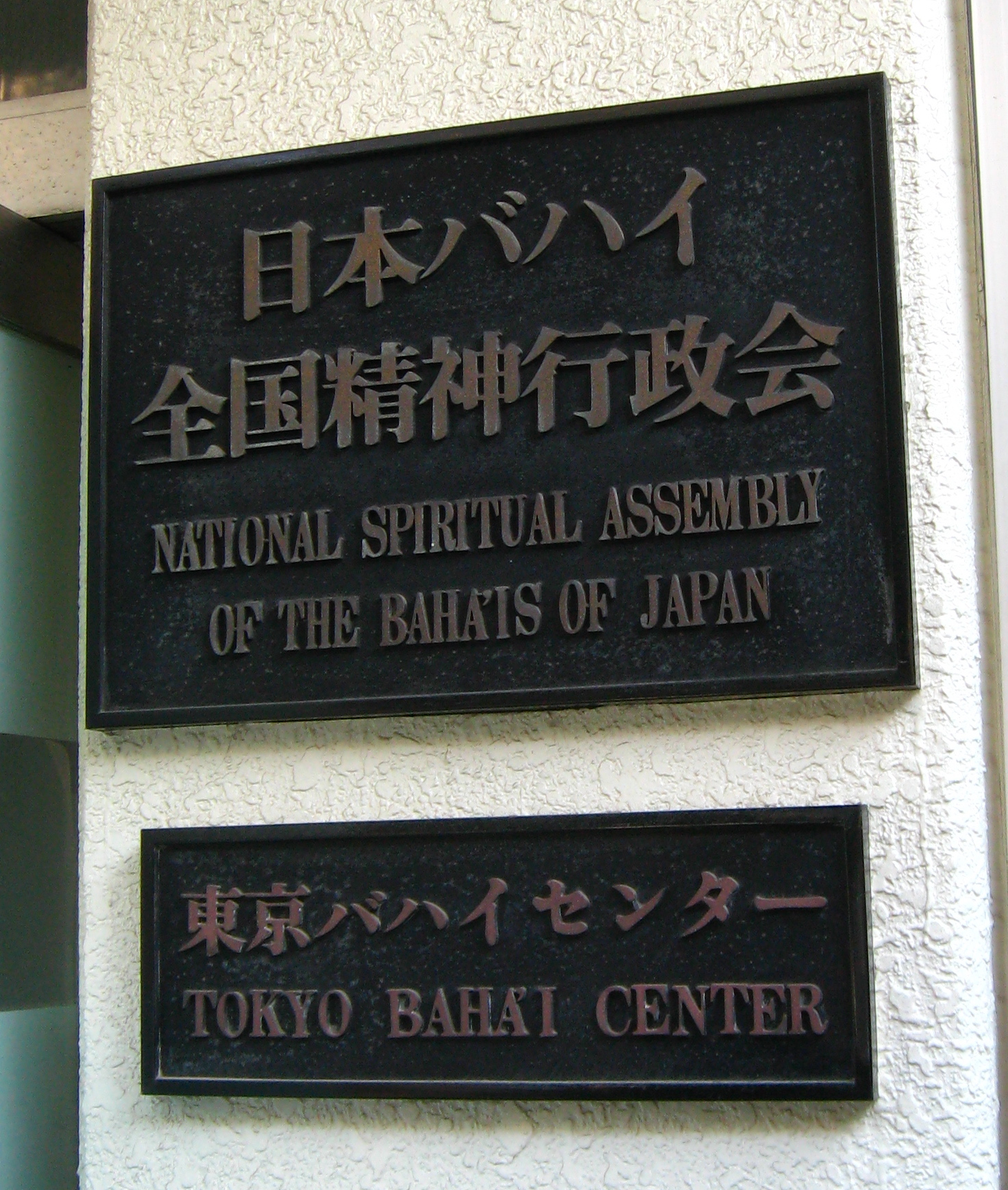
Sign outside the Tokyo Baha'i Center, Shinjuku Ward.

Since its inception, the religion has had involvement in socio-economic development beginning by giving greater freedom to women, promulgating the promotion of female education as a priority concern, and that involvement was given practical expression by creating schools, agricultural coops, and clinics. The religion entered a new phase of activity when a message of the Universal House of Justice dated 20 October 1983 was released. Baháʼís were urged to seek out ways, compatible with the Baháʼí teachings, in which they could become involved in the social and economic development of the communities in which they lived. The highest concentration of members can be found in Tokyo, where the "Baha'i gatherings are often multi-ethnic and internationally minded, with primary activities consisting of study groups on the faith and discussions of local and global issues."

Worldwide in 1979 there were 129 officially recognized Baháʼí socio-economic development projects. By 1987, the number of officially recognized development projects had increased to 1482. The modern Baháʼí community of Japan has grown and developed strength in diverse interests. The Japanese census does not have questions regarding religion however the Association of Religion Data Archives (relying on World Christian Encyclopedia) estimated some 15,700 Baháʼís in 2005 while the CIA World Factbook estimated about 12,000 members in 2006. In 2005 there were 31 delegates to the National Convention to elect the National Spiritual Assembly of Japan.

In 2000 Japan rose in support of a United Nations human rights resolution about concern over the Baháʼís in Iran as well as taking steps to further document conditions.

=== Academics ===
In 1991 the community organized an affiliate of the Association for Baháʼí Studies in Japan which has since held annual conferences, published newsletters, and published and coordinated academic work across affiliates. In the 1999 Yerrinbool Report on Scholarship various Japanese academics are noted: Landegg Academy had a faculty member, Seinan Gakiun, from the University in Japan, Nozomu Sonda published a revision to an introductory book in Japanese, Mary Noguchi who chaired the 8th conference, Tsunoi Hiroshi who chaired the 2008 conference, Sandra Sims Fotos chaired several of the conferences, physicist Stephen R. Friberg, several of whom also worked on the University Club Committee. The conferences have been held in places like Waseda University, Sapporo, Tokyo, Yokohama, Yamaguchi, and Kyoto. Several Baháʼís work with the University of Maryland University College in Asia (UMUC-Asia). Ruth Lattimore is the mathematics academic director living in Yokota base in Tokyo. Irene Chung is assistant to UMUC-Asia's area director for Korea and was a Continental Counselor for Korea, Japan, and Thailand. Richard Dowling is an associate professor for UMUC–Asia teaching modern American and European history living in mostly in South Korea, but with some time in Guam, Japan, and Australia. Nicholas Mayer currently serves as the Whole School Librarian at Nagoya International School in Japan.

=== Arts ===
There are a number of Baháʼí artists who have done work who lived in Japan.

- John Kavelin (deceased 2009) has done set design and contributed elements of sets including San Francisco Bahá´í Peace conference, 1986, the main stage of the 1992 Baháʼí World Congress at both the Javits Convention Center as well as several of the satellite hotel venues.
- Janet Sono has acted, directed and been a playwright for a number of plays she's done in Japan.
- Kathleen Hite Babb has written articles and books. The Persian is a historical fiction novel about the intellect vs. the heart in terms of empirical thought vs. faith and spiritual experience.
- Barbara Casterline is a Nihonga and Sumi-e painter.
- Yuichi Hirano has done a design of the yet-to-be-built Japanese Baháʼí House of Worship.

=== Diverse involvements ===
Ambassador Ryozo Kato spoke on 4 September 2005 after a week-long celebration of the role played 100 years ago by a prominent US Baháʼí, Sarah Farmer, who held a conference in 1904 that closed with a program dedicated to the resolution of the Russo-Japanese War by the 1905 Treaty of Portsmouth.

Representatives of Japanese Baha'i Community visited the Risshō Kōsei Kai headquarters in Tokyo where the President Nichiko Niwano and the representatives spoke of the importance of interreligious cooperation. The Filipino Baháʼís hosted a regional conference in 2008 including over 300 Baháʼís from Japan, Hong Kong, Taiwan, Macau, Caroline Islands, Mariana Islands, and Marshall Islands attending.

== See also ==
- Baháʼí Faith by country
- History of Japan
- Religion in Japan
