= Baháʼí Faith in Sweden =

The Baháʼí Faith in Sweden began after coverage in the 19th century followed by several Swede-Americans who had met ʻAbdu'l-Bahá in the United States around 1912 and pioneered or visited the country starting in 1920. By 1932 translations of Baháʼí literature had been accomplished and around 1947 the first Baháʼí Local Spiritual Assembly had been elected in Stockholm. In 1962 the first National Spiritual Assembly of Sweden was elected. The Baháʼís claim about 1,000 members and 25 local assemblies in Sweden.

== Early history ==
The first mentions of the religion happened when the book En resa i Persien, published 1869, which mentions the Báb, who Baháʼís view as the herald to the founder of the religion. Baháʼu'lláh is first mentioned in a published account of Persian travels in 1869 in the magazine Kringsjå No. 2 from July 31, 1896.

Ragna Linné was a nineteenth and twentieth century classical soprano born in Oslo during the period of Union between Sweden and Norway and of Swedish/Norwegian roots who encountered the Baháʼí Faith after she moved to Chicago. She traveled back to Norway at least in 1908. She was visible as a Baháʼí circa 1908 in newspapers and to 1916 in the magazine Star of the West by Baháʼís. She was at the 1912 convention, attended by ʻAbdu'l-Bahá, then head of the religion.

In 1912 Louise M. Erickson attended the dedication of the first Baháʼí House of Worship in the West - in Chicago, United States. The first comprehensive article covering the religion was in the July 2, 1913 issue of Aftonbladet. It covers the history of the period of the Báb, through Baháʼu'lláh imprisonment and banishments, and ʻAbdu'l-Bahá's freedom and visit to Paris.

=== ʻAbdu'l-Bahá's Tablets of the Divine Plan ===
ʻAbdu'l-Bahá, then head of the religion, wrote a series of letters, or tablets, to the followers of the religion in the United States in 1916-1917; these letters were compiled together in the book titled Tablets of the Divine Plan. The seventh of the tablets was the first to mention several countries in Europe including beyond where ʻAbdu'l-Bahá had visited in 1911–12. Written on April 11, 1916, it was delayed in being presented in the United States until 1919 — after the end of World War I and the Spanish flu. The seventh tablet was translated and presented by Mirza Ahmad Sohrab on April 4, 1919, and published in Star of the West magazine on December 12, 1919.

"In brief, this world-consuming war has set such a conflagration to the hearts that no word can describe it. In all the countries of the world the longing for universal peace is taking possession of the consciousness of men. There is not a soul who does not yearn for concord and peace. A most wonderful state of receptivity is being realized.… Therefore, O ye believers of God! Show ye an effort and after this war spread ye the synopsis of the divine teachings in the British Isles, France, Germany, Austria-Hungary, Russia, Italy, Spain, Belgium, Switzerland, Norway, Sweden, Denmark, Holland, Portugal, Rumania, Serbia, Montenegro, Bulgaria, Greece, Andorra, Liechtenstein, Luxembourg, Monaco, San Marino, Balearic Isles, Corsica, Sardinia, Sicily, Crete, Malta, Iceland, Faroe Islands, Shetland Islands, Hebrides and Orkney Islands."

=== Pioneers ===
Following the release of these tablets a few Baháʼís began moving to or at least visiting countries across Europe. August Rudd, born in Värmland on 7 August 1871, became the first Swedish Baháʼí pioneer in July 1920, with permission of ʻAbdu'l-Baha, on returning from Kenosha and Chicago, United States where he and his brothers had sold their inventions. Rudd settled in Boda and worked in a local school. He was followed a year or two later by Edvard Olsson. In 1923, Louise Eriksson visited August Rudd and teacher Anna Elisabeth Gustavsson, perhaps the first convert in Sweden circa 1920–22, and brought them a copy of Baháʼu'lláh and the New Era by John Esslemont. August and Ann married though August died on February 13, 1926. Nya Wermlands-Tidningen published a letter in the May 2, 1924 issue by Anna Rudd. Helsingborgs Dagblad covered Martha Root's visit to Sweden where she participated in an Esperanto congress in Stockholm. Root made a return trip also covered by Dagblad printed on July 31, 1934. Youness Khan Afrukhtih, formerly one of ʻAbdu'l-Bahá secretaries, arrived in Oslo in September 1929. He had several interviews, including on the BBC, 2.September 1929 and a Weekly Review, 5. September 1929. In 1929 Anna Rudd left Östervallskog and moved to Malmköping and then to Göteborg, where she married Baháʼí Bernard Arvid Palmgren. In October 1932 they moved to Ramen in Värmland and finished translating and publishing Baháʼu'lláh and the New Era followed by the Kitáb-i-Íqán in 1936. In 1935 Louise Eriksson, on another visit in Sweden, had the opportunity to meet former Chief Magistrate Carl Lindhagen and on March 19, 1935, she received an audience with then Crown Prince Gustaf-Adolf - reported by the Aftonbladet on March 21, 1935, Anna Rudd Palmgren died 27 August 1943. Following World War II, Shoghi Effendi, then head of the religion, oversaw the creation of the European Teaching committee which supervised pioneers to Europe. From their work, Amelia Bowman arrived in Stockholm in October 1947, and with the assistance of Dorothy Baker was able to bring about the election of the first Baháʼí Local Spiritual Assembly in Stockholm in 1947–8. Bowman then traveled to Gothenburg where she was again able to bring the community together and elect its first assembly in 1948-9 - (it lapsed but was re-elected in 1952.) Bowman then moved to Oslo Norway in 1949 and spent the next 33 years pioneering in various countries of Europe.

== Development ==
The third inter-continental teachings conference was held in Stockholm 21–26 July 1953 at which a number of talks were given for the general public as well as the Baháʼís including a long letter from Shoghi Effendi which outlined various goals for the community across Europe. As the religion spread across Scandinavia it reached the point where a regional National Spiritual Assembly for Norway, Finland, Sweden and Denmark was established in 1957. A separate National Spiritual Assembly of Sweden was first elected in 1962. By the end of 1963 there were Local Spiritual Assemblies in Gothenburg, Malmö, Stockholm, and Uppsala. Smaller groups of Baháʼís were in Alafors, Brastad, Sundbyberg - and an additional 16 isolated individuals spread through the country.

== Modern community ==
Since its inception the religion has had involvement in socio-economic development beginning by giving greater freedom to women, promulgating the promotion of female education as a priority concern, and that involvement was given practical expression by creating schools, agricultural coops, and clinics. The religion entered a new phase of activity when a message of the Universal House of Justice dated 20 October 1983 was released. Baháʼís were urged to seek out ways, compatible with the Baháʼí teachings, in which they could become involved in the social and economic development of the communities in which they lived. Worldwide in 1979 there were 129 officially recognized Baháʼí socio-economic development projects. By 1987, the number of officially recognized development projects had increased to 1482. The Swedish community of Baháʼís have undertaken a number of projects both internally and for the good of others whether collectively or individually. Zaid Lundberg, a student in History of Religions at Lund University wrote a MA thesis, entitled Baháʼí Apocalypticism: The Baháʼí Concept of Progressive Revelation and went on to write a number of papers and teach. In 2004 the community began to support the Barli Development Institute for Rural Women. The Swedish Baháʼí community hosted the Nordic Baha'i Youth Conference in 2005 and 2009. A number of small projects are being carried on in Stockholm, Göteborg, Sigtuna, and Uppsala.

=== Demographics ===
The Baháʼís claim about 1,000 Baháʼís and 25 local assemblies in Sweden from Umeå in the north to Malmö in the south. In November 2009 the Swedish paper Västerbottens-Kuriren reported that 25 local non-profit Baháʼí organization had changed their organizational form to religious communions. The central Baháʼí secretariat in Stockholm stated at the time that the Baha'i Faith in Sweden had 1003 members. The Association of Religion Data Archives (relying on World Christian Encyclopedia) estimated some 6,200 Baháʼís in 2005.

== See also ==
- Religion in Sweden
- History of Sweden
- Baháʼí Faith in Denmark
- Baháʼí Faith in Norway
- Baháʼí Faith in Finland
