= Baháʼí Faith in Norway =

The Baháʼí Faith in Norway began with contact between traveling Scandinavians with early Persian believers of the Baháʼí Faith in the mid-to-late 19th century. Baháʼís first visited Scandinavia in the 1920s following ʻAbdu'l-Bahá's, then head of the religion, request outlining Norway among the countries Baháʼís should pioneer to and the first Baháʼí to settle in Norway was Johanna Schubartt. Following a period of more Baháʼí pioneers coming to the country, Baháʼí Local Spiritual Assemblies spread across Norway while the national community eventually formed a Baháʼí National Spiritual Assembly in 1962. The 2008 national census reported around 1,000 Baháʼís in the country however the Association of Religion Data Archives (relying on World Christian Encyclopedia) estimated some 2700 Baháʼís in 2010.

== Early history ==
The first mentions of the religion happened in the era when Norway was politically united with Sweden; the first mention of the Báb, who Baháʼís view as the herald to the founder of the religion, Baháʼu'lláh, was published in accounts of Persian travels in 1869, and the first mentions of Baháʼu'lláh were made in 1896.

Ragna Linné was a nineteenth and twentieth century classical soprano born in Oslo during the period of Union between Sweden and Norway and of Swedish/Norwegian roots who encountered the Baháʼí Faith after she moved to Chicago. She traveled back to Norway at least in 1908. She was visible as a Baháʼí circa 1908 in newspapers and to 1916 in the magazine Star of the West by Baháʼís. She was at the 1912 convention, attended by ʻAbdu'l-Bahá, then head of the religion.

Swedish Sufi Ivan Aguéli was able to meet ʻAbdu'l-Bahá, in 1912 in Egypt.

=== ʻAbdu'l-Bahá's Tablets of the Divine Plan ===
The next steps in the history of the Baháʼí Faith in Norway start after the political independence of Norway from Sweden in 1905. ʻAbdu'l-Bahá, the son of the founder of the religion, wrote a series of letters, or tablets, to the followers of the religion in the United States in 1916-1917; these letters were compiled together in the book titled Tablets of the Divine Plan. The seventh of the tablets was the first to mention several countries in Europe including beyond where ʻAbdu'l-Bahá had visited in 1911-12 and 1912–13. Written on April 11, 1916, it was delayed in being presented in the United States until 1919 — after the end of World War I and the Spanish flu. World traveling Baháʼí journalist Martha Root's subsequently visited King Haakon VII of Norway among her many trips. The seventh tablet was translated and presented by Mirza Ahmad Sohrab on April 4, 1919, and published in Star of the West magazine on December 12, 1919.

"In brief, this world-consuming war has set such a conflagration to the hearts that no word can describe it. In all the countries of the world the longing for universal peace is taking possession of the consciousness of men. There is not a soul who does not yearn for concord and peace. A most wonderful state of receptivity is being realized.… Therefore, O ye believers of God! Show ye an effort and after this war spread ye the synopsis of the divine teachings in the British Isles, France, Germany, Austria-Hungary, Russia, Italy, Spain, Belgium, Switzerland, Norway, Sweden, Denmark, Holland, Portugal, Rumania, Serbia, Montenegro, Bulgaria, Greece, Andorra, Liechtenstein, Luxembourg, Monaco, San Marino, Balearic Isles, Corsica, Sardinia, Sicily, Crete, Malta, Iceland, Faroe Islands, Shetland Islands, Hebrides and Orkney Islands."

Following the release of these tablets a few Baháʼís began moving to or at least visiting countries across Europe. August Rudd became the first Baháʼí pioneer in Scandinavia (Sweden) in 1920. Johanne Høeg became the first citizen of Denmark to become a Baháʼí (see Baháʼí Faith in Denmark.)

=== Period of pioneers ===
Johanna (Christensen) Schubarth is called the "Mother Baháʼí of Norway". She was born in 1877 in Sandefjord. She moved to the United States and learned of the Baháʼí Faith from May Maxwell in 1919. She returned to Norway in 1927. Dagmar Dole was another early pioneer. In 1934 Martha Root returned to Oslo for a number of speaking engagements through 1935 and met up with Lidia Zamenhof whom she had known for a decade since her conversion to the religion, for some Esperanto conventions. A 1946 telegram of Shoghi Effendi, head of the religion after the death of ʻAbdu'l-Bahá, called for pioneers to the capitals of several countries including Norway. The first Local Spiritual Assembly of Oslo formed in 1948 with Schubartt. A 1950 European Teaching Conference in Denmark, including Dagmar Dole, coordinated pioneers - two Americans settled in the Lofoten Islands in 1953 and in 1955 a pioneer reached extreme northern Norway in Båtsfjord Municipality. Schubarth died in 1952 and is buried in Oslo. Svalbard is sometimes mentioned as a remote location - it's off northern Norway. A Baháʼí had settled there in 1958.

== Development ==
The first Local Spiritual Assembly was formed in Oslo in 1948. As the religion spread across Scandinavia it reached the point where a regional National Spiritual Assembly for Norway, Finland, Sweden and Denmark was established in 1957. Meanwhile, pioneers continued to arrive from other counties—a British Baháʼí settled for a time in Spitsbergen in 1958 though later a Norwegian couple moved there in 1970. The second Norwegian Local Spiritual Assembly formed in Bergen in 1955, and a third in Stavanger in 1960.

In 1962-3 Norway added two Local Spiritual Assemblies in Bergen, and Hetland, with smaller groups between one and nine adults in Bærum and Faana and isolated Baháʼís in Ås, Harstad, Kristiansund, Laksevåg, Narvik, Sandefjord, Sandnes, and Stokmarknes.

In 1962 Norway, also, elected its own National Spiritual Assembly. The Sami people had a Local Spiritual Assembly in Trondheim in 1969 with the conversion of the first of their people to the Baháʼí Faith. In 1973 Local Assemblies were added in Lillehammer, Bærum and Bodø; in 1979 in Hurum and Gjøvik and in 1984 in Tromsø.

Since its inception the religion has had involvement in socio-economic development beginning by giving greater freedom to women, promulgating the promotion of female education as a priority concern, and that involvement was given practical expression by creating schools, agricultural coops, and clinics. The religion entered a new phase of activity when a message of the Universal House of Justice dated 20 October 1983 was released. Baháʼís were urged to seek out ways, compatible with the Baháʼí teachings, in which they could become involved in the social and economic development of the communities in which they lived. Worldwide in 1979 there were 129 officially recognized Baháʼí socio-economic development projects. By 1987, the number of officially recognized development projects had increased to 1482. The National Spiritual Assembly of Norway established an institution—the Norwegian Agency for International Development Cooperation—and in 1988 it began a working relationship with India's New Era Development Institute (see New Era High School), with support for a two-year rural community development program. In 1989, funding was extended to cover a one-year community development facilitators course and short courses on agriculture, rural technology, literacy, and domestic science. But controversy has also served to focus the efforts of the community. In 1983 the Universal House of Justice, current elected head of the religion, addressed a letter to the National Assembly of the Baháʼís of Norway concerning practices of meditation—it appears many Norwegian Baháʼís were particularly attracted to the practice but had differences of opinion about the place and practice of meditation. In an attempt to start "a campaign of spiritualization of the Baháʼí community" called for by the House of Justice, a committee in Norway had established a meditation class at a summer school that offered one particular method. Observing that as Baháʼu'lláh had not outlined any method of mediation, the House of Justice cautioned that any private personal choice on a method of meditation should not be institutionalized or mandated. The House of Justice elaborated that the community was struggling with the regrettable atmosphere of appalling suffering brought on by religions in the past -that there had arisen a kind of revulsion of various kinds of personal and public spiritual practices of religion that the Baháʼí Faith nevertheless does stress and outlined them as follows:

- The recital each day of one of the Obligatory Baháʼí prayers with pure-hearted devotion.
- The regular reading of the Sacred Scriptures, specifically at least each morning and evening, with reverence, attention and thought.
- Prayerful meditation on the Baháʼí teachings, so that we may understand them more deeply, fulfil them more faithfully, and convey them more accurately to others.
- Striving every day to bring our behaviour more into accordance with the high standards that are set forth in these teachings.
- Teaching the religion.
- Selfless service in the work of the religion and in the carrying on of our trade or profession.

From 1998 through 2001 the Baháʼí International Community and the National Spiritual Assembly of the Baháʼís of Norway committed to participating in Norwegian interfaith initiatives resulting in an Oslo Declaration on Freedom of Religion or Belief.

== Current community ==
In the late 1990s by one count there were 173 Baháʼís per million population in Norway which implies around 800 Baháʼís while by 2005 a Norwegian Census reports just over 1000 Baháʼís. The Association of Religion Data Archives (relying on World Christian Encyclopedia) estimated some 2,700 Baháʼís in 2010. In May 2001 the Baháʼí youth gathered for "Project Panacea" for a Baháʼí Youth Workshop (see Oscar DeGruy) including public performances. There have been successive Youth Conferences across Scandinavia since 2004 and there exists a Baháʼí Student Club of Oslo University. In July 2008, the Norwegian translation of the Kitáb-i-Aqdas was unveiled.

In 2000 Norway rose in support of a United Nations human rights resolution about concern over the Baháʼís in Iran as well as taking steps to further document conditions. The Norwegian government supported the declaration of the Presidency of the European Union when he "denounced" the trial of Iranian Baháʼís announced in February 2009. See Persecution of Baháʼís.

== Prominent individuals ==
Lasse Thoresen has been a Baháʼí since about 1971 (he was elected as NSA Secretary in 1975) and is a professor with the Norwegian Academy of Music with a graduate degree in composition from the Oslo Music Conservatory, where he studied under Finn Mortensen. From 1988 to 2000 Thoresen occupied the principal chair of composition at the Norwegian Academy of Music in Oslo. Among his compositions is The Carmel Eulogies, a symphony that premiered in Oslo in 1993 with repeated performances since. Commissioned by the Oslo Philharmonic Orchestra on the occasion of its 75th jubilee, the symphony consists of two parts, "Fragrances of Mercy" and "Circumambulations." The rhythm of saying "Allah'u'Abha" ("God the All-Glorious") is inherent in the work, which is based on the Baháʼu'lláh's Tablet of Carmel. The symphony was critically acclaimed, and many members of the audience were visibly moved during the performance. It was broadcast live on national radio and taped for later airing on the national television network.

Margun Risa is another Norwegian Baháʼí artist - she's a singer/teacher who studied at Rogaland academy in Stavanger. Risa became a Baháʼí about 1976 and in 1986 was invited to sing for the opening of the Lotus Temple in New Delhi. In 1992 Thoresen asked Risa to sing as part of the opening of the Second Baháʼí World Congress. Later Risa studied under Anne Brown, an American who was the first to sing the part of Bess in Gershwin's opera, Porgy and Bess.

== See also ==
- Religion in Norway
- History of Norway
- Baháʼí Faith in Denmark
- Baháʼí Faith in Finland
- Baháʼí Faith in Sweden
