= Baháʼí Faith in Denmark =

The Baháʼí Faith in Denmark began in 1925, but it was more than 20 years before the Baháʼí community in Denmark began to grow after the arrival of American Baháʼí pioneers in 1946. Following that period of growth, the community established its Baháʼí National Spiritual Assembly in 1962. In 2002, Baháʼí sources indicate about 300 Baháʼís, including both Iranian Baháʼí refugees and Danish converts. The Association of Religion Data Archives (relying mostly on the World Christian Encyclopedia) estimated some 1,200 Baháʼís in 2005.

== Early history ==
=== ʻAbdu'l-Bahá's Tablets of the Divine Plan ===
ʻAbdu'l-Bahá, the son of the founder of the religion, wrote a series of letters, or tablets, to the followers of the religion in the United States in 1916–1917; these letters were compiled together in the book titled Tablets of the Divine Plan. The seventh of the tablets was the first to mention several countries in Europe including beyond where ʻAbdu'l-Bahá had visited in 1911–12. Written on April 11, 1916, it was delayed in being presented in the United States until 1919 — after the end of World War I and the Spanish flu. World traveling Baháʼí journalist Martha Root subsequently visited King Haakon VII of Norway among her many trips. The seventh tablet was translated and presented by Mirza Ahmad Sohrab on April 4, 1919, and published in Star of the West magazine on December 12, 1919.

"In brief, this world-consuming war has set such a conflagration to the hearts that no word can describe it. In all the countries of the world the longing for universal peace is taking possession of the consciousness of men. There is not a soul who does not yearn for concord and peace. A most wonderful state of receptivity is being realized.… Therefore, O ye believers of God! Show ye an effort and after this war spread ye the synopsis of the divine teachings in the British Isles, France, Germany, Austria-Hungary, Russia, Italy, Spain, Belgium, Switzerland, Norway, Sweden, Denmark, Holland, Portugal, Rumania, Serbia, Montenegro, Bulgaria, Greece, Andorra, Liechtenstein, Luxembourg, Monaco, San Marino, Balearic Isles, Corsica, Sardinia, Sicily, Crete, Malta, Iceland, Faroe Islands, Shetland Islands, Hebrides and Orkney Islands."

=== First Baháʼís ===
Following the release of these tablets a few Baháʼís began moving to Scandinavian countries:

- August Rudd became the first Baháʼí pioneer in Scandinavia (Sweden) in 1920.
- Johanna Schubartt moved to the United States and learned of the Baháʼí Faith from May Maxwell, Ruhiyyih Khanum's mother, in 1919 and returned to Norway in 1927.
- Johanne Sørensen, a Dane, became a Baháʼí while in the Territory of Hawaii in 1925. Returning to Denmark in the same year, she was the country's first Baháʼí, though there would be no others for 22 years perhaps in part due to her introverted personality. During those years she was involved with translating, or seeing to translations being done, and corresponded in over 100 letters with Shoghi Effendi, then the head of the religion, about the translation work. In 1926 Sørensen published a translation credited as a work of John Esslemont's the year after his death. She then translated John Esslemont's Baháʼu'lláh and the New Era which drew approving academic review. But there were no other converts to the religion during this early period. Sørensen remained active in her translation work until the community elected a Local Spiritual Assembly which then held the authority for the community's translating endeavours.

=== Period of Pioneers ===
Starting in 1946, following World War II, Shoghi Effendi drew up plans for the American (US and Canada) Baháʼí community to send pioneers to Europe including Denmark; the pioneers set up a European Teaching Committee chaired by Edna True. Prominent members of the committee included the women Dagmar Dole and Elenoir Holliboaugh who arrived in Denmark in 1947 and who helped establish Denmark's first Baháʼí community with the first converts in Denmark – May Vestby and Palle Bischoff. Bischoff later pioneered to Greenland. Many of the early converts were supporters of the Det Radikale Venstre political party as part of a modern liberal outlook. From 1948 to 1952 thirty eight individuals converted to the Baháʼí Faith and none withdrew. In 1949 the first Baháʼí Local Spiritual Assembly in the country was elected in Copenhagen, and in 1950 the Danish community hosted a number of continent-wide European Baháʼí events though still having about 50 Baháʼís in the community. One of these meetings was a Conference coordinating pioneers to several places in Norway. Some credit the success of the American pioneers in Denmark to the Danes being attracted to their "cultural style" – "emancipated, independent, and idealistic". In 1957 Denmark, Scandinavia and Finland together formed a regional Baháʼí National Spiritual Assembly.

== Establishment ==
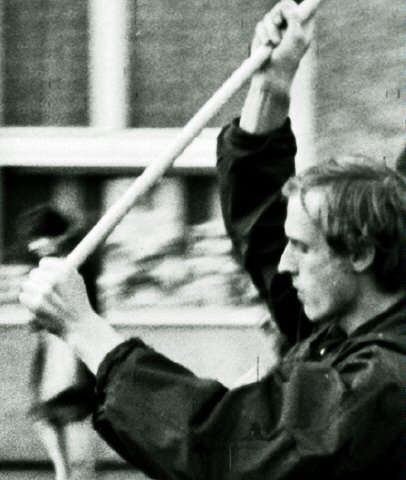
Protester strains under weight of Vietnamese flag carried in anti-war march in West Berlin, 1969.

In 1960, shortly after the death of Shoghi Effendi and the culminating period of the Ten Year Crusade, which was an international Baháʼí teaching plan, Denmark became the home of some Iranian Baháʼís, increasing the community's population to over 60, and the Danish National Spiritual Assembly was formed in 1962. In the wake of the 1968-9 cultural changes across Europe including youth movements, war and environmental issues protests. most Baháʼí communities experienced sizable growth; from 1971 to 1974 the community nearly doubled. By 1979 the community's progressing organization of assemblies and petitioning, lead to government recognition of the Baháʼí Faith as a legal institution with privileges, including the authority to grant marriages. In 1979 with the Iranian Revolution and its severe persecution of Baháʼís, which continues past 2007, many thousands of Iranian Baháʼís fled the country and the portion that came to Denmark almost doubled the community's population again.

== Modern community ==
Since its inception the religion has had involvement in socio-economic development beginning by giving greater freedom to women, promulgating the promotion of female education as a priority concern, and that involvement was given practical expression by creating schools, agricultural coops, and clinics. The religion entered a new phase of activity when a message of the Universal House of Justice dated 20 October 1983 was released. Baháʼís were urged to seek out ways, compatible with the Baháʼí teachings, in which they could become involved in the social and economic development of the communities in which they lived. Worldwide in 1979 there were 129 officially recognized Baháʼí socio-economic development projects. By 1987, the number of officially recognized development projects had increased to 1482. Though a small proportion in a nation of over 5 million, yet in 1995 when Denmark hosted the United Nations World Summit for Social Development the Baháʼís participated in an NGO contribution to the Summit as well as to the NGO-Forum held alongside. Additionally the Baháʼís of Denmark are an object of academic study by University of Copenhagen Professor Margit Warburg and her students.

=== Demographics ===
As of 2002 there are local estimates there are some 300 Baháʼís in Denmark, and the community has also spread beyond Copenhagen into the countryside and rural provinces. It has been shown that there is a mix of liberal and conservative world views among the Baháʼís of the Denmark community from academic study. The Association of Religion Data Archives (relying on World Christian Encyclopedia) estimated some 1,251 Baháʼís in 2005.

== See also ==
- Baháʼí Faith in Norway
- Baháʼí Faith in Finland
- Baháʼí Faith in Sweden
- Religion in Denmark
- Demographics of Denmark
- Counterculture of the 1960s and Youth subculture and Protests of 1968.
- World Social Forum
