= Gina Zurlo =

American historian, sociologist

Gina Zurlo is an American historian, sociologist and a scholar of history of mission and world Christianity. She is a senior researcher and lecturer in World Christianity at Harvard Divinity School. She is a visiting research fellow at Boston University Institute on Culture, Religion and World Affairs. She previously was co-director of the Center for the Study of Global Christianity. Zurlo was named in the BBC 100 most inspiring and influential women from around the world in 2019 for her work in religious statistics and female future of religion.

== Education ==
Zurlo studied for her Ph.D. in history and hermeneutics at Boston University School of Theology under the direction of Dana Robert and graduated in 2017. Her dissertation was focused on the role of quantification in the development of world Christianity, with special focus on the work of Anglican missionary to Kenya, David B. Barrett.

== Career ==
Zurlo teaches sociology of religion, world Christianity, and women in world Christianity at Harvard. She is a member of the Society for the Scientific Study of Religion and the Religious Research Association. She is a co-editor of the World Religion Database (Brill).
