= Department of Cross-Cultural and Regional Studies (University of Copenhagen) =

The Department of Cross-Cultural and Regional Studies (Danish: Institut for Tværkulturelle og Regionale Studier) or ToRS is a department at the Faculty of the Humanities at the University of Copenhagen. It is the home to several area and language studies disciplines focused in geographical areas outside of Europe, as well as comparative religious studies and cross-cultural and minority studies. It was founded in 2004 at the fusion of several earlier departments. The department is headed by associate professor Annika Hvithamar.

Notable Professors:

- Kim Ryholt, Professor of Egyptology
- Margit Warburg, professor emerita of Sociology of Religion
- Una Canger, Lektor emerita of Native American languages and Cultures
