= Lasse Thoresen =

Norwegian composer (born 1949)

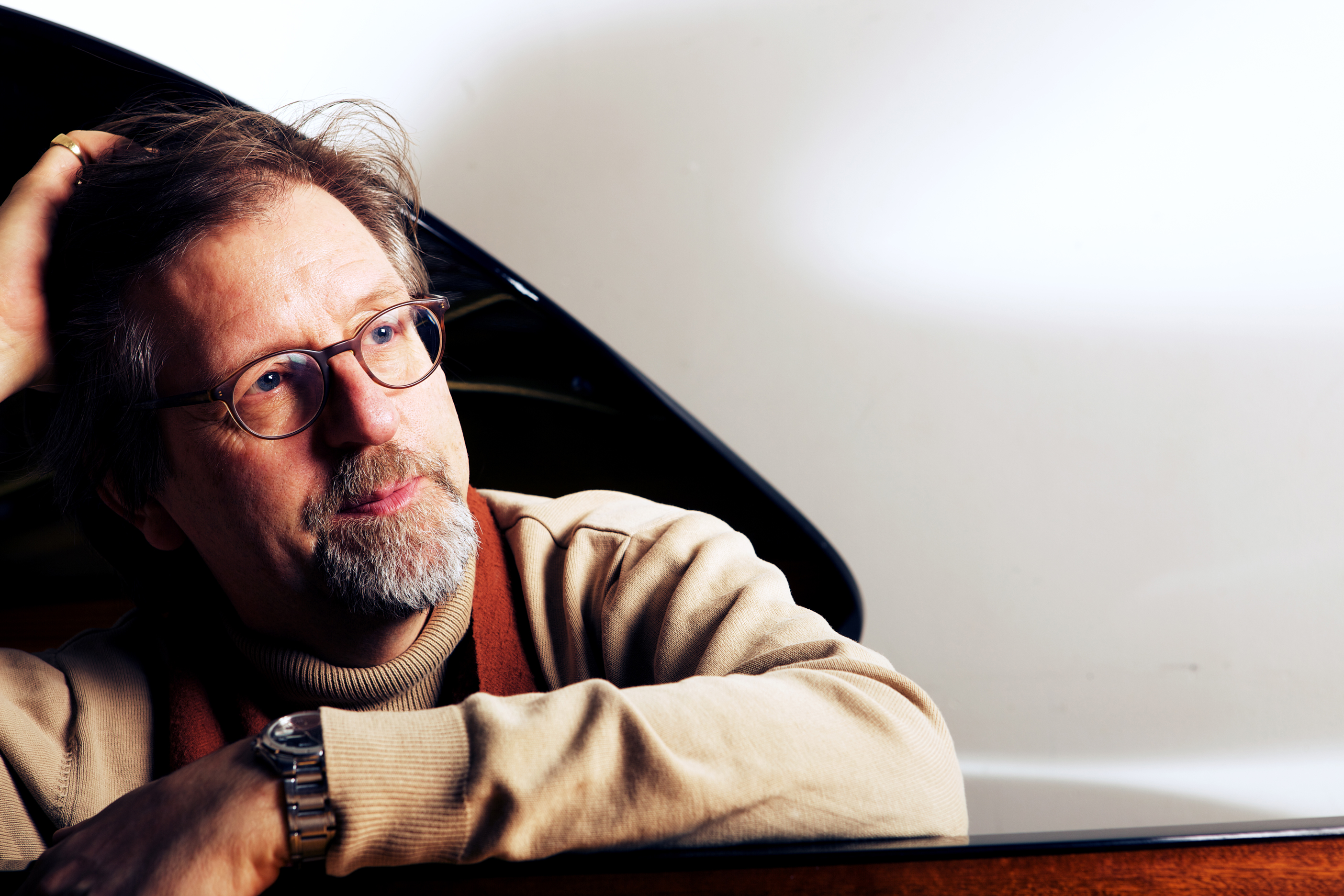
- Born: October 18, 1949 (age 76); Oslo, Norway
- Occupation: Composer

Lasse Thoresen (born 18 October 1949) is a Norwegian composer whose works concentrate on a contemporary transformation of the folk-music traditions of many peoples, especially those of Scandinavia.

== Biography ==
Thoresen was born in Oslo in 1949 and studied with Finn Mortensen at the Norwegian Academy of Music, graduating in 1972. He studied electroacoustic music in Utrecht, and musique concrète and spectral music in Paris. He has been professor of composition at the Norwegian Academy of Music since 1988. Thoresen has received many commissions for works which have been performed across Scandinavia, including commissions from all the major Norwegian Philharmonic Orchestras and the French National Radio.

An important source of inspiration for Thoresen has been the Baháʼí religion whose texts he has set in many works. His oratorio Terraces of Light (2000) was performed at the inauguration of the 19 terraces of the Baháʼí holy place on Mount Carmel, by forces from Canada, Austria, Israel and Transylvania.

Thoresen was winner of the 2010 Nordic Council Music Prize for his work Opus 42, which consists of four pieces written for the vocal group Nordic Voices.

== Selected works ==
- Bird of the Heart, piano trio (1982)
- Symphonic Concerto for Violin and Orchestra (1984)
- Illuminations, double concerto for two celli and orchestra (1985)
- AbUno (1992)
- The symphonic poem Emergence (1997)
- Traces of Light (2000)
- Løp, Lokk og Linjar for folk singer and sinfonietta (2002)
- Transfigurations, triple concerto (2003)
- The Descent of Luminous Waters, piano trio (2003)
- To the Brother Peoples, double concerto for hardingfele and nyckelharpa (2005)
- Tidehverv (At a Juncture), 3 Pieces for viola and cello (2007)
- Opus 42, four vocal works

== Discography ==
- Nordic Voices, Himmelkvad (2012)
- Ragnhild Hemsing, Yr (2011)
- Bergen Philharmonic Orchestra, Lasse Thoresen - To The Brother Peoples (2009)
- Grieg Trio, Beethoven - Thoresen (2007)
- Aage Kvalbein, Ten Norwegian Short Stories (2005)
- Oslo Strykekvartett, The Silver Chord (2002)
- Oslo Sinfonietta, Norges Musikkhistore Bind 5 (2001)
- Haifa Symfoniorkester, The Mount Carmel Terraces - Official Opening (2001)
- Saxofon Concentus, Second Tale (2000)
- Christian Eggen, Norges Musikkhøgskole Symfoniorkester & Kor, Lasse Thoresen - som Bølger på Ett Hav (2000)
- The Norwegian Soloists' Choir, Hear (1999)
- The Sonic Mind (1998)
- The Norwegian Soloists' Choir, From the Sweet-scented Streams of Eternity / Lasse Thoresen (1998)
- Lasse Thoresen (1998)

== See also ==
- Baháʼí Faith in Norway

== Sources ==
- "Lasse Thoresen – Composer, Professor". Music Information Centre Norway. Archived from the original on 2009-07-10.
- "Lasse Thoresen Homepage". 2009.
- Notes to Aurora ACD 5058
