= Annika Hvithamar =

Danish sociologist

Annika Hvithamar (born 1971) is a Danish Sociologist of religion, who serves as head of the Department of Cross-Cultural and Regional Studies at the University of Copenhagen. Her research specializes in religion in Russia including the Russian Orthodox Church and religious minorities such as Jehovah's Witnesses. She received her PhD in Sociology of Religion from the University of Copenhagen in 2003.

== Notable works ==
- Hvithamar, Annika. 2016. "Not Just Caviar and Balalaikas: Unity and Division in Russian Orthodox Congregations in Denmark." Orthodox Identities in Western Europe: Migration, Settlement and Innovation (2016): 213.
- Hvithamar, A. 2008. Sacred Stories: Religion and Spirituality in Modern Russia. Journal of Religion in Europe, 1(3), pp. 358–360.
- Hvithamar, Annika. 20015. "Jehovas Vidner. I grænsefladen af den danske religionsmodel." Religionsvidenskabeligt tidsskrift 62: 125–137.
- Hvithamar, Annika. 2009. Ruslands ikoner: fra brugskunst til billedkunst (Russian Icons: From craft to art). Gyldendal A/S, 2009.
