= Baháʼí Faith in the Philippines =

The Baháʼí Faith in the Philippines is a community of Filipinos, who like their fellow Baháʼís living in other parts of the world, view the world's major religions as a part of a single, progressive process through which God reveals His will to humanity. They recognize Baha'u'llah, the founder of the Baha'i Faith, as the most recent in a line of Divine Messengers that includes Abraham, Moses, Buddha, Zoroaster, Christ and Muhammad.

It is composed of Filipinos from various ethnic and religious background. The religion first reached the country in 1921 with a Baháʼí first visiting the Philippines that year. By 1944 the first Baháʼí Local Spiritual Assembly in the country was established in Solano, Nueva Vizcaya.

In the early 1960s, during a period of accelerated growth, the community grew from 200 in 1960 to 1000 by 1962 and 2000 by 1963. In 1964 the National Spiritual Assembly of the Baháʼís of the Philippines was elected and by 1980 there were 64000 Baháʼís and 45 local assemblies.

The Baháʼís have been active in multi/inter-faith developments. The Association of Religion Data Archives (relying on World Christian Encyclopedia) estimates the Baháʼí population of the Philippines at about 272,600.

== Early history ==
The first mention of the Philippines in Baháʼí literature, is in a letter from 1911 by ʻAbdu'l-Bahá, the son of the founder of the religion. Later he wrote a series of letters, or tablets, to the followers of the religion in the United States in 1916-1917 asking the followers of the religion to travel to other countries; these letters were compiled together in the book titled Tablets of the Divine Plan. The seventh of the tablets was the first to mention several island nations in the Pacific Ocean. Written on April 11, 1916, it was delayed in being presented in the United States until 1919 — after the end of World War I and the Spanish flu. The seventh tablet was translated and presented by Mirza Ahmad Sohrab on April 4, 1919, and published in Star of the West magazine on December 12, 1919.

"A party speaking their languages, severed, holy, sanctified and filled with the love of God, must turn their faces to and travel through the three great island groups of the Pacific Ocean—Polynesia, Micronesia and Melanesia, and the islands attached to these groups, such as New Guinea, Borneo, Java, Sumatra, Philippine Islands, Solomon Islands, Fiji Islands, New Hebrides, Loyalty Islands, New Caledonia, Bismarck Archipelago, Ceram, Celebes, Friendly Islands, Samoa Islands, Society Islands, Caroline Islands, Low Archipelago, Marquesas, Hawaiian Islands, Gilbert Islands, Moluccas, Marshall Islands, Timor and the other islands. With hearts overflowing with the love of God, with tongues commemorating the mention of God, with eyes turned to the Kingdom of God, they must deliver the glad tidings of the manifestation of the Lord of Hosts to all the people."

Mirza Hossein R. Touty (perhaps a transliteration of "Tiati"), a Persian Baháʼí and subscriber to Star of the West, travelled to the Philippine Islands in 1921 before the death of ʻAbdu'l-Bahá, during American territorial period. Touty arrived via Shanghai, then Vladivostok and came to Mindanao in the Philippines, ending up in Surigao, in January 1921 for a time. In 1926 both Siegfried Schopflocher and Martha Root, both later entitled as Hands of the Cause, were able to give talks in Manila. Touty left the Philippines in 1926.

In 1938 Felix Maddela became the first Filipino Baháʼí. His first encounter with the Baháʼí Faith was in 1924 when a purchase he made was wrapped in a piece of old newspaper which contained an article by Martha Root about the religion. As the author's address did not appear in the article, it was another 14 years before he encountered more about the religion. In the early spring of 1937, Loulie Albee Mathews arrived in Manila on board the "Franconia." As the boat was to dock for only a few hours, she managed to place in a college library a few pamphlets for the shelf of comparative religions. A few months later, on a visit to Manila from Solano, Nueva Vizcaya, Mr. Maddela came across the literature. This started a series of correspondence with the Baháʼí Publishing Committee of the United States. With Madella so fired up, he immediately taught his family and friends. Shortly before World War II, the Baháʼí's of Solano numbered around fifty. When war broke out all communications ceased. Immediately after the war, contact was re-established through Alvin Blum, who was attached to the medical unit of the United States Army. Hitch-hiking to Solano, which was in ruins, he located the Maddelas living in impoverished conditions. Of the fifty enrolled Baháʼí's, twenty-five had been killed or missing. The others had survived by hiding in rice fields for three years.

On December 2, 1946, the Local Spiritual Assembly of the Baháʼí's of Solano was incorporated. The members and incorporators were Felix Maddela, Angustia Maddela, Zacarias Tottoc, Mariano Tagubat, Nicanora Lorenzo, Dionisia Vadel, Maurelio Bueza, Jacinta Piggangay and Azucena Cruz. In 1947, Mr. Dominador Anunsacion and his brother Angelo traveled to Solano, heard and accepted the Faith. Upon their return to Santiago, Isabela another community was established.

Hazel Mori, an American, became a Baháʼí in the US in 1941, and later moved to the Philippines as a Baha'i pioneer. For more than ten years she served as treasurer of the National Spiritual Assembly of the Baháʼís of the Philippines when it was formed later. Others, heeding the call of Shoghi Effendi, then head of the Baháʼí Faith, also visited Philippines. These were Nina Nadler, William Allison, Miss Virginia Breaks, and Michael Jamir. Hand of the Cause Agnes Baldwin Alexander also visited the Philippines six or seven times from 1958 to 1964. In 1956, the Local Spiritual Assemblies of Rosario and Diffun were established. The first Baháʼí Summer School was held in Solano in 1958. The Local Spiritual Assembly of Manila was also established in 1959.

Luisa Mapa Gomez was the first Baháʼí of Manila. Born in Talisay, Negros Occidental, she was the daughter of a prominent doctor, and graduated from the University of the Philippines College of Education. She sponsored countless students to attend elementary, high schools and colleges. After the visit of Mrs. Mori to the Philippines in 1953, and after attending firesides in the home of Mrs. Nina Adler, who was then working in the American Embassy, "Momsu", as she was fondly called, accepted the Faith.

== Developing community ==
Areas with tribal groups

In 1960 the Baháʼí community of the Philippines consisted of four local spiritual assemblies and a population of about 200. In 1961, Hand of the Cause, Dr. Rahmatu'lláh Muhájir arrived in Manila for the first of his numerous visits. The handful of believers in Solano, Santiago and Manila were empowered to overcome natural shyness and to reach out to masses in these provinces.

Bill Allison, Jack Davis, Vivian Bayona, Grace Maddela, Philip Flores, Baltazar Mariano, Len Scott, Vic Samaniego and Freddie Santiago were among those who assisted others in the process of entry to the Faith. Gradually, Dr. Muhajir encouraged everyone to expand beyond Isabela and Nueva Vizcaya into other provinces. By 1962 there were reports of mass conversions with 24 Local Spiritual Assemblies and 1000 converts.

By 1963 there were 2000 Baháʼís and there were several specific tribes known to have converts - Ifugao, Igorot, Ilocano, Ilongot, Kalinga, Negritoes, Pangasinan, and Tagalog. There were villages where the inhabitants were all Baháʼís. Dr. Muhájir, accompanied by Ms. Vivian Bayona, introduced the religion to the Bilaan tribe in Mindanao. Datu Eloy Epa, the tribal chief, accepted the Faith.

In 1964, National Spiritual Assembly was elected for the first time. The members were Vicente Samaniego, Pablo Mercado, Jack Davis, Neva Dulay, Luisa Mapa Gomez, Dominador Anunsacion, Ruth Walbridge, Theo Boehnert and Orpha Daugherty. That year, Dr. Muhájir visited the island of Mindoro and walked for eight hours across mountainous terrain to reach the Mangyan tribes. The religion was received with immediate acceptance. One new declarant, Rogelio Onella, began using a room in his house to teach literacy classes to fellow tribesmen. This small class developed further into the 'Rogelio Onella Memorial School' and served as nucleus of four tutorial schools among the tribes.

By 1980 there were 45 Local Spiritual Assemblies and 64,000 adherents. During this period the only Hand of the Cause to visit the interior of the country was Rahmatu'lláh Muhájir though Agnes Baldwin Alexander and Collis Featherstone also visited the country. This large scale growth was generally true across Southeast Asia in the 1950s and 1960s.

In late July 1972 three Iranian Baháʼí students of Mindanao State University were murdered. Parvíz Sadeghi, Farámarz Vujdání and Parvíz Furúghí were killed while traveling in rural Muslim areas of Mindanao. After recovering their mutilated bodies from a shallow grave a convocation was held and funeral procession attended by thousands of people including fellow students, faculty members and university officials.

== Modern community ==
Since its inception the religion has had involvement in socio-economic development beginning by giving greater freedom to women, promulgating the promotion of female education as a priority concern, and that involvement was given practical expression by creating schools, agricultural coops, and clinics. The religion entered a new phase of activity when a message of the Universal House of Justice dated 20 October 1983 was released.

Baháʼís were urged to seek out ways, compatible with the Baháʼí teachings, in which they could become involved in the social and economic development of the communities in which they lived. Worldwide in 1979, there were 129 officially recognized Baháʼí socio-economic development projects. By 1987, the number of officially recognized development projects had increased to 1,482. The Baháʼí community in the Philippines has been active in the country on several different areas.

A curriculum on Values education for public secondary schools in the Philippines was initially developed by a team of Baháʼí educators and was then completed as a doctoral dissertation. The curriculum was to be offered to the Department of Education, Culture and Sports of the Philippine government to be used for "Values Education", a subject taught in Philippine public secondary schools. A Baháʼí AM radio station was also officially launched in the Philippines on 29 November 2002 in Nueva Ecija province registered as station DZDF. A Baháʼí National Arts Festival was held between 26 and 29 December 2004 in Baguio with Baháʼís from 20 localities.

Internationally, the National Spiritual Assembly of Baháʼís of the Philippines participated in the Conference on Interfaith Cooperation for Peace hosted by the Filipino Department of Foreign Affairs held in 2005 in New York which was attended by the President of the Committee of Religious NGOs in the UN. The Philippines community hosted a regional conference of Baháʼís totaling over 1,000—nearly 700 people from the Philippines itself were joined by Baháʼís from Japan, Hong Kong, Taiwan, Macau, Caroline Islands, Mariana Islands, and the Marshall Islands.

=== Demographics ===
The 2000 census stated that about 2%, or about 1.53 million people, were classified as "Other" in the religious field (non-Christian, non-Muslim, and negligible Buddhist religious communities). The Association of Religion Data Archives (relying on World Christian Encyclopedia) estimates the Baháʼí population of the Philippines at about 272,600.

== See also ==
- Baháʼí Faith by country
- Religion in the Philippines
- History of the Philippines
