= Kilo, Espoo =

Kilo
- District of Espoo
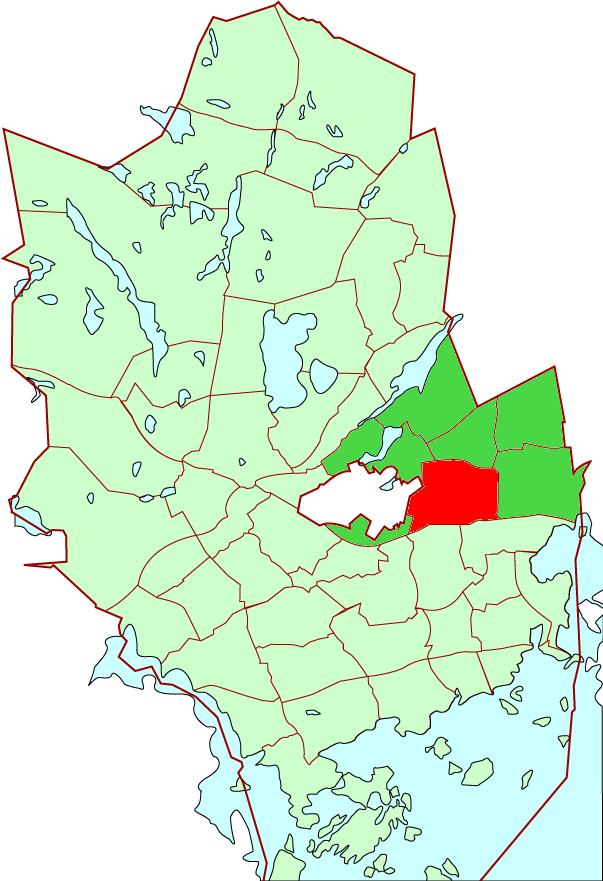
- Location of Kilo within Espoo
- Coordinates: 60°13′N 24°47′E
- Country: Finland
- Municipality: Espoo
- Region: Uusimaa
- Sub-region: Greater Helsinki
- Main District: Suur-Leppävaara
- Inner District(s): Kuninkainen, Nuijala, Lansa

Population (2006)
  - Total: 14,327

Languages
  - Finnish: 83.8 %
  - Swedish: 6.6 %
  - Other: 9.6 %
- Jobs: 9,965

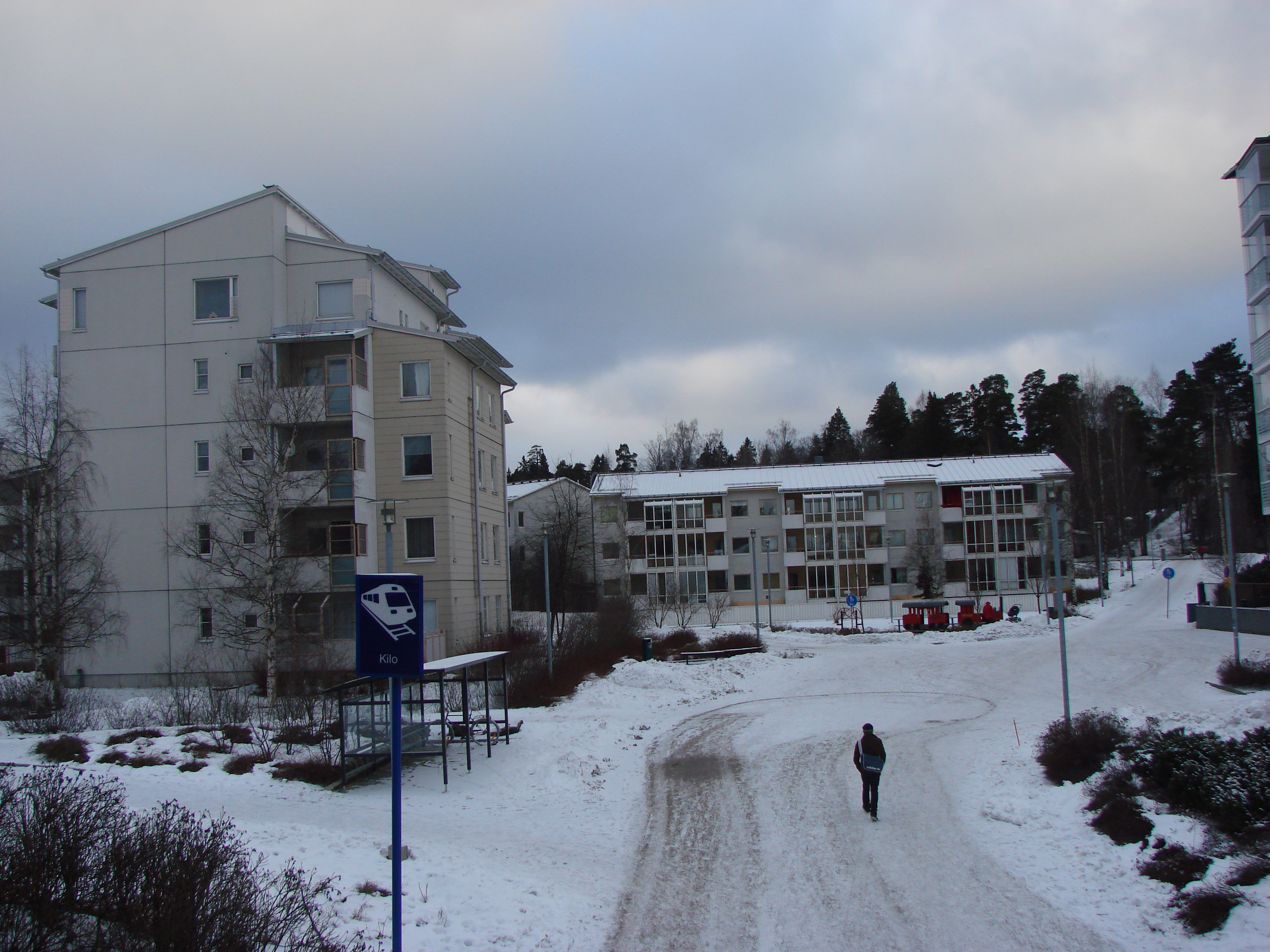
A view of Kilo from the local train station

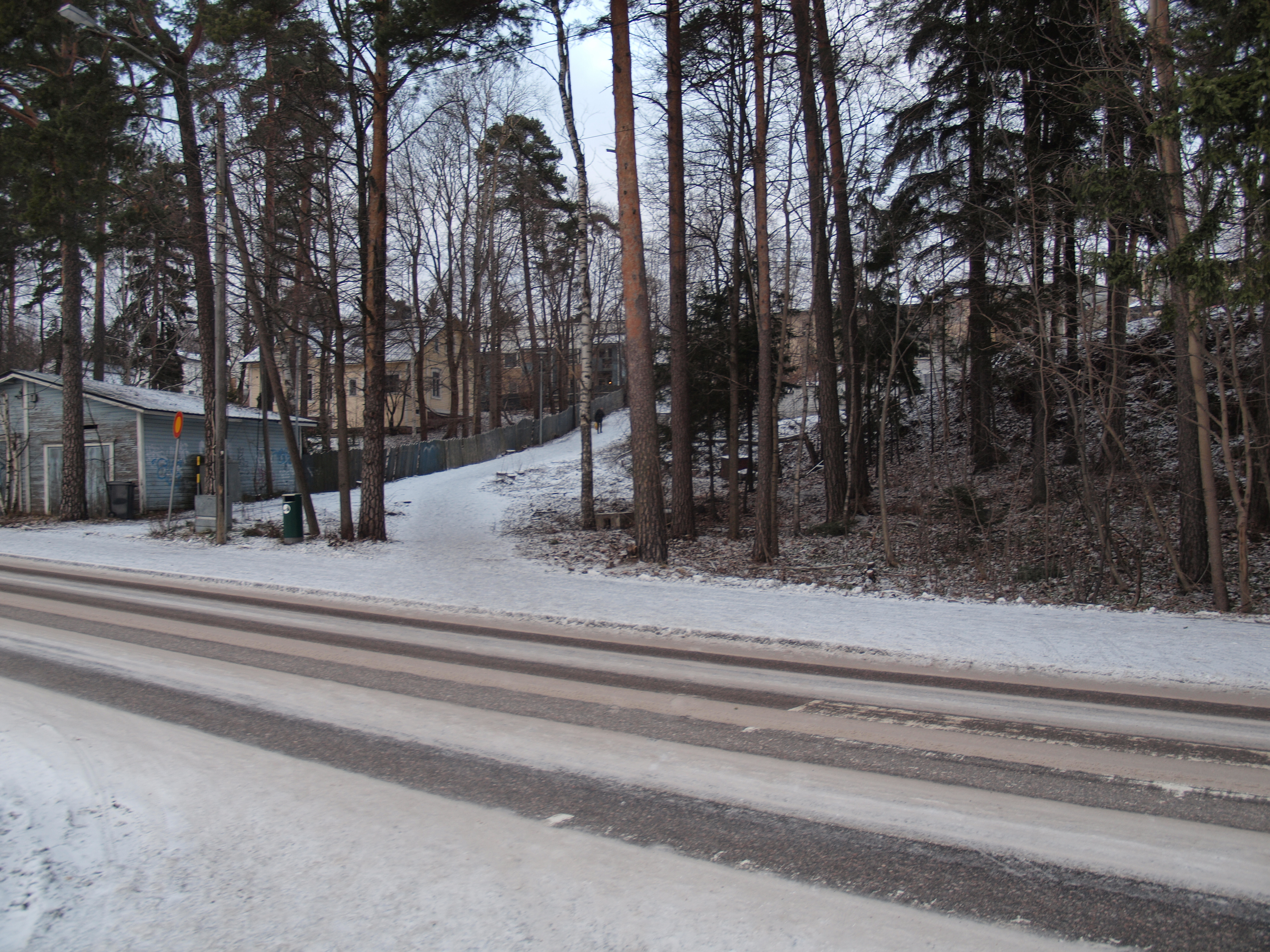
Wooden houses in Kilo

Kilo is a district of Espoo, a city in Finland. Kilo is a place of homes and small industry. The head police station of Espoo is located in Kilo.

There is a shortage of services in Kilo. For example, to visit the post office or the pharmacist, one would have to go to neighbouring district Leppävaara or the neighbouring municipality of Kauniainen.

== See also ==
- Districts of Espoo
- Ring II
