= Kanichi Yamamoto =

First Japanese Baha'i

Kanichi Yamamoto (1879–1961) was the first Japanese Baháʼí. He joined the religion in 1902. Some of his children also decided to join the Baháʼí Faith. Of Yamamoto, who heard of the Baháʼí Faith in Honolulu, ʻAbdu'l-Baha said,

"thou...art the single one of Japan and the unique one of the extreme Orient."

Yamamoto remained a staunch and ardent Baha'i until his death in 1961.

== See also ==
- Baháʼí Faith in Japan
