= Eliz Sanasarian =

American political scientist

Eliz Sanasarian is an Iranian-American professor of political science at the University of Southern California. She is best known for her expertise and books on ethnic politics and feminism, particularly regarding the Middle East and Iran. Sanasarian joined the faculty in 1985.

== Bibliography ==
- 1982 - Women's rights movement in Iran : mutiny, appeasement, and repression from 1900 to Khomeini, Praeger Publishers, ISBN 0-03-059632-7.
- 1992 - Women and development in the Middle East and North Africa / edited by Joseph G. Jabbra and Nancy W. Jabbra, ISBN 90-04-09529-2.
- 2000 - Religious minorities in Iran, Cambridge University Press, ISBN 0-521-77073-4.
- 2007 - Global Feminism: Transnational Women's Activism, Organizing, and Human Rights. Perspectives On Politics. pp. 842–843.
- 2007 - The Fire, the Star and the Cross: Minority Religions in Medieval and Early Modern Iran.

== Honors and awards ==
- Best Research Book on Women, Sedigheh Dovlatabadi Library, Tehran, 2006–2007
- USC or School/Dept Award for Teaching, Political Science Award for Outstanding Classroom Teaching and Dedication to Students, 1997–1998
- USC Raubenheimer Outstanding Junior Faculty Award, President's Circle Faculty Award for Outstanding Merit in Teaching, Research, and Service, 1987
