= Saichiro Fujita =

Saichirō Fujita (藤田左弌郎, Fujita Saichirō; 1886 – 1976), a native of Yamaguchi Prefecture, was the second Japanese to become a member of the Baháʼí Faith from Japan. He was also distinguished by serving for many years at the Baháʼí World Centre through many of the heads of the religion from the time of ʻAbdu'l-Bahá, Shoghi Effendi, the period of the Custodians, and then the Universal House of Justice.

While attending school in Oakland, California he joined the religion in 1904-5. Later he met ʻAbdu'l-Bahá during his journeys to the West in 1912. Initially Fujita was living in Cleveland working for a Doctor Barton-Peek, a female Baháʼí, but failed to meet ʻAbdu'l-Bahá as he came through. Later on ʻAbdu'l-Bahá's next trip west Fujita caught up with him when he reached Chicago at the home of Corinne True and from there traveled with ʻAbdu'l-Bahá to the west coast and back. During the trip there was an incident similar to the well known one of Louis George Gregory in that at a dinner a place at the table was not set for Fujita and ʻAbdu'l-Baha asked for a place be set.

Fujita was separated from ʻAbdu'l-Bahá when he left the United States until 1919 when ʻAbdu'l-Bahá offered an invitation for him to serve the interests of the religion in Haifa at the Baháʼí World Centre. During his lifetime two tablets were addressed to Fujita specifically by ʻAbdu'l-Bahá. Siegfried Schopflocher, who would later be appointed a Hand of the Cause, converted to the Baháʼí Faith during a meeting with Fujita in 1921 shortly after the death of ʻAbdu'l-Bahá.

From his arrival in Haifa, Fujita would serve the rest of his life there except during the tensions of World War II. At the end of World War II contact was re-established with Fujita after some searching by Michael Jamir and later Fujita was able to return to continue to serve at the Baháʼí World Centre. He attended the first Asian Regional Teaching Conference, held in Nikko, Japan, 1955.

Until his death in 1976 he continued to serve in Haifa.

He is buried in Haifa.

== See also ==
- Baháʼí Faith in Japan
