= Nasr area =

Governorate of Jordan

Al-Nasr حي النصر
- area
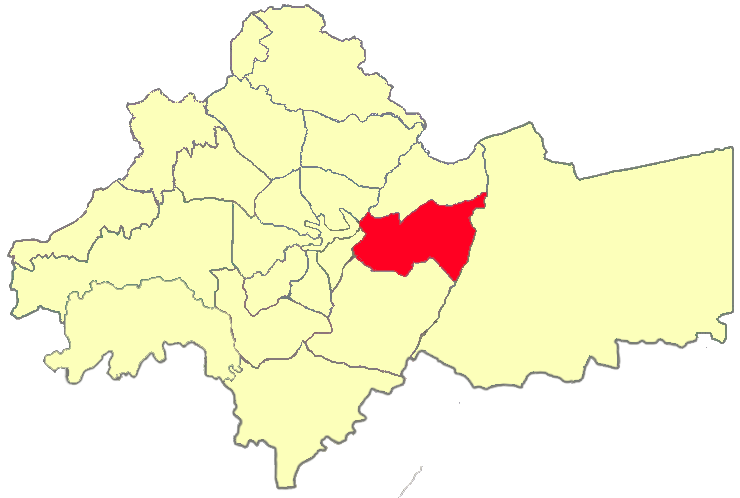
- Country: Jordan
- Governorate: Amman
- Time zone: GMT +2
  - Summer (DST): +3

Al-Nasr is one of the areas of the Greater Amman Municipality, Jordan.
