= Margit Warburg =

Danish sociologist of religion

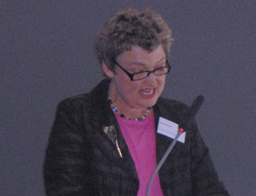
- Born: 15 February 1952 (age 74); Copenhagen, Denmark
- Education: University of Copenhagen
- Occupations: Sociologist, author, professor
- Years active: 1979–present

Margit Warburg (born 15 February 1952) is a Danish sociologist of religion. Since 2004, she has been professor of Sociology of Religion in the Department of Cross-Cultural and Regional Studies at the University of Copenhagen. She was an associate professor at the same university from 1979 to 2004.

== Academic career ==
Margit Warburg received the University of Copenhagen's 1976 gold medal for answering an economic problem in Christian studies. She received her Magister (PhD) degree in sociology of religion from the University of Copenhagen in 1979, and her Dr.Phil. (DLitt) degree in 2007 with a monographic dissertation on the Baháʼí Faith titled Citizens of the World: A History and Sociology of the Baháʼís from a Globalisation Perspective.

Following her Magister's degree, Warburg was employed at the University of Copenhagen as an associate professor. She became professor of Sociology of Religion in the university's Department of Cross-Cultural and Regional Studies in 2004. Her inaugural lecture was entitled Sociology of Religion and the globalization (Danish: Religionssociologien og globaliseringen). She helped create the University of Copenhagen's inter-faculty research project "Religion in the 21st Century" (2003–2007), co-chaired its steering group, and has headed the Department of Religious History.

She has authored, co-authored, and edited books and articles dealing with the study and sociology of religion. With Eileen Barker, she co-edited New Religions and New Religiosity in 1998 (Aarhus University Press). She also did extensive archival work and fieldwork on the Baháʼí religion in Denmark, the U.S., Israel, and Iran. This led in 2003 to publication of Baháʼí (Signature Books).

One focus of Warburg's research is the effect on Danish society and identity of increasing religious diversity. She has written about civil religion, and presented about mixed marriages as a part of the "Religion Report" show on Danmarks Radio Program 1.

Warburg is a member of the Advisory Committee on Religious Denominations which reports to Denmark's Ministry of Ecclesiastical Affairs, and she has co-chaired the Research Network on New Religions (RENNER).

== Selected bibliography ==
- with Hans Raun Iversen; Lisbet Christoffersen; Hanne Petersen (28 June 2013). Religion in the 21st Century: Challenges and Transformations. Farnham, Surrey, United Kingdom: Ashgate Publishing, Ltd. ISBN 978-1-4094-8086-0.
- with Annika Hvithamar; Brian Arly Jacobsen (2009). Holy Nations and Global Identities: Civil Religion, Nationalism, and Globalisation. International Studies in Religion and Society. Vol. 10. Leiden, The Netherlands: BRILL. ISBN 90-04-17828-7.
- with Peter Gundelach; Hans Iversen (2008). I hjertet af Danmark: institutioner og mentaliteter (in Danish). Copenhagen, Denmark: Hans Reitzels Forlag. ISBN 978-87-412-5173-8.
- — (2007). Tørre tal om troen. Forlaget Univers. ISBN 978-87-91668-11-1.
- — (2006). Citizens of the World: A History and Sociology of the Bahaʹis from a Globalisation Perspective. Numen Book Series Studies in the History of Religions. Vol. 106. Leiden, The Netherlands: Brill. ISBN 978-90-04-14373-9.
- — (2006). Religionssociologien og globaliseringen. Chaos. Skandinavisk tidsskrift for religionshistoriske studier (in Danish). Vol. 46. Copenhagen, Denmark: Museum Tusculanum Press. pp. 37–51. ISBN 978-87-635-0574-1.
- with Morten T. Højsgaard (2005). Religion and Cyberspace. London, United Kingdom: Psychology Press. ISBN 978-0-415-35763-0.
- with Annika Hvithamar; Morten Warmind (2005). Baha'i and Globalisation. Renner Studies on New Religions. Vol. 7. Aarhus, Denmark: Aarhus University Press. ISBN 978-87-7934-109-8.
- — (2003). Bahaʼi. Studies in Contemporary Religion. Salt Lake City, Utah: Signature Books. ISBN 978-1-56085-169-1.
- with Jørgen Podemann Sørensen; Mikael Rothstein (1999). Humanistisk religionsforskning: en introduktion till religionshistoria och religionssociologi (in Swedish). Nora, Sweden: Nya Doxa. ISBN 978-91-578-0048-0.
- Barker, Eileen; Warburg, Margit (editors). 1998. New Religions and New Religiosity. Aarhus, Denmark: Aarhus University Press.
- — (1995). Kompendium til undervisning i babisme og baha'i (in Danish). Copenhagen, Denmark: Institut for Religionshistorie, Københavns Universitet.
- — (1991). The Circle, the Brotherhood, and the Ecclesiastical Body: Bahá'í in Denmark, 1925–1987. Aarhus, Denmark: Aarhus University Press.
- — (1990). Brudstykker til en religionssociologisk materialesamling (in Danish). Henrik Morell.
- — (1985). Iranske dokumenter: forfølgelsen af bahá'íerne i Iran (in Danish). Copenhagen, Denmark: Rhodos. ISBN 978-87-7245-029-2.
- with Niels Kastfelt (1981). Kulturmøde i Nigeria: mødet mellem Bachamafolket, engelske koloniembedsmænd og Dansk Forenet Sudan Mission (in Danish). Copenhagen, Denmark: Gad. ISBN 978-87-12-45416-8.
- — (1979). Religionssociologi: grundbog (in Danish). Copenhagen, Denmark: Ide og religion.
- — (1978). Religion i gymnasiet, HF og seminariet: Forholdet mellem retsgrundlaget og undervisningsmaterialernes indhold, holdninger og pædagogiske principper (in Danish). Copenhagen, Denmark: Institut for Religionssociologi, Københavns Universitet. ISBN 978-87-503-2492-8.
