= Khaledah =

Khaledah خالده
- Village
- Location within Iran
- Coordinates: 27°27′19″N 53°06′25″E
- Country: Iran
- Province: Fars
- County: Lamerd
- Bakhsh: Central
- Rural District: Central

Population (2006)
  - Total: 637
- Time zone: UTC+3:30 (IRST)
  - Summer (DST): UTC+4:30 (IRDT)

Khaledah (Persian: خالده, also Romanized as Khaldeh; also known as Khālda) is a village in Lamerd Rural District, Lamerd District, Mohr County, Fars province, Iran. At the 2006 census, its population was 637, in 123 families.
