= David B. Barrett =

Welsh academic & Anglican priest (1927-2011)

David B. Barrett (August 30, 1927, Llandudno – August 4, 2011) was a British visiting professor at Columbia University, an Anglican priest, and research secretary for the Anglican Consultative Council.

Barrett graduated from the University of Cambridge in 1945 with a bachelor's, and in 1952 with a master's in aeronautics. He received a Bachelor of Divinity in 1954 and became a missionary with the Church Missionary Society (Anglican) in 1956–57.

He arrived in Nyanza Province in Western Kenya in 1957. Over the course of 14 years he traveled to 212 of 223 countries and corresponded with Christians all over the world in search of the most up-to-date statistics on Christianity and world religions. His research resulted in the first edition of the World Christian Encyclopedia in 1982. From 1985 until 1993, Barrett was a research consultant for the International Mission Board (then called the Foreign Mission Board) of the Southern Baptist Convention.

== Works ==
- Barrett, David B. “AD 2000: 350 Million Christians in Africa.” International Review of Mission 59, no. 233 (January 1970): 39–54.
- ———. Evangelize! A Historical Survey of the Concept. Global Evangelization Movement: The AD 2000 Series. Birmingham, AL: New Hope, 1987.
- ———. “Interdisciplinary Theories of Religion and African Independency.” In David B. Barrett, ed. African Initiatives in Religion: 21 Studies from Eastern and Central Africa, 146–159. Nairobi: East African Pub. House, 1971.
- ———. “Reaction to Mission: An Analysis of Independent Church Movements Across Two Hundred African Tribes.” Ph.D. diss, Columbia University, 1965.
- ———. Schism and Renewal in Africa: An Analysis of Six Thousand Contemporary Religious Movements. Nairobi: Oxford University Press, 1968.
- ———. “Urban Pressures on Religion and Church: A Study of the Luo of Kenya.” S.T.M. thesis, Union Theological Seminary, 1963.
- Barrett, David B., ed. World Christian Encyclopedia: A Comparative Survey of Churches and Religions in the Modern World, A.D. 1900–2000. Nairobi: Oxford University Press, 1982.
- Barrett, David B., and Todd M. Johnson, eds. World Christian Trends, AD 30–AD 2200: Interpreting the Annual Christian Megacensus. Pasadena, CA: William Carey Library, 2001.
- Barrett, David B., George T. Kurian, and Todd M. Johnson, eds. World Christian Encyclopedia: A Comparative Survey of Churches and Religions in the Modern World. Oxford: Oxford University Press, 2001.
- Barrett, David B., George K. Mambo, Janice McLaughlin, and Malcolm J. McVeigh, eds. Kenya Churches Handbook: The Development of Kenyan Christianity, 1498–1973. Kisumu: Evangel Publishing House, 1973.
