= World Christian Encyclopedia =

Reference work on Christianity

- Title page for World Christian Encyclopedia (1982)
- Author: David B. Barrett
- Publisher: Oxford University Press
- Publication date: 1982
- Followed by: World Christian Encyclopedia, 2nd edition

World Christian Encyclopedia is a reference work, with its third edition published by Edinburgh University Press in November 2019. The WCE is known for providing membership statistics for major world religions and Christian denominations including historical data and projections of future populations.

The data incorporated into the World Christian Encyclopedia have been made available online at the World Christian Database (WCD).

== Editions ==
=== First edition (1982) ===
The first edition, World Christian Encyclopedia: A Comparative Survey of Churches and Religions in the Modern World A.D. 1900–2000 (WCE), by David B. Barrett, was published in 1982 by Oxford University Press. Barrett was a trained aeronautical engineer who became a missionary with the Church Missionary Society (Anglican). He arrived in Nyanza Province in Western Kenya in 1957. Over the course of 14 years he traveled to 212 of 223 countries and corresponded with Christians all over the world in search of the most up-to-date statistics on Christianity and world religions. His research resulted in the first edition of the World Christian Encyclopedia in 1982.

=== Second edition (2001) ===
Barrett moved to Richmond, Virginia in 1985 to work with the Southern Baptists on missionary strategy. He continued his research as an independent researcher, joined by Todd M. Johnson in 1988. With George Kurian, Barrett and Johnson produced the second edition of the World Christian Encyclopedia, in 2 volumes, in 2001 (Oxford University Press).

=== Third edition (2019) ===
The third edition, written and edited by Todd M. Johnson and Gina A. Zurlo (Barrett died in 2011), was released in November 2019. Johnson and Zurlo are co-directors of the Center for the Study of Global Christianity at Gordon–Conwell Theological Seminary, an evangelical seminary in Hamilton, Massachusetts.

== Status of Global Christianity estimates ==
The authors of the WCE and WCD at the Center for the Study of Global Christianity at Gordon–Conwell Theological Seminary publish annual estimates of the population of each religious and non-religious group, as well as forecasts for the coming decades. These estimates and forecasts are published in the International Bulletin of Mission Research in the "Status of Global Mission" and later "Status of Global Christianity" reports.

=== Relation to Pew Research Center ===
Since 2008, the Center for the Study of Global Christianity (CSGC) has been a partner of Pew Research Center, which also produces estimates of religious demographics. The CSGC uses a similar methodology as Pew, but uses self-reported data from religious communities in addition to censuses and survey data.

In the Harvard Divinity Bulletin, WCD editor Gina A. Zurlo explained that the WCD estimates differ from those of Pew as a result of higher estimates for Christians in countries such as India and China, who the WCD believes are undercounted in official surveys, and because unlike Pew and many national surveys, the WCD does not have categories for "none" or "nothing in particular".

Estimates of the Christian population
Year	WCD (2010)	WCD (2015)	Pew (2015)	WCD (2025)	Pew (2025)
2000	▲2.00 billion	▲1.99 billion^{†}		▲1.99 billion	
2010	▲2.29 billion^{†}		▲2.17 billion^{†}		▲2.15 billion
2020			▲2.38 billion	▲2.53 billion^{†}	▲2.27 billion^{†}
2050		▲3.44 billion	▲2.92 billion	▲3.31 billion	

^{†} Indicates the latest estimate as of publication. Italics indicates a forecast. Blank indicates no estimate/forecast provided.

=== Forecasts of the global irreligious population ===
As of 2025, the WCD estimates that the global irreligious population (atheists and agnostics) increased from 3.26 million in 1900 to 708 million in 1970, to 783 million in 2000, and to 907 million in 2025.

In 2001, the WCD predicted that the irreligious population would increase from an estimated 871 million in 2000 to 1.04 billion in 2025. The WCD's 2010 prediction was a decline from 803 million in 2000 to 759 million in 2025. The 2015 prediction was an increase to 834 million, and the 2020 prediction an increase to 867 million. In 2025 itself, the WCD estimated that the irreligious population had increased from 783 million in 2000 to 907 million in 2025.

In 2025, the WCD predicted the irreligious population would decline to 867 million in 2050, and in 2026 predicted that it would decline to 716 million in 2075, without providing a forecast for 2050.

In 2015, Pew Research Center predicted that the religiously unaffiliated population would increase from 1.13 billion in 2010 to 1.19 billion in 2020 and 1.23 billion in 2050. In 2025, Pew estimated that the unaffiliated population had increased from 1.64 billion in 2010 to 1.91 billion in 2020, growing mostly in Europe and North and South America.

Estimates of the irreligious (WCD) or unaffiliated (Pew) population
Year	WCD (2010)	Pew (2015)	WCD (2025)	Pew (2025)	WCD (2026)
1970	▲708 million		▲708 million		▲709 million
2000	▲803 million		▲783 million		▲786 million
2010	▼783 million^{†}	1.13 billion^{†}		1.64 billion	
2020		▲1.19 billion	▲898 million	▲1.91 billion^{†}	▲905 million
2025	▼759 million		▲907 million^{†}		▲912 million^{†} (2026)
2050		▲1.23 billion	▼867 million		
2075					▼716 million

^{†} Indicates the latest estimate as of publication. Italics indicates a forecast. Blank indicates no estimate/forecast provided.

== Reception ==
As the World Christian Encyclopedia was originally developed as a Christian missionary tool, concern has been raised about possible bias.

A 2008 study found that the WCD's data was "highly correlated with other sources that offer cross-national religious composition estimates" but the database "consistently gives a higher estimate for percent Christian in comparison to other cross-national data sets". It also stated: "Most notably, the nonreligious data are not highly correlated between most of the data sets." The study noted:

Some have argued that projections of religious composition for years such as 2025 and 2050 should not be included with the empirical data, as they are merely conjecture (McClymond 2002). Irvin (2005) argues against making predictions about the future of worldwide religion based on recent statistics because Christian growth in Asia and Africa will not necessarily continue along the trajectory it has in past decades.

Peer-reviewed work in the academic journal Review of Religious Research expressed mixed views, both saying the World Christian Encyclopedia's editors "provide reasonable methodological reflections" while also identifying the uncritical acceptance of religious groups' membership claims as a weakness. Another review in the same journal, the Review of Religious Research, described the World Christian Encyclopedia as basing its information on "a direct analysis of primary organizational data," but again noted that a weakness is in relying on how religious groups define their own membership.

In 1983, Rodney Stark, publishing in the journal Sociological Analysis, determined that the 1983 edition's "data are probably reasonably accurate..."

Margit Warburg, a Danish researcher, has argued that the database contains numerical inaccuracies in its statistics on the Baháʼí Faith. She noted that figures given in WCE for some Western countries are highly exaggerated. For instance, the World Christian Encyclopedia reports an estimated 1,600 Baháʼís in Denmark in 1995 and 682,000 Baháʼís in the US in 1995. According to her, the Baháʼís themselves do not acknowledge such numbers; the number of registered Baháʼís in Denmark, in 1995, was about 240 and in the number in the US was about 130,000. Regarding another faith group, the Anglican Communion, David Goodhew, a researcher and fellow of St. John's College, Durham University, argued that the encyclopedia and WCD "give the best data on the current size of the Communion."
