= Religion in Japan =

Religion in Japan by self-identified affiliation (Pew Research Center 2023)
Note: Shinto is not listed separately, as few respondents explicitly identify as Shinto. Practices may be included under "Others" or "No religion."
1. Buddhism (46.0%)
2. No religion (42.0%)
3. Christianity (2.00%)
4. Others (9.00%)
5. Don't know / no response (1.00%)
Religious affiliation among persons claiming one (The World Factbook 2021 estimate)
Note: Shinto is listed separately here, reflecting shrine membership and cultural participation, even if not claimed as a personal identity.
1. Shintoism (48.6%)
2. Buddhism (46.2%)
3. Christianity (1.10%)
4. Others (4.00%)

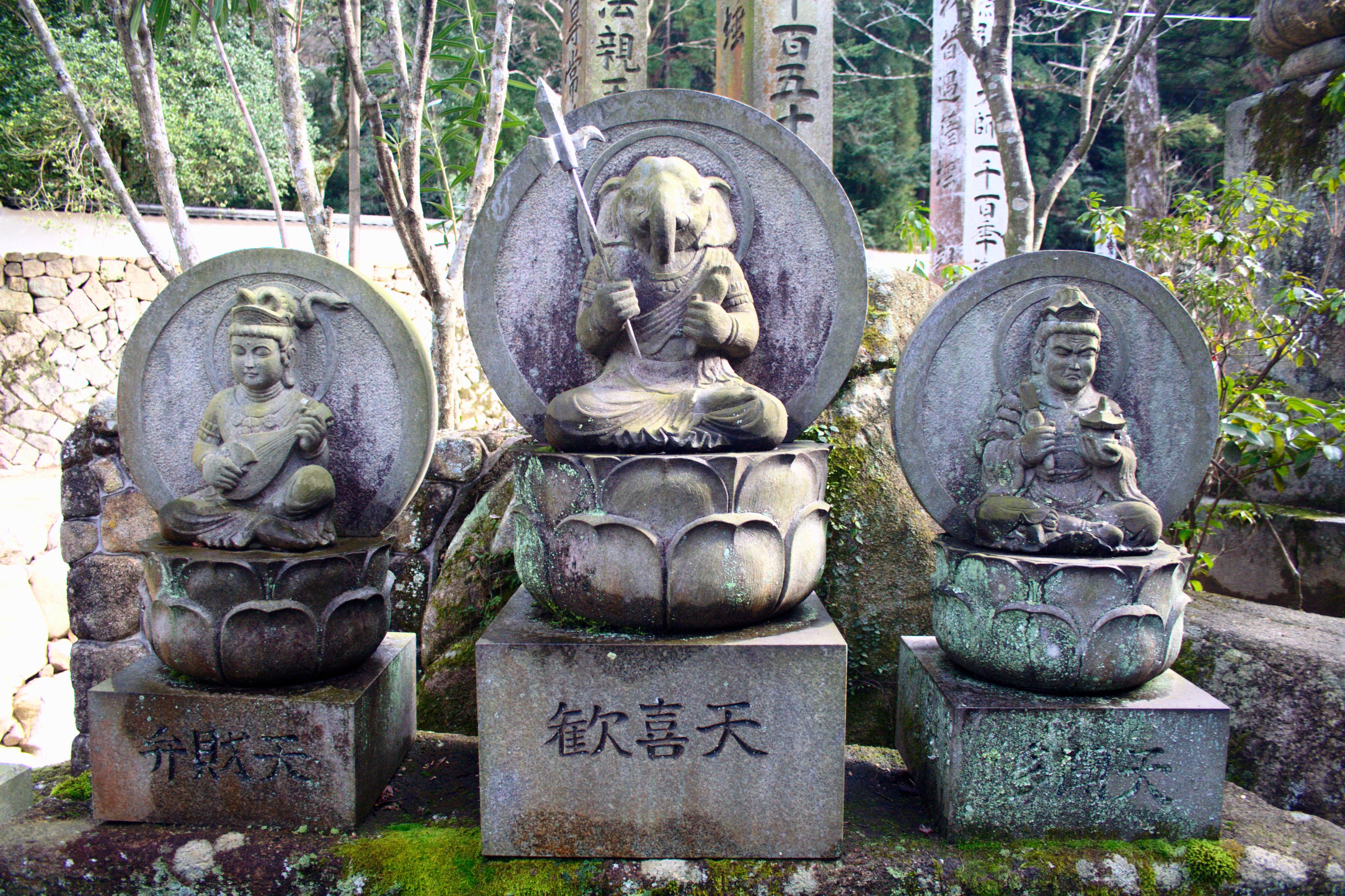
From left to right: idols of Benzaiten (Saraswati), Kangiten (Ganesha) and Bishamonten (Kubera) in the Buddhist Daishō-in temple in Hatsukaichi

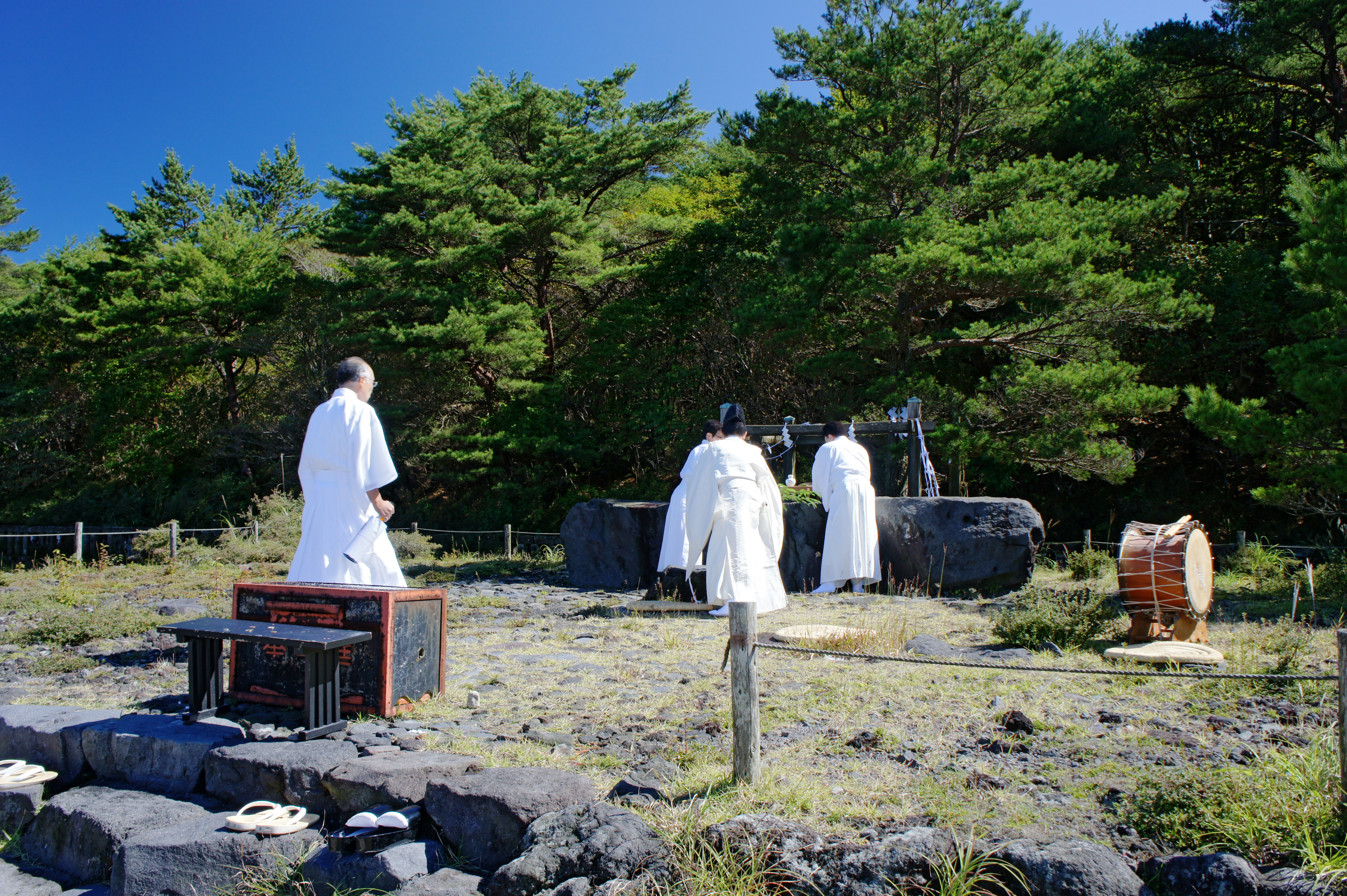
A ritual at the Takachiho-gawara, the sacred Shinto site of the descent to earth of Ninigi-no-Mikoto, the grandson of goddess Amaterasu.

Shinto and Buddhism, being practiced simultaneously, are two main religions in Japan. Syncretic combinations of both, known generally as shinbutsu-shūgō, are common; they represented Japan's dominant religion before the rise of State Shinto in the 19th century.

The Japanese concept of religion differs significantly from that of Western culture. Spirituality and worship are highly eclectic; rites and practices, often associated with well-being and worldly benefits, are of primary concern, while doctrines and beliefs garner minor attention. Religious affiliation is an alien notion. Although the vast majority of Japanese citizens follow Shinto, only some 3% identify as Shinto in surveys, because the term is understood to imply membership of organized Shinto sects. Some identify as "without religion" (無宗教, mushūkyō), yet this does not signify rejection or apathy towards faith. The mushūkyō is a specified identity, which is used mostly to affirm regular, "normal" religiosity while rejecting affiliation with distinct movements perceived as foreign or extreme.

== Main religions ==
=== Shinto ===
Shinto (神道, Shintō), also kami-no-michi, (Note: Both mean the "way of the divine" or "of the gods". Other names are: Kannagara-no-michi, "way of the divine transmitted from time immemorial"; Kodo, the "ancient way"; Daido, the "great way"; Teido, the "imperial way".) is the indigenous religion of Japan and of most of the people of Japan. George Williams classifies Shinto as an action-centered religion; it focuses on ritual practices to be carried out diligently in order to establish a connection between present-day Japan and its ancient roots. The written historical records of the Kojiki and Nihon Shoki first recorded and codified Shinto practices in the 8th century. Still, these earliest Japanese writings do not refer to a unified "Shinto religion", but rather to a collection of native beliefs and of mythology.

Shinto in the 21st century is the religion of public shrines devoted to the worship of a multitude of gods (kami), suited to purposes such as war memorials and harvest festivals, and applies as well to various sectarian organizations. Practitioners express their diverse beliefs through a standard language and practice, adopting a similar style in dress and ritual dating from around the time of the Nara (710–794) and Heian (794–1185) periods.

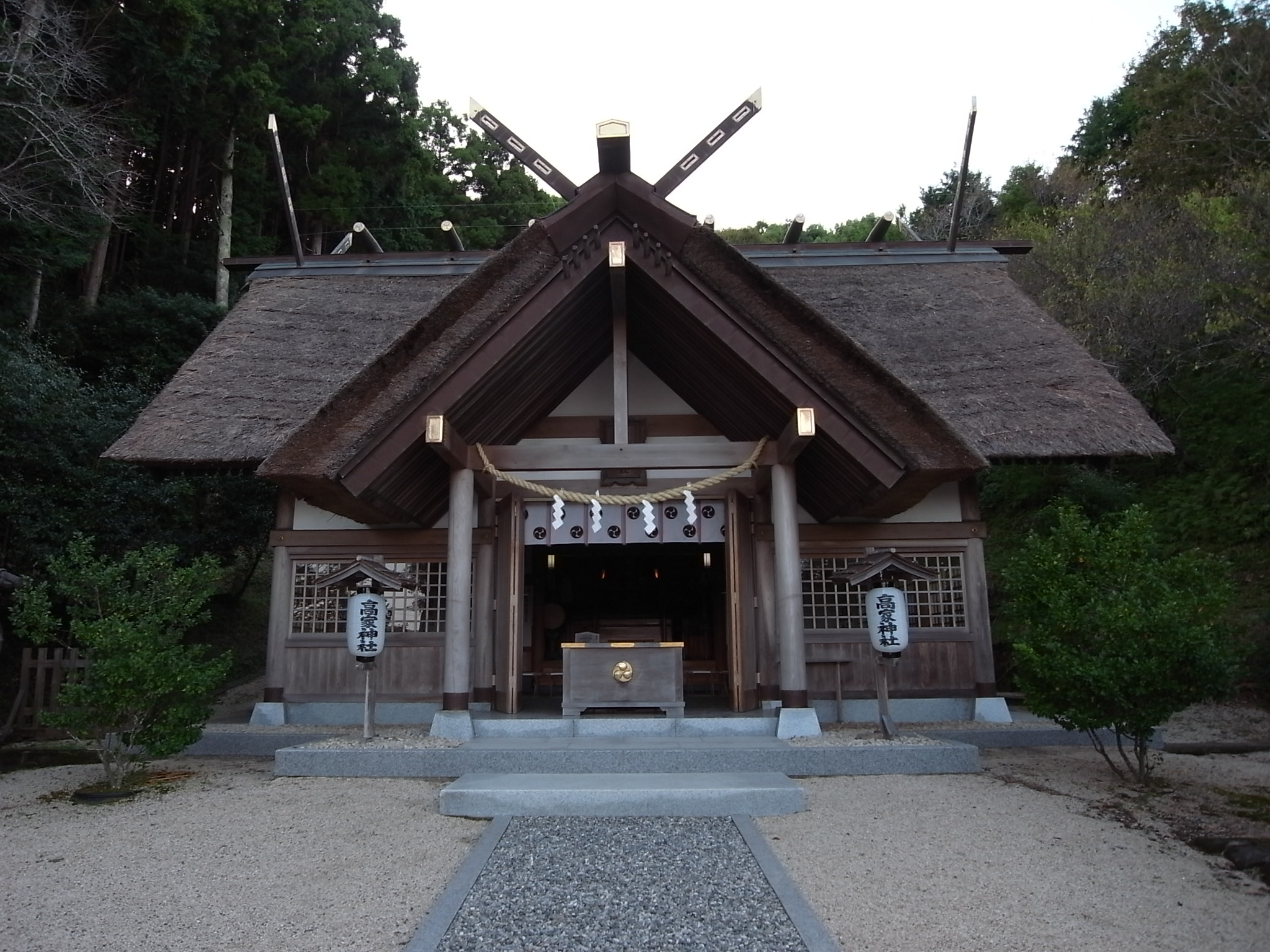
Takabe-jinja in Minamibōsō, Chiba, an example of the native shinmei-zukuri style

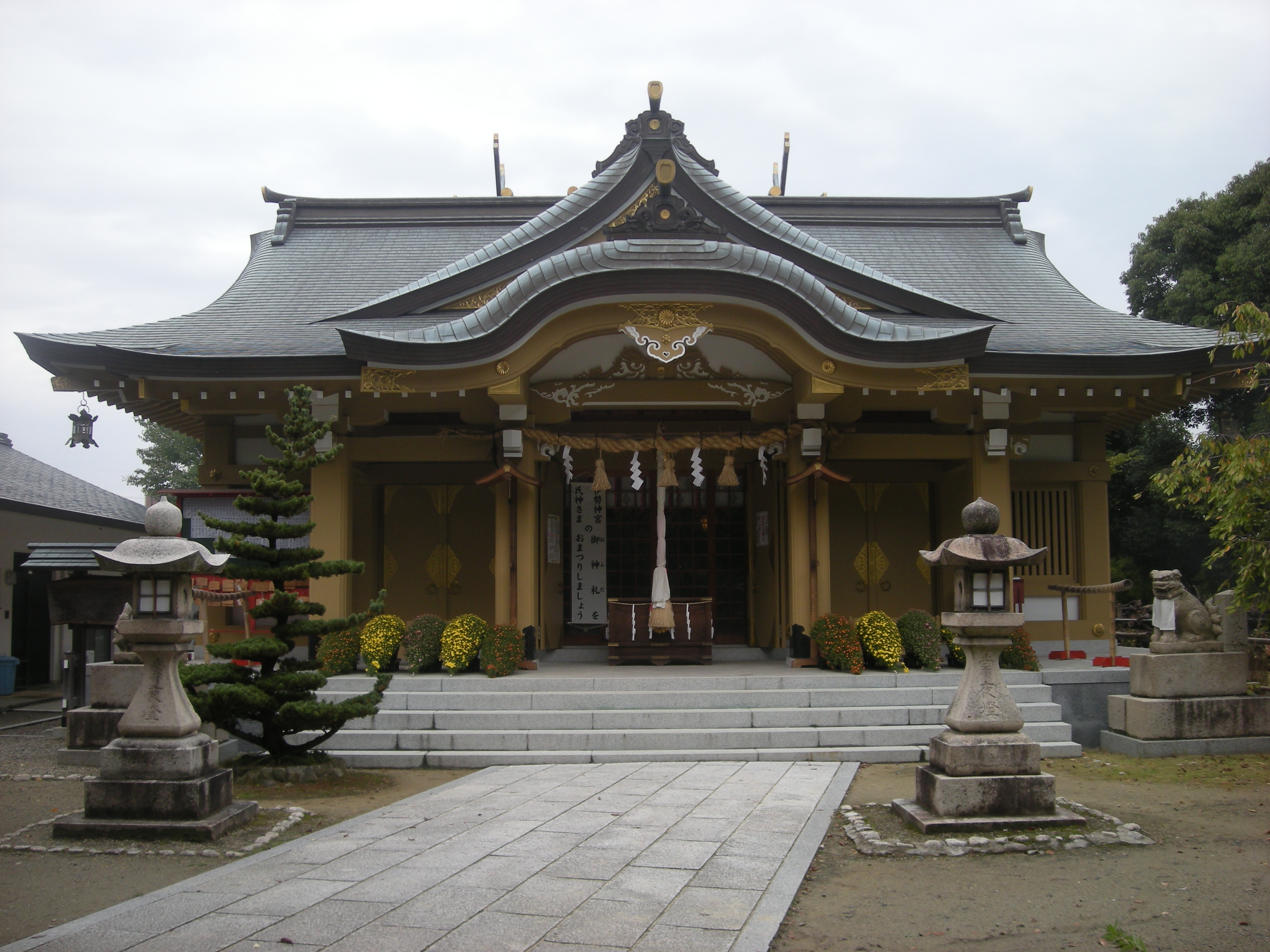
Haiden of the Izanagi-jinja in Suita, Osaka

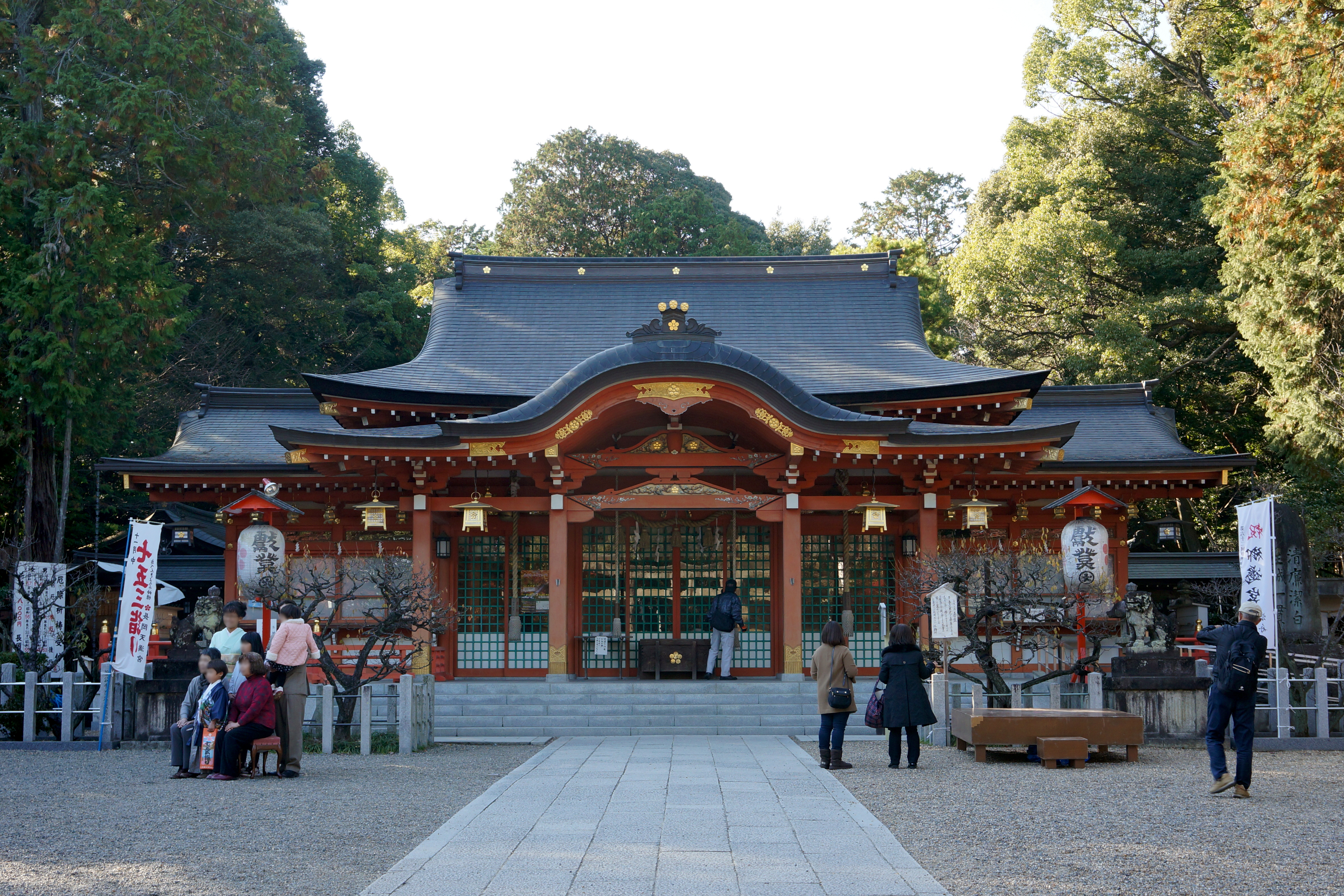
Tenman-gū in Nagaokakyō, Kyoto

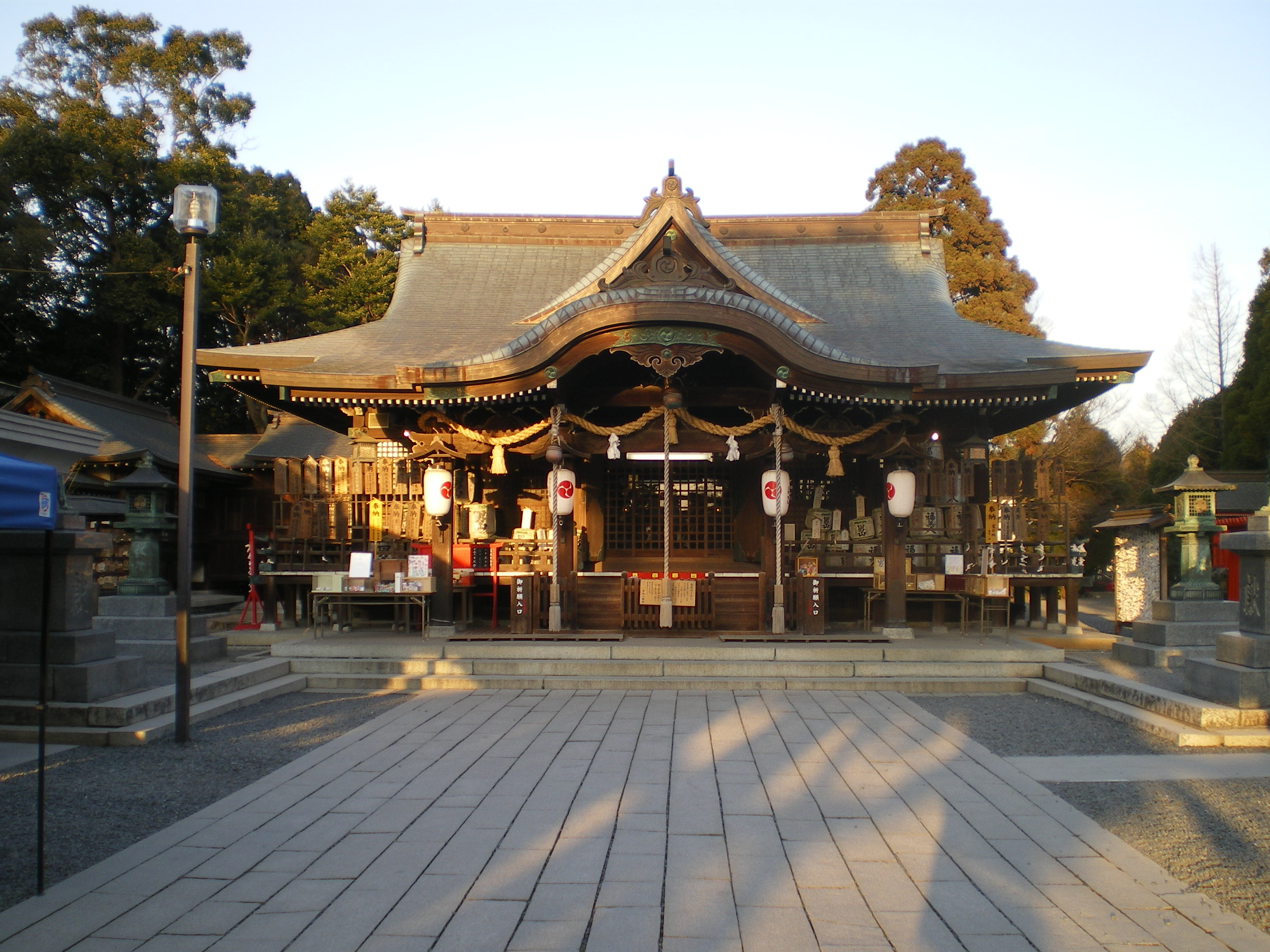
Shrine of Hachiman in Ube, Yamaguchi

The Japanese adopted the word Shinto ("way of the gods"), originally as Shindo, from the written Chinese Shendao (Chinese: 神道; pinyin: shén dào), (Note: During the history of China, at the time of the spread of Buddhism to that country c. 1st century CE, the name Shendao identified what is currently known as "Shenism", the Chinese indigenous religion, distinguishing it from the new Buddhist religion. (Brian Bocking. A Popular Dictionary of Shinto. Routledge, 2005. ASIN: B00ID5TQZY p. 129)) combining two kanji: shin (神), meaning "spirit" or kami; and tō (道), meaning a philosophical path or study (from the Chinese word dào). The oldest recorded usage of the word Shindo dates from the second half of the 6th century. Kami are defined in English as "spirits", "essences" or "gods", referring to the energy generating the phenomena.

Since the Japanese language does not distinguish between singular and plural, kami refers to the divinity, or sacred essence, that manifests in multiple forms: rocks, trees, rivers, animals, places, and even people can be said to possess the nature of kami. Kami and people are not separate; they exist within the same world and share its interrelated complexity.

Shinto is the largest religion in Japan, practiced by nearly 80% of the population, yet only a small percentage of these identify themselves as "Shintoists" in surveys. This is due to the fact that "Shinto" has different meanings in Japan: most of the Japanese attend Shinto shrines and beseech kami without belonging to Shinto organisations. Since there are no formal rituals to become a member of folk "Shinto", "Shinto membership" is often estimated by counting those who join organised Shinto sects. Shinto has 100,000 shrines and 78,890 priests in Japan.

==== Shinto sects ====
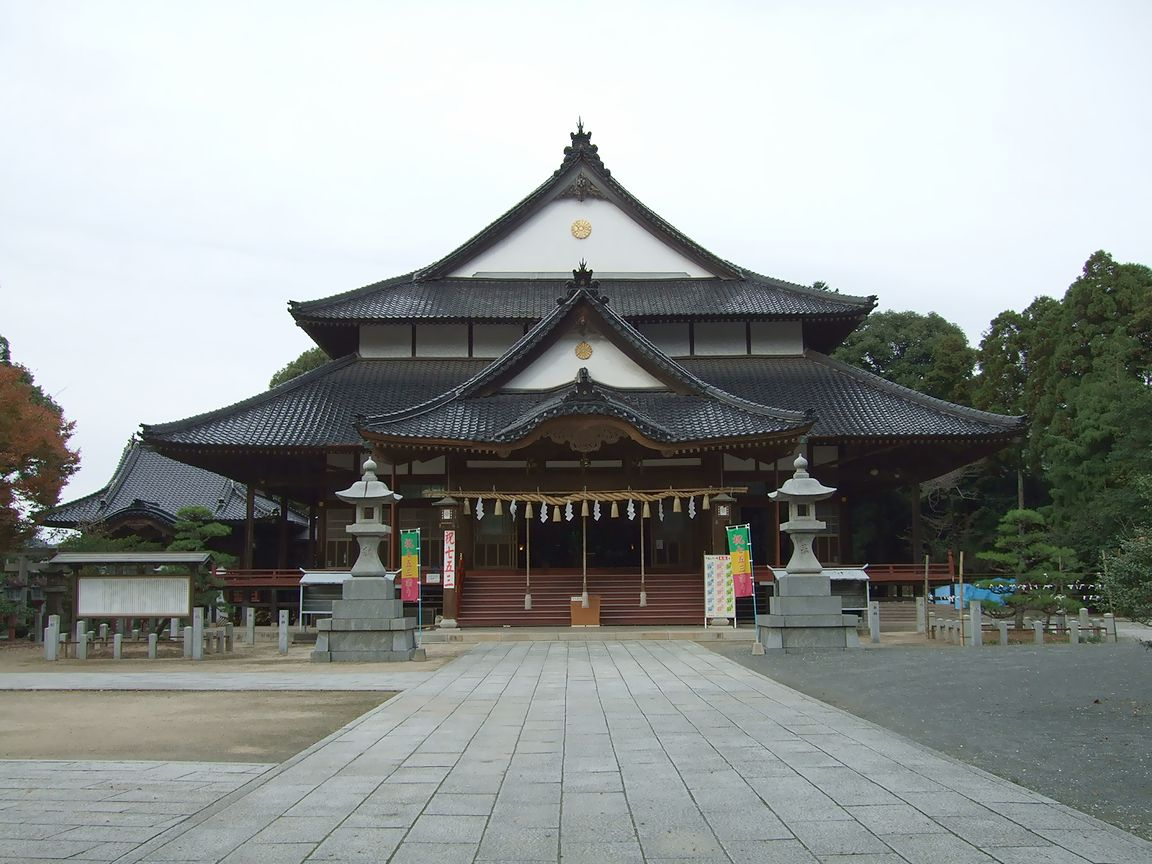
The main shrine of Shinriism (神理教, Shinrikyō) in Kitakyushu, Fukuoka Prefecture

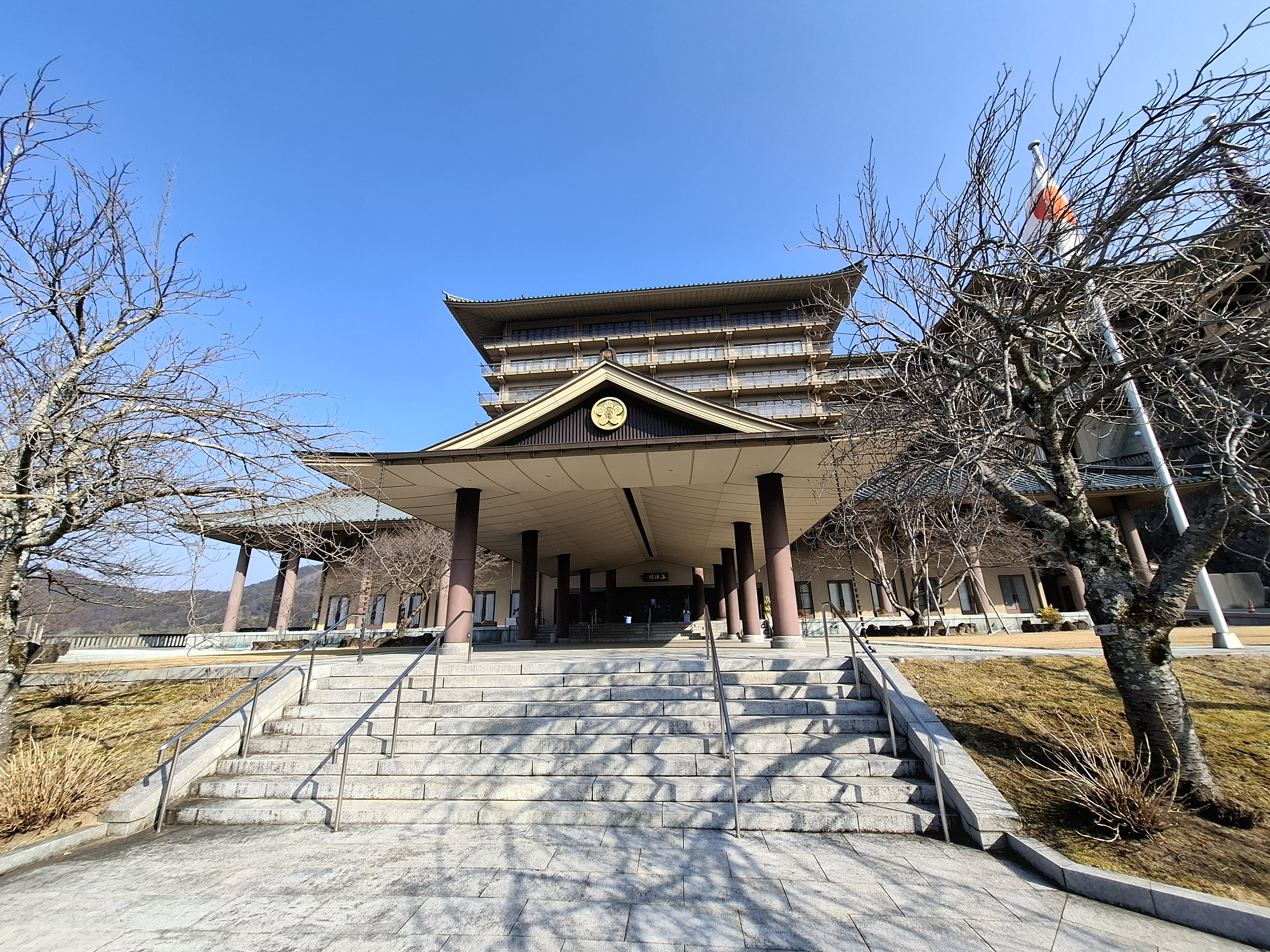
The headquarters of Ennokyo (円応教, En'nōkyō) in Tamba, Hyōgo Prefecture

Profound changes occurred in Japanese society in the 20th century, especially after World War II, including rapid industrialisation and urbanisation. Traditional religions, challenged by the transformation, underwent a reshaping themselves, and principles of religious freedom articulated by the 1947 constitution provided space for the proliferation of new religious movements.

New sects of Shinto, as well as movements claiming a thoroughly independent status, and also new forms of Buddhist lay societies, provided ways of aggregation for people uprooted from traditional families and village institutions. While traditional Shinto has a residential and hereditary basis, and a person participates in the worship activities devoted to the local tutelary deity or ancestor – occasionally asking for specific healing or blessing services or participating in pilgrimages – in the new religions individuals formed groups without regard to kinship or territorial origins, and such groups required a voluntary decision to join. These new religions also provided cohesion through a unified doctrine and practice shared by the nationwide community.

The officially recognized new religions number in the hundreds, and total membership reportedly numbers in the tens of millions. The largest new religion, Soka Gakkai, a Buddhist sect founded in 1930, gathers around 4 million members. Scholars in Japan have estimated that between 10% and 20% of the population belongs to the new religions, although more realistic estimates put the number at well below the 10% mark. In 2007, there were 223,831 priests and leaders of the new religions in Japan, three times the number of traditional Shinto priests.

Many of these new religions derive from Shinto, retain the fundamental characters of Shinto, and often identify themselves as forms of Shinto. These include Tenrikyo, Konkokyo, Omotokyo, Shinrikyo, Shinreikyo, Sekai Shindokyo, Zenrinkyo and others.

=== Buddhism ===
Buddhism (仏教, Bukkyō) first arrived in Japan in the 6th century, introduced in the year 538 or 552 from the kingdom of Baekje in Korea. The Baekje king sent the Japanese emperor a picture of the Buddha and some sutras. After overcoming brief yet violent oppositions by conservative forces, it was accepted by the Japanese court in 587. The Yamato state ruled over clans (uji) centered around the worship of ancestral nature deities. It was a period of intense immigration from Korea, horse riders from northeast Asia, and cultural influence from China, which had been unified under the Sui dynasty becoming the crucial power on the mainland.

Buddhism functioned to affirm the state's power and mold its position in the broader culture of East Asia. Japanese aristocrats set about building Buddhist temples in the capital at Nara. However, the government's vast investment in spreading Buddhism during the Nara period (646–794) led to corruption, and led to a reformation period and a shift in focus from Nara to the new capital of Heian, now Kyoto.

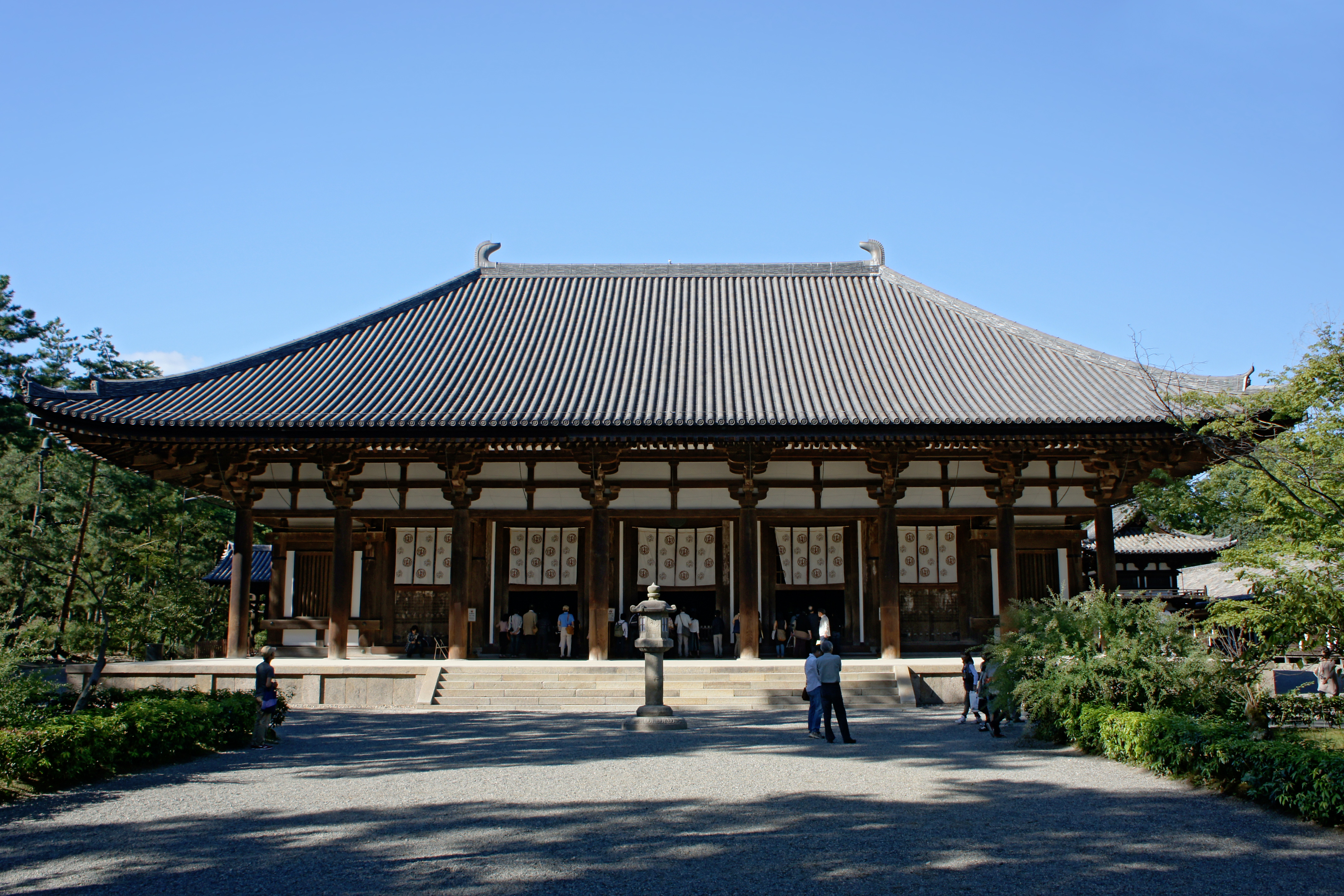
Tōshōdai-ji, an early Buddhist temple in Nara

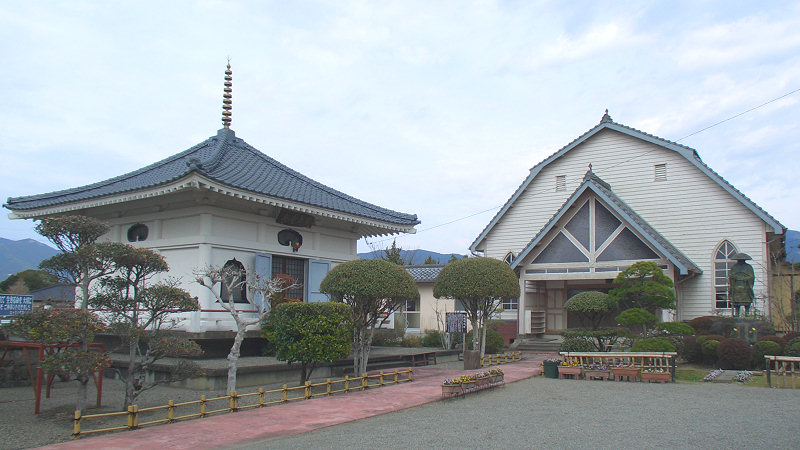
Myoudou-ji, a Jodo Shin temple with distinctive architectural style

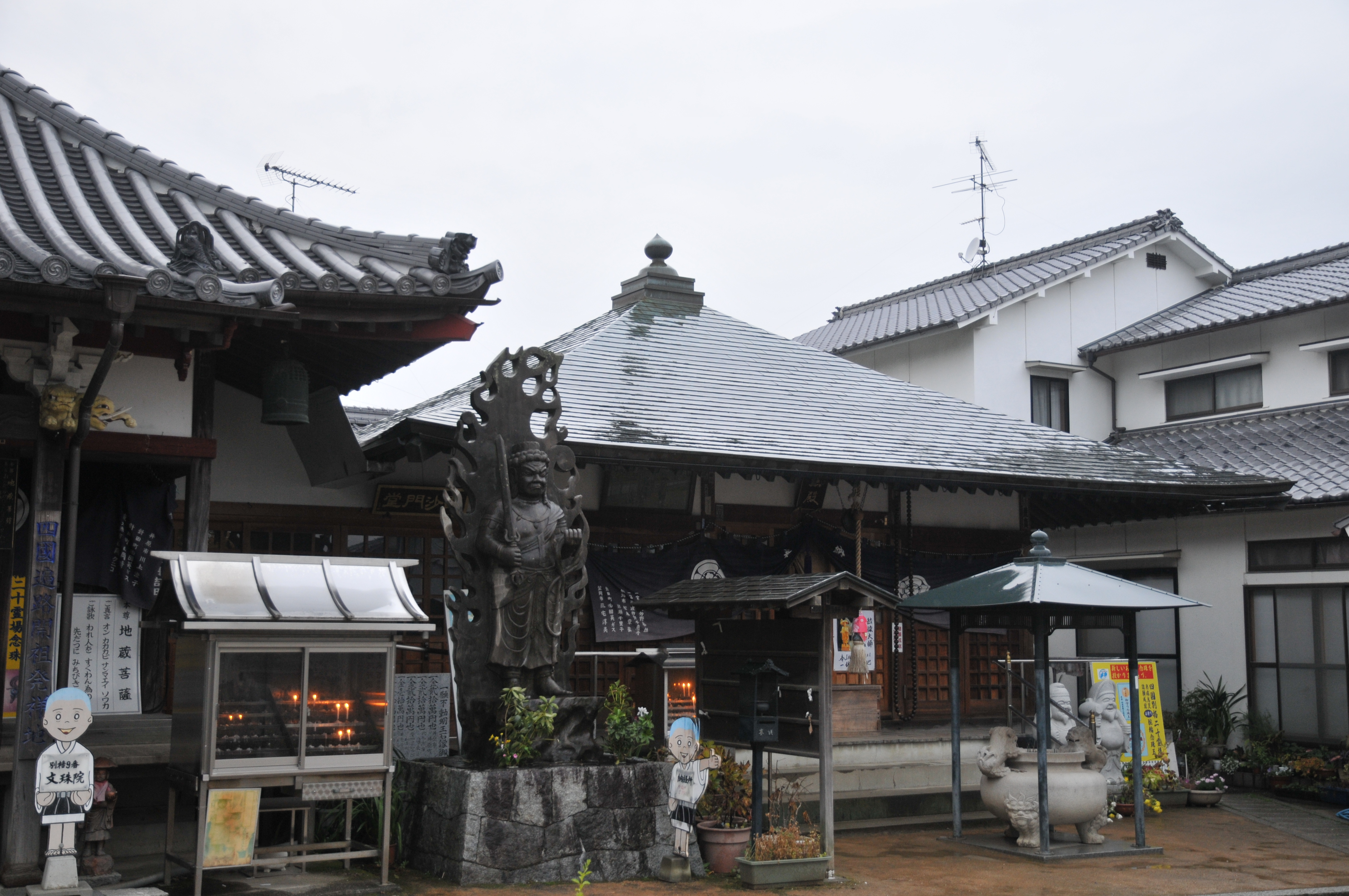
Monju-in, a Shingon temple in Matsuyama, Ehime

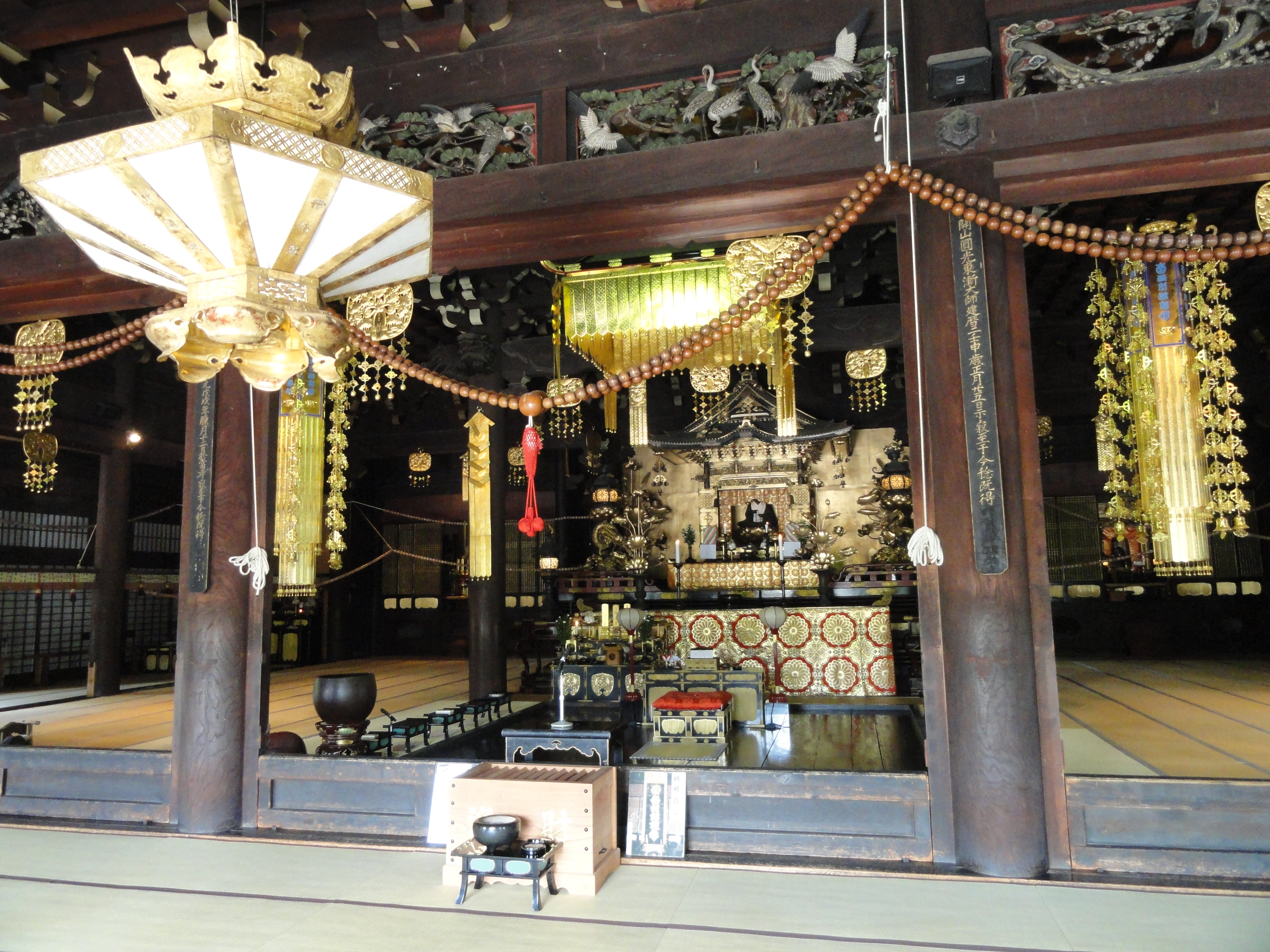
The inner hall of Hyakumanben chion-ji a Jodo temple in Kyoto

The six Buddhist sects initially established in Nara are today together known as "Nara Buddhism" and are relatively small. When the capital moved to Heian, more forms of Buddhism arrived from China, including the still-popular Shingon Buddhism, an esoteric form of Buddhism similar to Tibet's Vajrayana Buddhism, and Tendai, a monastic conservative form known better by its Chinese name, Tiantai.

When the shogunate took power in the 12th century and the administrative capital moved to Kamakura, more forms of Buddhism arrived. The most culturally influential was Zen, which focused on meditation and attaining enlightenment in this life. Two schools of Zen were established, Rinzai and Sōtō. A third, Ōbaku, formed in 1661.

With the Meiji Restoration in 1868 and its accompanying centralisation of imperial power and modernisation of the state, Shinto was made the state religion. An order of elimination of mutual influence of Shinto and Buddhism was also enacted, followed by a movement to thoroughly eradicate Buddhism from Japan.

Today, the most popular school in Japan is Pure Land Buddhism, which arrived in the form of independent schools in the Kamakura period, although elements of it were practiced in Japan for centuries beforehand. It emphasizes the role of Amitabha Buddha and promises that reciting the phrase "Namu Amida Butsu" will result in being taken by Amitabha upon death to the "Western Paradise" or "Pure Land", where Buddhahood is more easily attained. Pure Land attracted members from all of the different classes, from farmers and merchants to noblemen and samurai clans, such as the Tokugawa clan.

There are two primary branches of Pure Land Buddhism today: Jōdo-shū, which focuses on repeating the phrase many times as taught by Honen, and Jōdo Shinshū, which claims that only saying the phrase once with a pure heart is necessary, as taught by Shinran. Two smaller schools of Pure Land Buddhism exist, Ji-shu and Yuzu Nembutsu, although these are significantly smaller than their larger counterparts.

Another prevalent form of Buddhism is Nichiren Buddhism, which was established by the 13th century monk Nichiren who underlined the importance of the Lotus Sutra. The main representatives of Nichiren Buddhism include sects such as Nichiren Shū and Nichiren Shōshū, and lay organisations like Risshō Kōsei Kai and Soka Gakkai—a denomination whose political wing forms the Komeito, Japan's third largest political party. Common to most lineages of Nichiren Buddhism is the chanting of Namu Myōhō Renge Kyō (or Nam Myoho Renge Kyo) and the Gohonzon inscribed by Nichiren.

As of 2018, there were 355,000+ Buddhist monks, priests and leaders in Japan, an increase of over 40,000 compared to 2000.

=== Japanese new religions ===
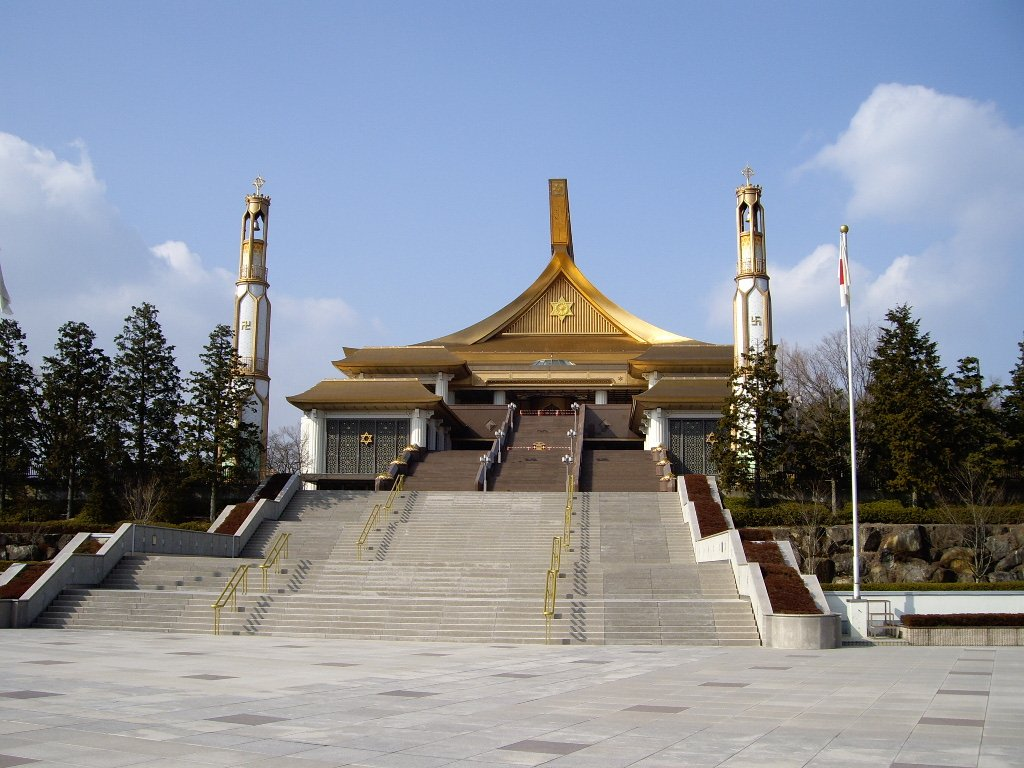
Sukyo Mahikari Headquarter, Takayama, Gifu, Japan.

Others are independent new religions, including Aum Shinrikyo, Mahikari movements, the Church of Perfect Liberty, Seicho-No-Ie, the Church of World Messianity, and others.

== Abrahamic religions ==
=== Christianity ===
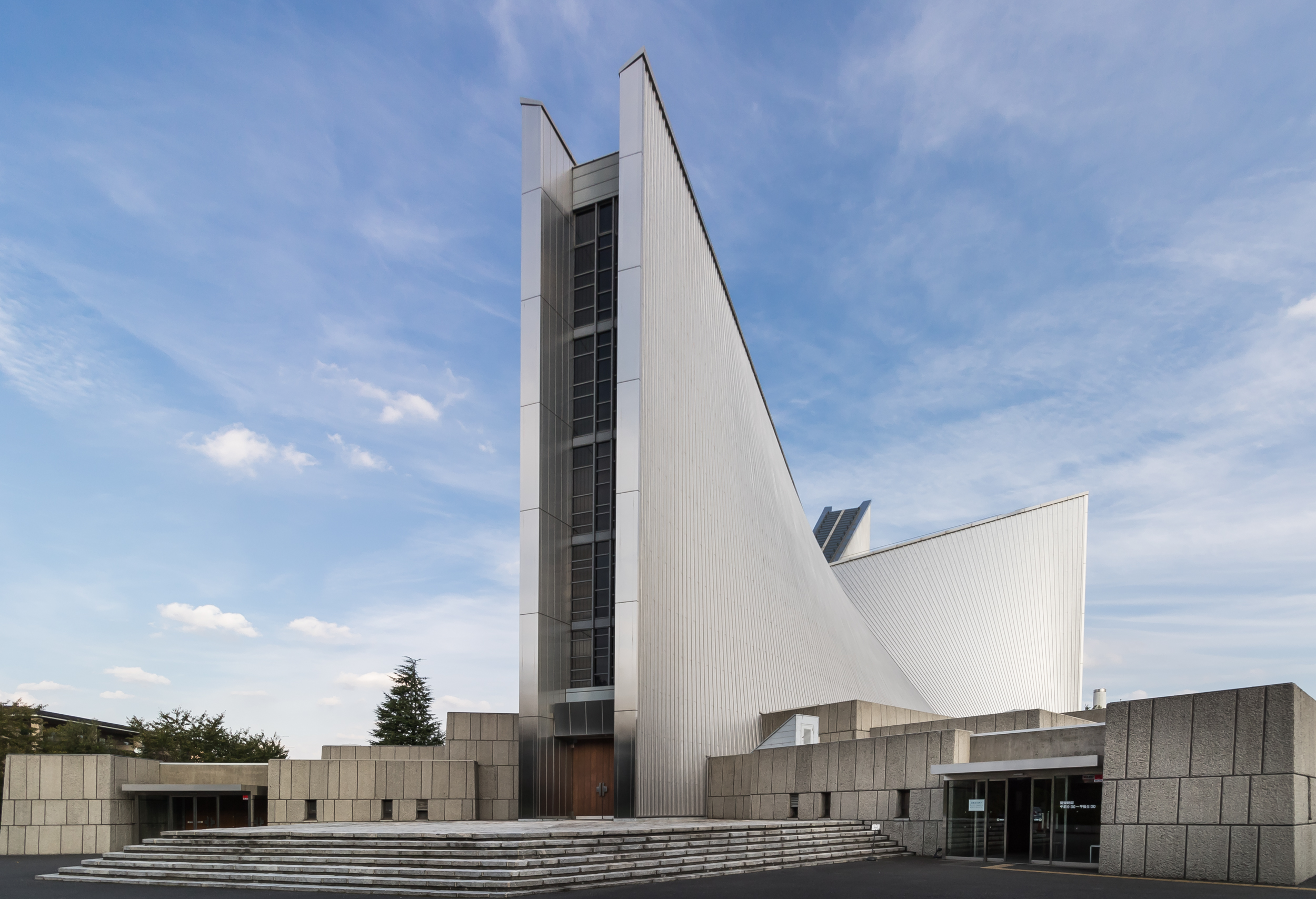
Saint Mary's Catholic Cathedral of Tokyo

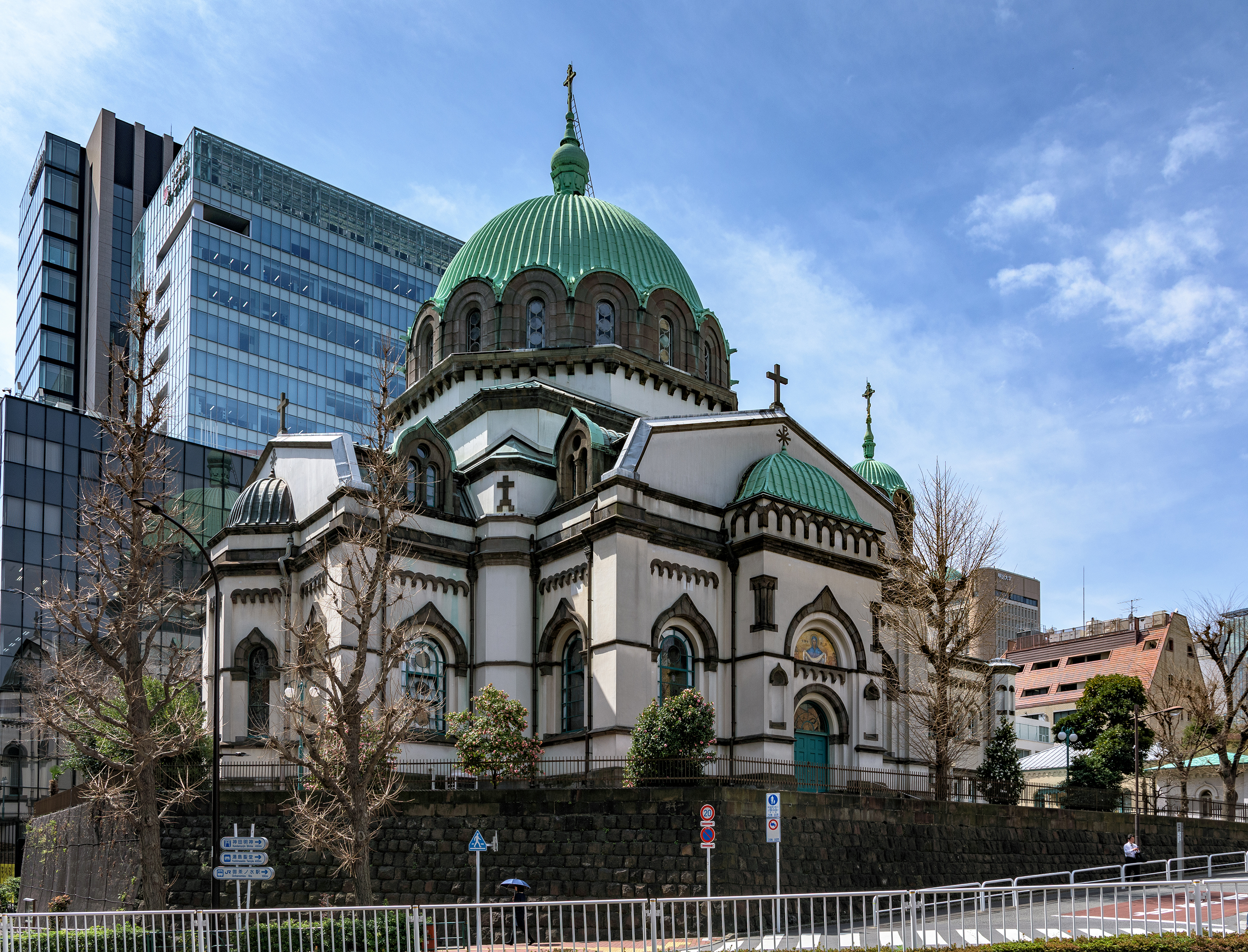
Holy Resurrection Cathedral in Tokyo, of the Japanese Orthodox Church

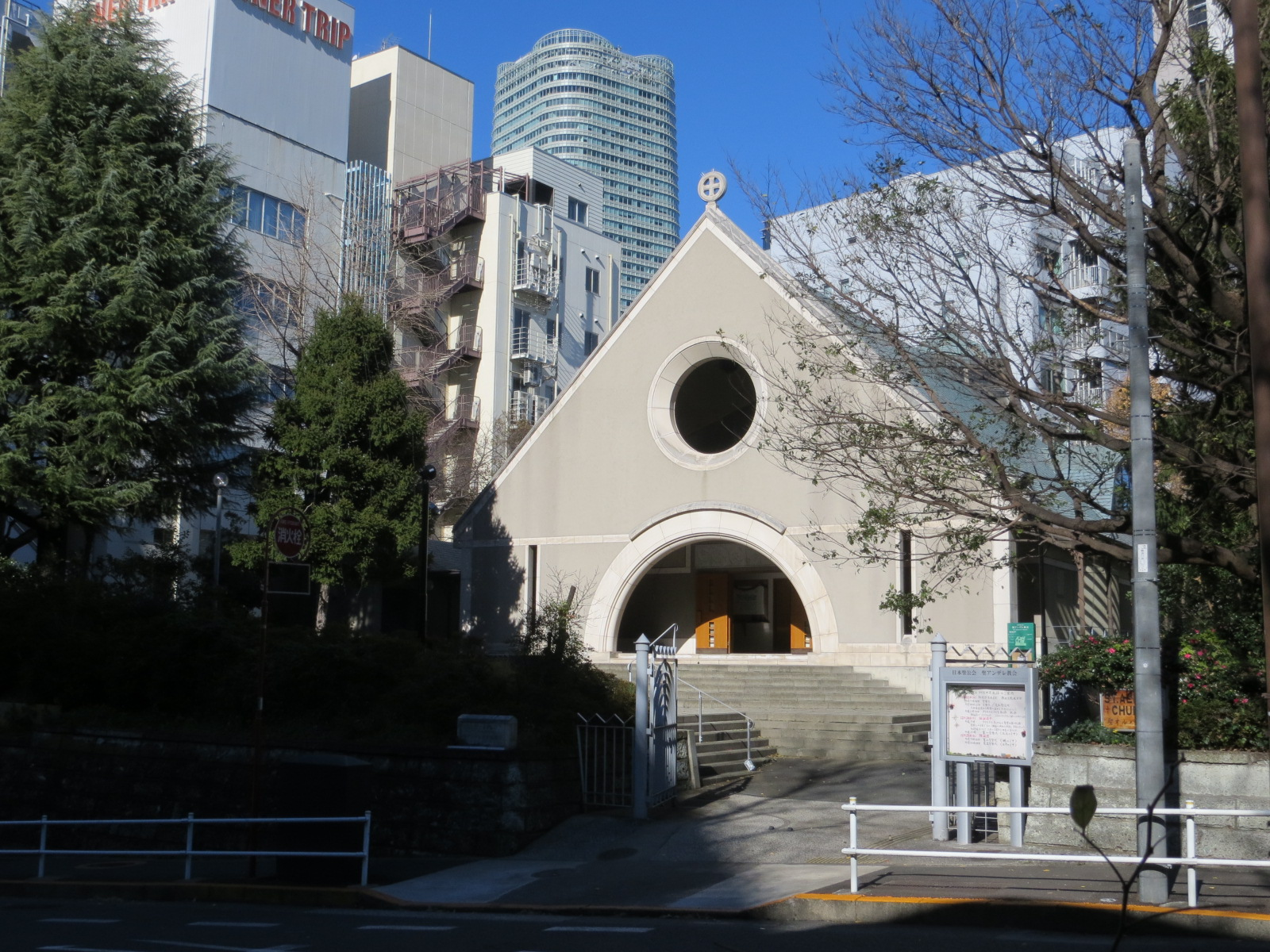
St. Andrew's Cathedral in Tokyo, of the Japanese Anglican Church

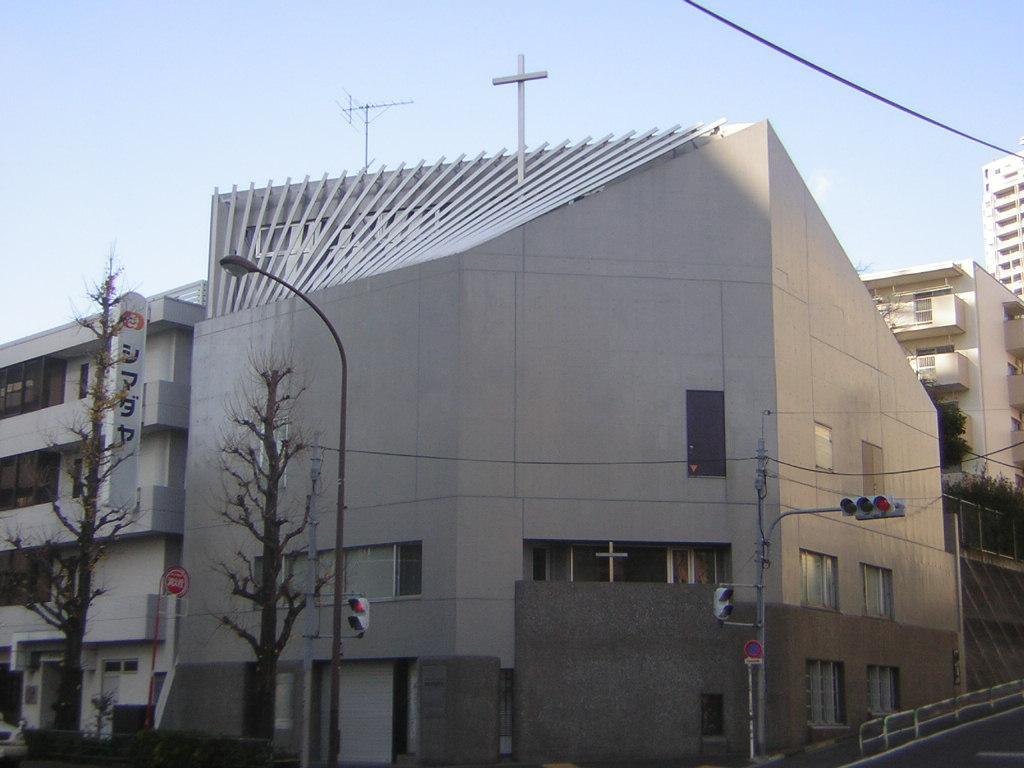
Grace Church, a Reformed church in Tokyo

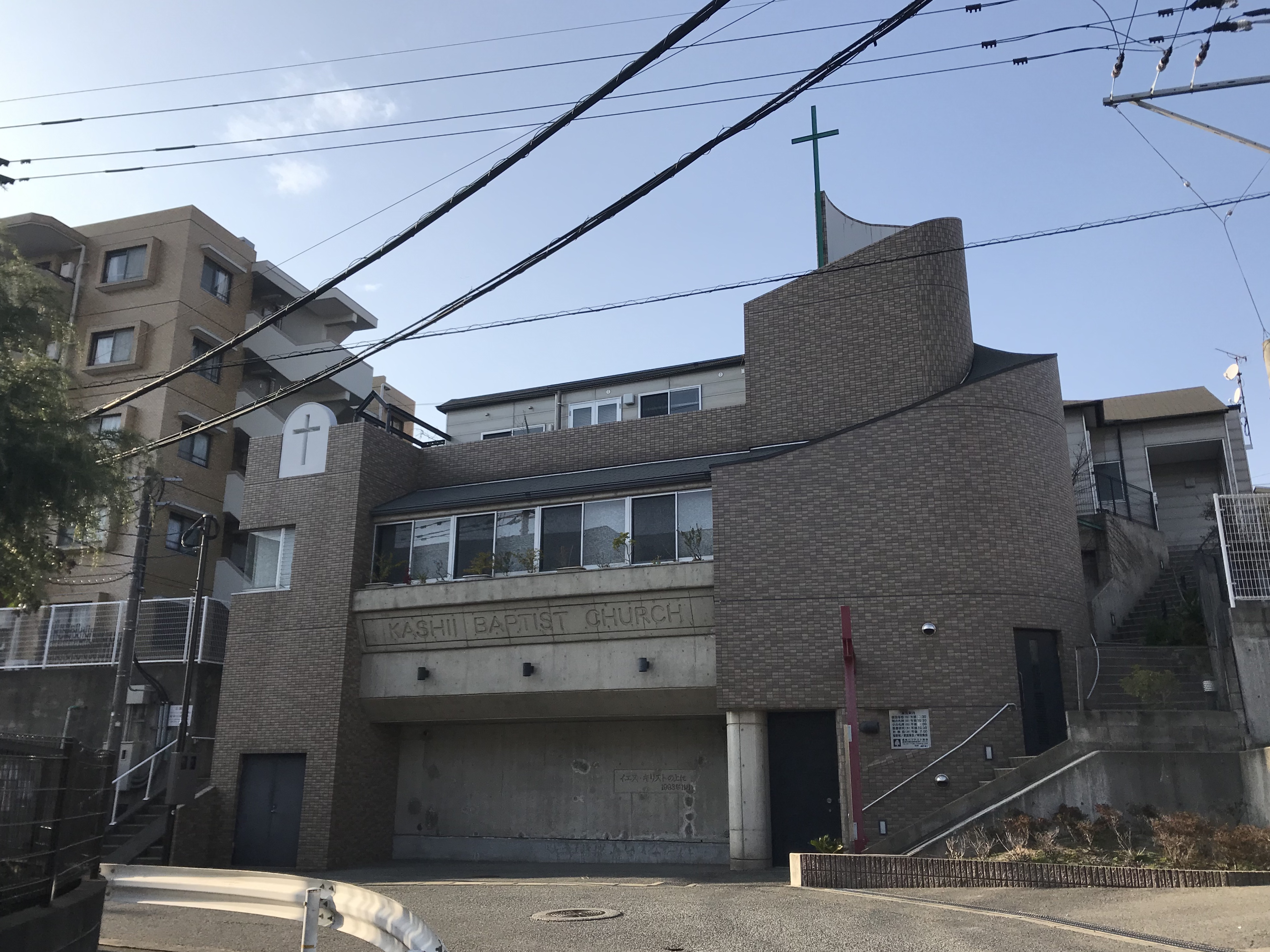
Kashii Baptist Church in Fukuoka (Japan Baptist Convention)

In 2019, there were 1.9 million Christians in Japan, most of them living in the western part of Japan, where missionaries' activities were greatest during the 16th century.

Christianity (キリスト教 Kirisutokyō), in the form of Catholicism (カトリック教 Katorikkukyō), was introduced into Japan by Jesuit missions starting in 1549. In that year, the three Jesuits Francis Xavier, Cosme de Torres and Juan Fernández, landed in Kagoshima, in Kyushu, on 15 August. Portuguese traders were active in Kagoshima since 1543, welcomed by local daimyōs because they imported gunpowder. Anjirō, a Japanese convert, helped the Jesuits understanding of Japanese culture, and translated the first Japanese catechism.

These missionaries were successful in converting large numbers of people in Kyushu, including peasants, former Buddhist monks, and members of the warrior class. In 1559, a mission to the capital, Kyoto, was started. By the following year there were nine churches, and the Christian community grew steadily in the 1560s. In 1569, there were 30,000 Christians and 40 churches. Following the conversion of some lords in Kyushu, mass baptisms of the local populations occurred. In the 1570s, the number of Christians rose rapidly to 100,000.

Near the end of the 16th century, Franciscan missionaries arrived in Kyoto, despite a ban issued by Toyotomi Hideyoshi. In 1597, Hideyoshi proclaimed a more serious edict and executed 26 Franciscans in Nagasaki as a warning. Tokugawa Ieyasu and his successors enforced the prohibition of Christianity with several further edicts, especially after the Shimabara Rebellion in the 1630s. Many Christians continued to practice in secret.

The discourses on Christianity became the property of the state during the Tokugawa period. The state leveraged its power over to declare Christians enemies of the state, in order to create and maintain a legally enforceable identity for Japanese subjects. As such, Christian identities or icons became the exclusive property of the Japanese state. Although often discussed as a "foreign" or "minority" religion, Christianity has played a key sociopolitical role in the lives of Japanese subjects and citizens for hundreds of years.</ref>

In 1873, following the Meiji Restoration, the ban was rescinded, freedom of religion was promulgated, and Protestant missionaries (プロテスタント Purotesutanto or 新教 Shinkyō, "renewed teaching") began to proselytise in Japan, intensifying their activities after World War II, yet they were never as successful as in Korea.

In 1996, Nagasaki Prefecture had the highest percentage of Christians, at about 5.1%. As of 2007 there were 32,036 Christian priests and pastors in Japan. According to a poll conducted by the Gallup Organization in 2006, Christianity had increased significantly in Japan, particularly among youth, and a high number of teens were becoming Christians.

Throughout the latest century, some Western customs, including Western style weddings, Valentine's Day and Christmas have become popular among many Japanese. In 2015, 60–70% of weddings performed in Japan were Christian-style. Christianity and Christian culture has a generally positive image in Japan.

=== Islam ===
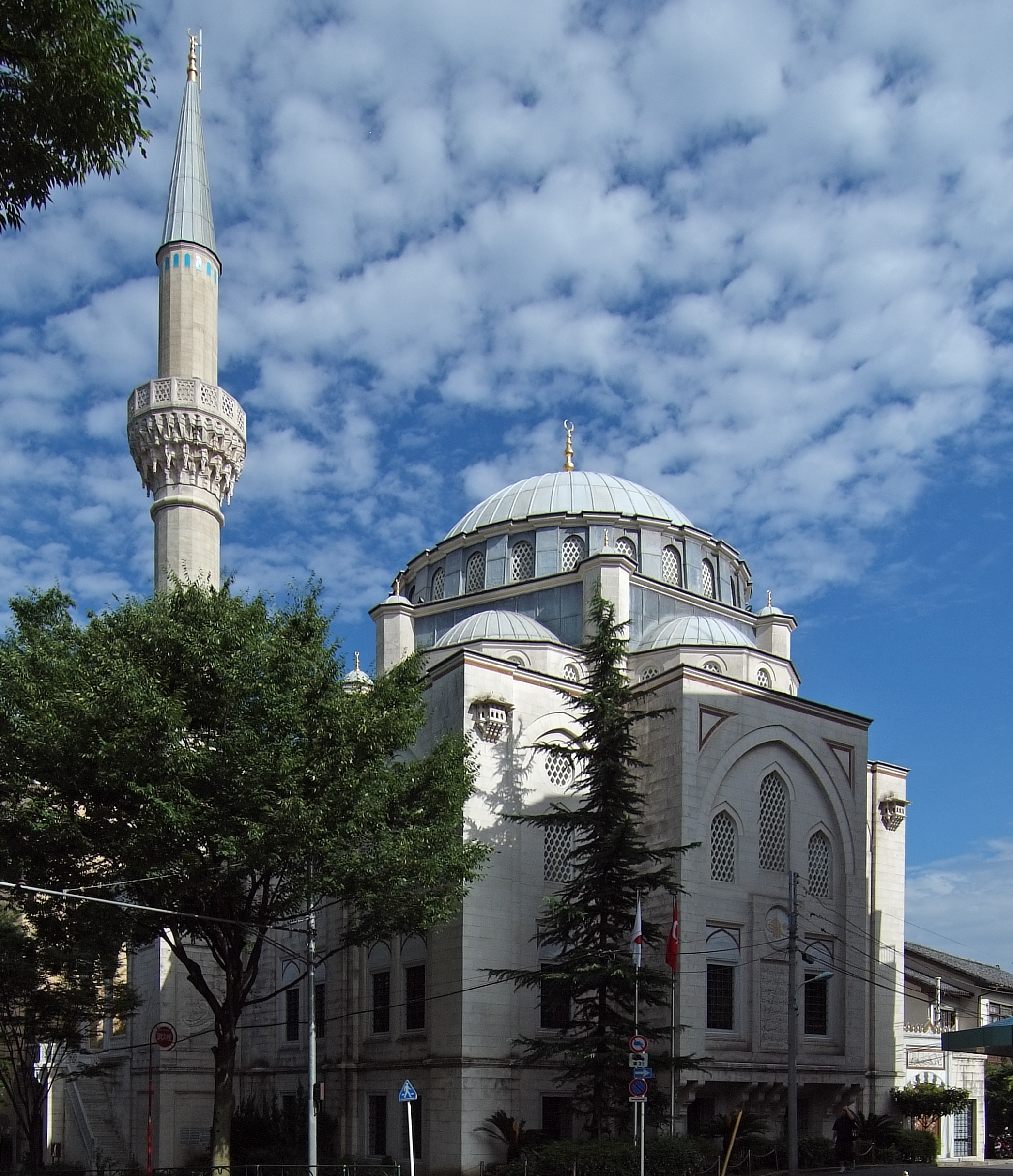
Tokyo Mosque, built in Ottoman style

Islam (イスラム教 Isuramukyō) in Japan is mostly represented by small immigrant communities from other parts of Asia. In 2008, Keiko Sakurai estimated that 80–90% of the Muslims in Japan were foreign-born migrants primarily from Indonesia, Pakistan, Bangladesh, and Iran. In 2007, the Muslim immigrant population was estimated to be 10,000–50,000 people, while the "estimated number of Japanese Muslims ranges from thousands to tens of thousands".

=== Bahá'í Faith ===
The Bahá'í Faith (バハーイー教 Bahāiikyō) in Japan began after a few mentions of the country by 'Abdu'l-Bahá first in 1875. The first Japanese convert was Kanichi Yamamoto (山本寛一), who lived in Honolulu, and accepted the faith in 1902. The second convert was Saichiro Fujita (藤田左弌郎). The first Bahá'í convert on Japanese soil was Kikutaro Fukuta (福田菊太郎) in 1915. In 2005, the Association of Religion Data Archives, relying on World Christian Encyclopedia, estimated some 15,700 Bahá'ís.

=== Judaism ===
Judaism (ユダヤ教 Yudayakyō) in Japan is practiced by about 2,000 Jews living in the country. With the opening of Japan to the external world in 1853 and the end of Japan's sakoku foreign policy, some Jews immigrated to Japan from abroad, with the first recorded Jewish settlers arriving at Yokohama in 1861. The Jewish population continued to grow into the 1950s, fueled by immigration from Europe and the Middle East, with Tokyo and Kobe forming the largest communities.

During World War II, some European Jews fleeing the Holocaust found refuge in Japan. These mainly Polish Jews received a so-called Curaçao visa from the Dutch consul in Kaunas, Jan Zwartendijk. This allowed one Japanese diplomat, Chiune Sugihara, the Japanese consul to Lithuania, to issue Japanese transit visa. In doing so, both Zwartendijk and Sugihara disregarded orders and helped more than 6,000 Jews escape the Nazis. After World War II, a large portion of Japan's Jewish population emigrated, many going to what would become Israel. Some of those who remained married locals and were assimilated into Japanese society.

There are community centres serving Jews in Tokyo and Kobe. The Chabad-Lubavitch organization has two centers in Tokyo.

In September 2015, Japan nominated a Chief Rabbi for the first time, the head of Tokyo's Chabad House, Rabbi Binyamin Edrei.

== Dharmic religions ==
=== Hinduism ===
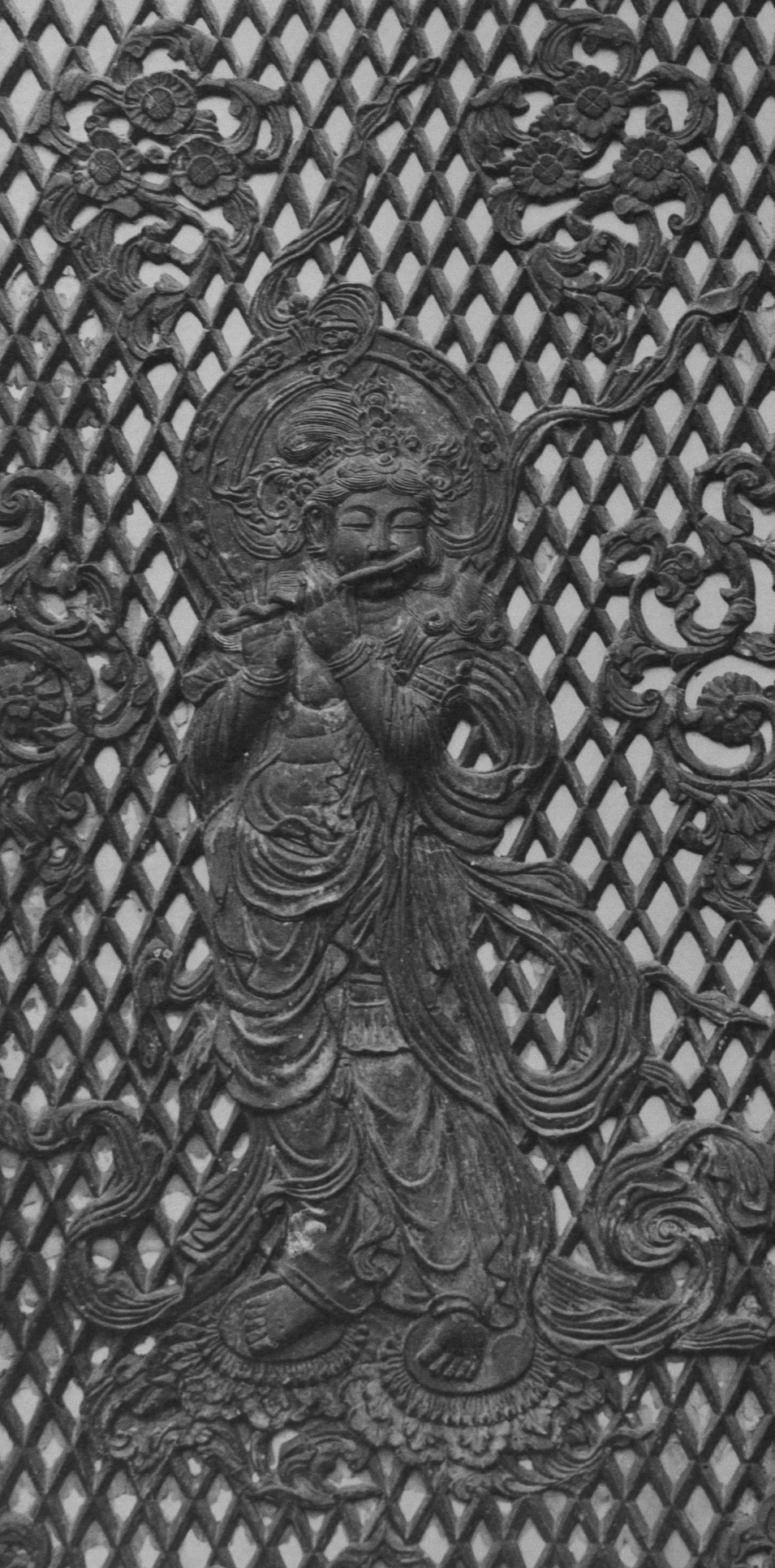
A depiction of the Hindu deity Krishna playing the flute in a temple constructed in 752 CE on the order of Emperor Shomu, Todai-ji Temple, Great Buddha Hall in Nara, Japan

Hinduism (ヒンドゥー教 Hindūkyō or 印度教 Indokyō) in Japan is practiced by a small number of people, mostly migrants from China, India, Nepal, and Bali. Nevertheless, Hindu culture have had a significant but indirect role in Japanese culture, through the spread of Buddhism and the fascination of ancient world about Bharatvarsha. Four of the Japanese "Seven Gods of Fortune" originated as Hindu deities, including Benzaiten (Sarasvati), Bishamon (Vaiśravaṇa or Kubera), Daikoku (Mahakala/Shiva), and Kisshoutennyo (Lakshmi). Various Hindu deities, including the aforementioned, are worshipped in Shingon Buddhism. This denomination and all other forms of Tantric Buddhism have multiple sources in common with Tantric Hinduism.

According to the Association of Religion Data Archives, there were 25,597 Hindus in Japan in 2020.

=== Sikhism ===
Sikhism (シク教 Sikukyō) is presently a minority religion in Japan mainly followed by families migrated from India. Sikh communities formed in the 1920s, primarily in Kobe and later in Tokyo. The Sikh population, though small, established gurdwaras. Notable figures include Maharaja Jagatjit Singh of Kapurthala who visited the country during 1903–1904.

=== Jainism ===
Jainism (ジャイナ教 Jainakyō) is a minority religion in Japan. As of 2009, there were three Jain temples in Japan. Minakata Kumagusu published the first simplified Japanese translation of Jainist concepts for common people.

== Traditional religions of East Asia ==
=== Ryukyuan religion ===
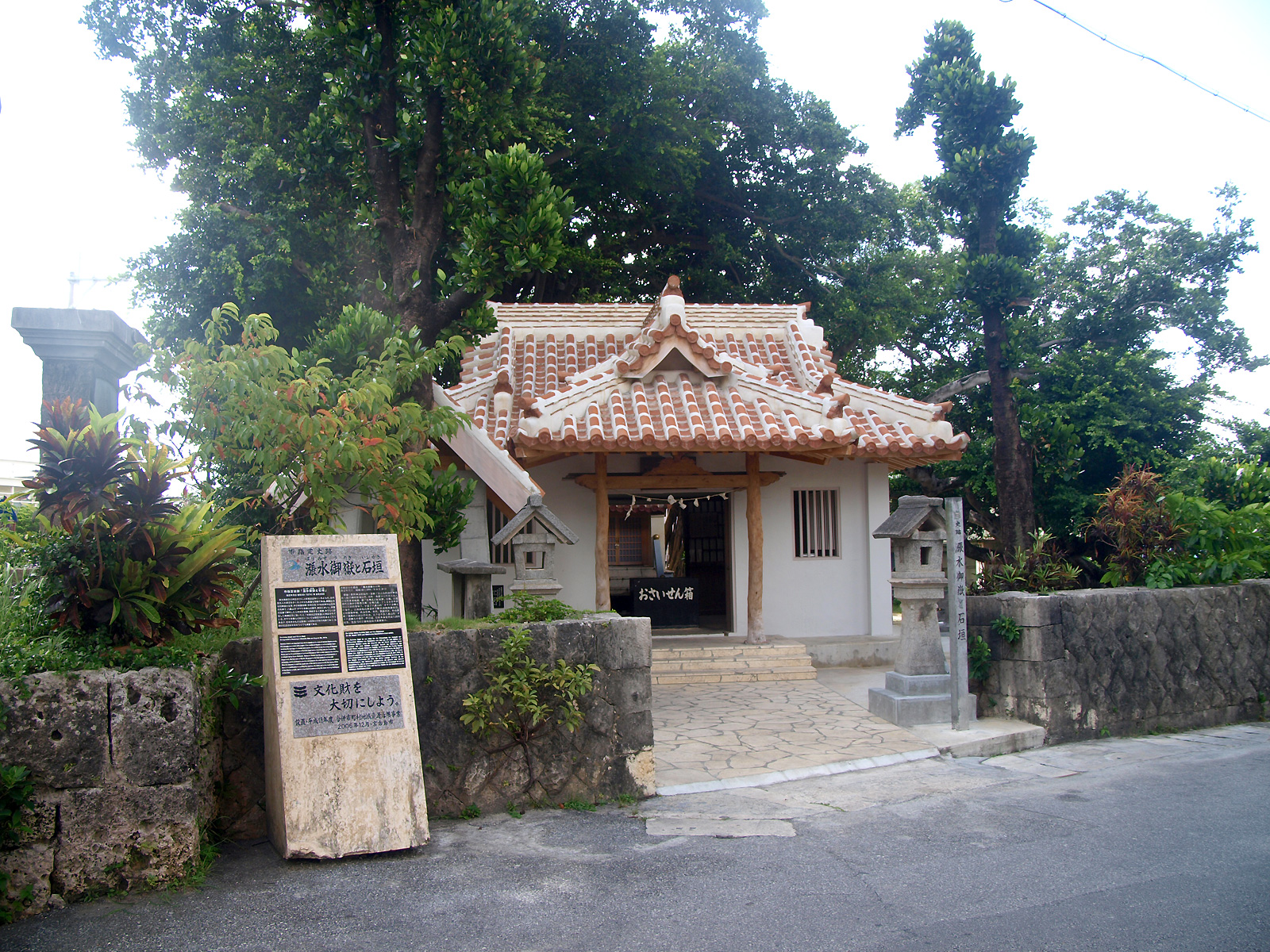
Harimizu utaki (Harimizu Shrine), a Ryukyuan shrine in Miyakojima, Okinawa Prefecture

The Ryukyuan religion is the indigenous belief system of the people of Okinawa and the other Ryukyu Islands. While specific legends and traditions may vary slightly from place to place and island to island, the Ryukyuan religion is generally characterized by ancestor worship (more accurately termed "ancestor respect") and the respecting of relationships between the living, the dead, and the gods and spirits of the natural world. Some of its beliefs, such as those concerning genius loci spirits and many other beings classified between gods and humans, are indicative of its ancient animistic roots, as is its concern with mabui (まぶい), or life essence.

One of its most ancient features is the belief onarigami (おなり神), the spiritual superiority of women derived from the goddess Amamikyu, which allowed for the development of a class of noro (priestesses) cult and yuta (female media). This differs from Japanese Shinto, where men are seen as the embodiment of purity. Ryukyuan religion has been influenced by Japanese Shinto and Buddhism, and various Chinese religions. It includes sects and reformed movements such as Ijun or Ijunism (Ryukyuan: いじゅん Ijun; Japanese: 違順教 Ijunkyō), founded in the 1970s.

=== Ainu folk religion ===
The Ainu religion Ainu no shūkyō (アイヌの宗教) is the indigenous belief system of the Ainu people of Hokkaido and parts of Far Eastern Russia. It is an animistic religion centered around the belief that Kamuy (spirits or gods) live in everything.

=== Chinese folk religion ===
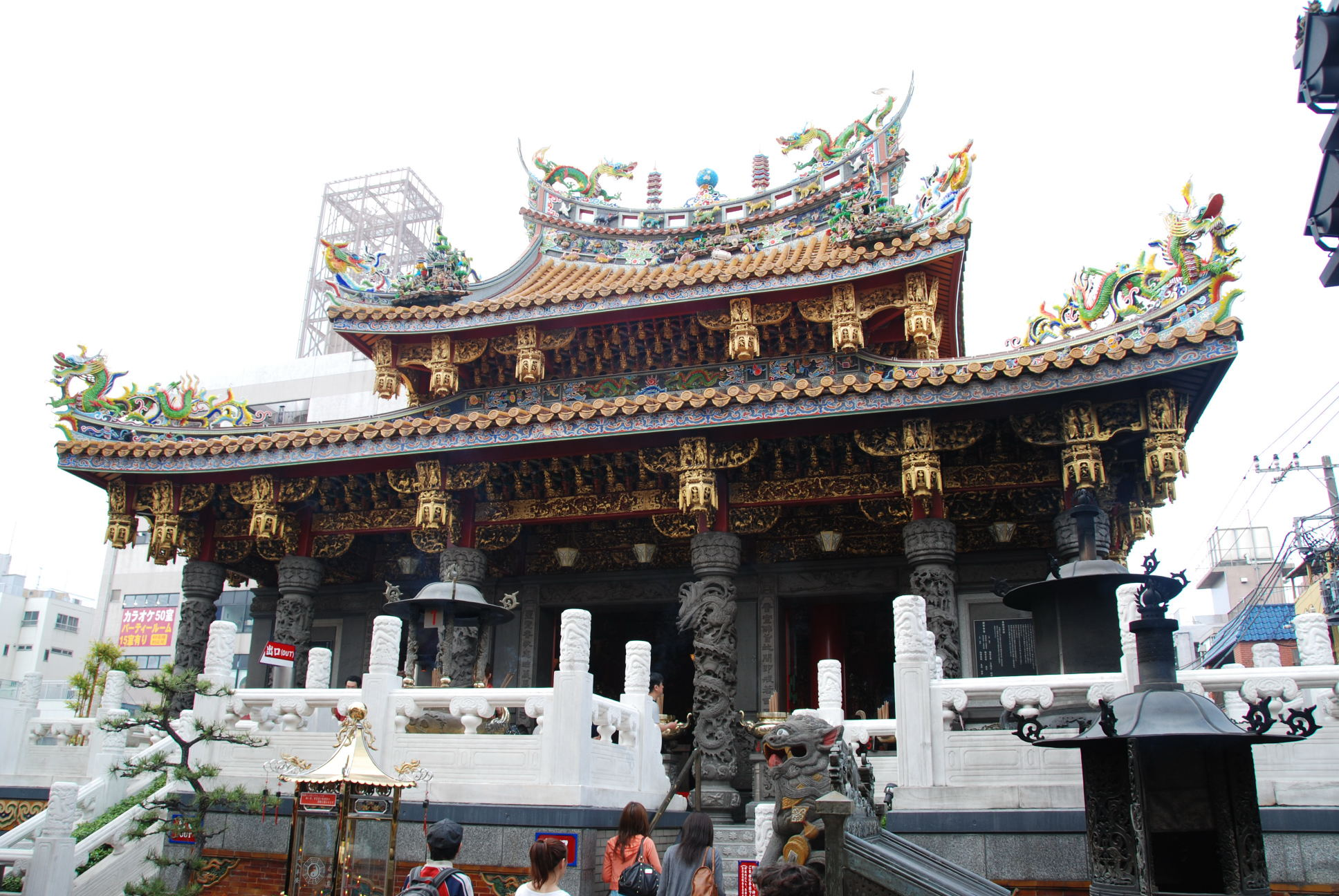
Temple of Guandi (關帝廟; Japanese: Kanteibyō, Chinese: Guāndìmiào) in Yokohama

Most Chinese people in Japan practice the Chinese folk religion (Chinese: 中国民间宗教 or 中国民间信仰; pinyin: Zhōngguó mínjiān zōngjiào or Zhōngguó mínjiān xìnyǎng; Japanese: 中国の民俗宗教; rōmaji: Chūgoku no minzoku shūkyō), also known as Shenism (Chinese: 神教; pinyin: Shénjiào; Japanese pronunciation: Shinkyō), that is very similar to Japanese Shinto.

The Chinese folk religion consists in the worship of the ethnic Chinese gods and ancestors, shen (神 "gods", "spirits", "awarenesses", "consciousnesses", "archetypes"; literally "expressions", the energies that generate things and make them thrive), which can be nature deities, city deities or tutelary deities of other human agglomerations, national deities, cultural heroes and demigods, ancestors and progenitors of kinships. Holy narratives regarding some of these gods are codified into the body of Chinese mythology.

=== Taoism ===
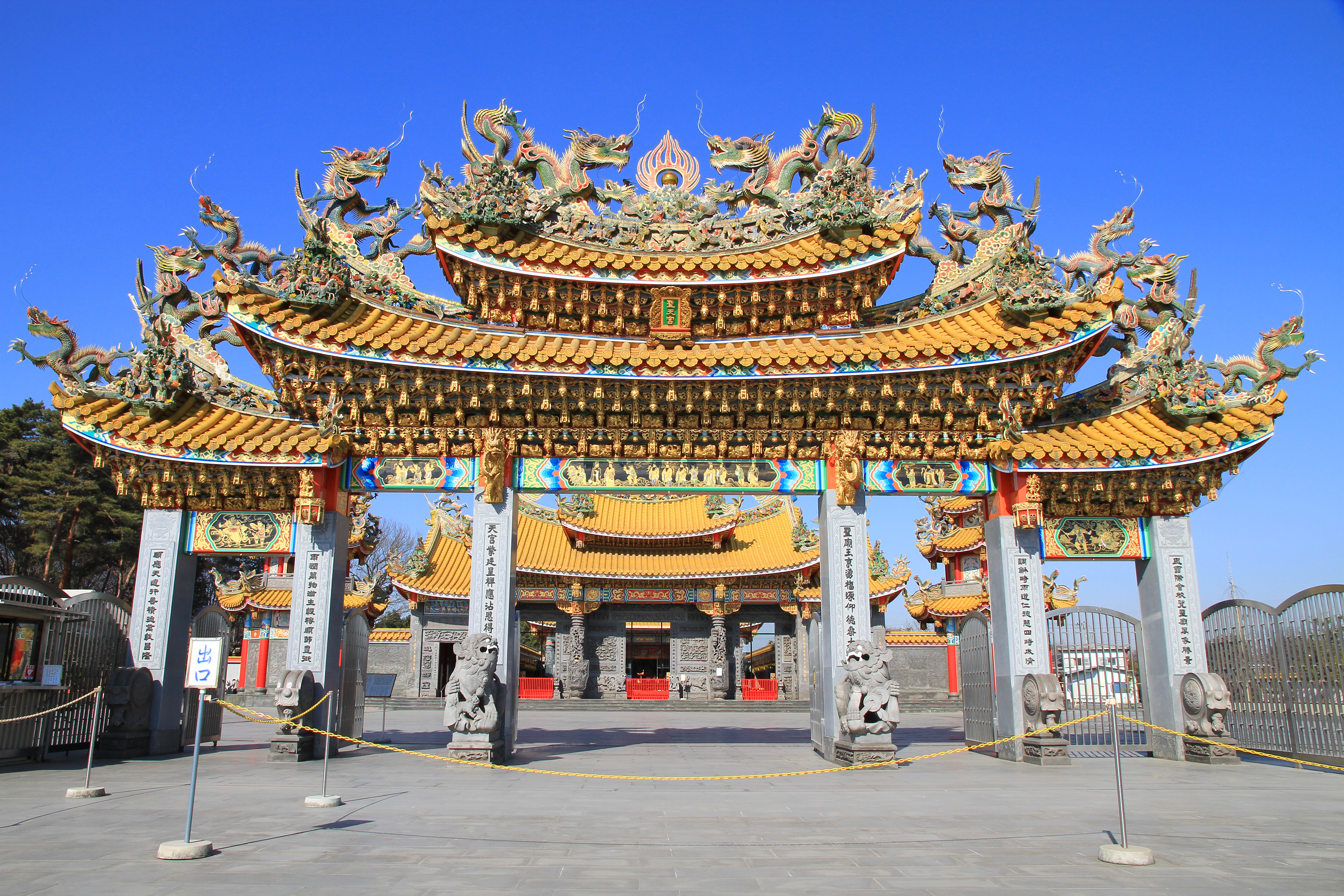
Seitenkyū (聖天宮; Chinese: Shèngtiāngōng, "Temple of the Holy Heaven"), a Taoist temple in Sakado, Saitama

Taoism (道教 Dōkyō) was introduced from China between the 7th and 8th centuries, and influenced in varying degrees the Japanese indigenous spirituality. Taoist practices were absorbed into Shinto, and Taoism was the source of the esoteric and mystical religions of Onmyōdō, Shugendō and Kōshin.

Taoism, being an indigenous religion in China, shares some roots with Shinto, although Taoism is more hermetic while Shinto is more shamanic. Taoism's influence in Japan has been less profound than that of Japanese Neo-Confucianism. Today, institutional Chinese Taoism is present in the country in the form of some temples; the Seitenkyū was founded in 1995.

=== Confucianism ===
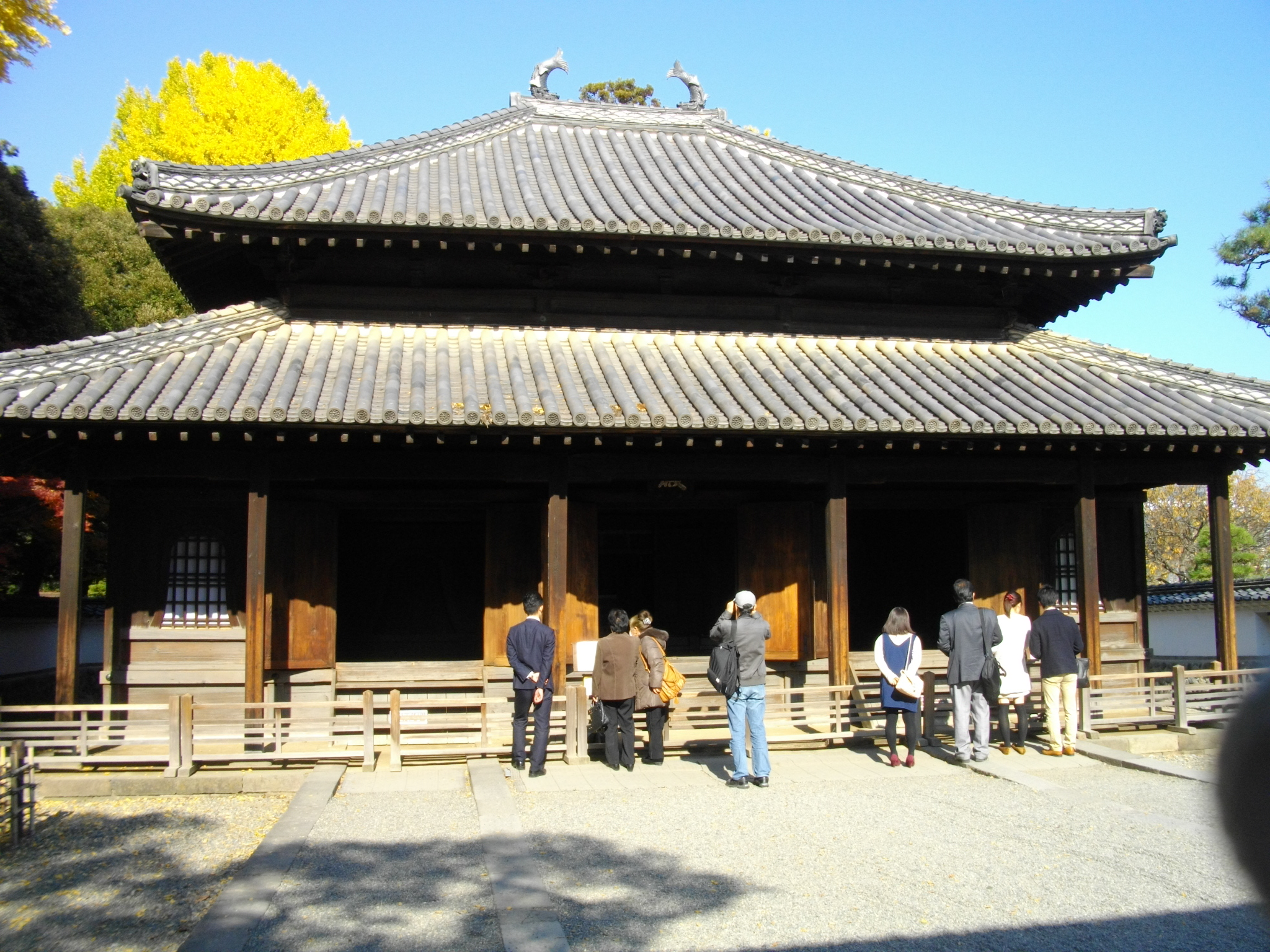
Kōshibyō (孔子廟, "Temple of Confucius") of the Ashikaga Gakko, the oldest Confucian school in Japan

Confucianism (儒教 Jukyō) was introduced from Korea during the Japanese invasions of Korea (1592–1598), and developed into an elite religion, yet having a profound influence on the fabric of Japanese society overall during the Edo period. The Confucian philosophy can be characterized as humanistic and rationalistic, with the belief that the universe could be understood through human reason, corresponding to the universal reason (li), and thus it is up to man to create a harmonious relationship between the universe (天 Ten) and the individual. The rationalism of Neo-Confucianism was in contrast to the mysticism of Zen Buddhism in Japan. Unlike the Buddhists, the Neo-Confucians believed that reality existed, and could be understood by mankind, even if the interpretations of reality were slightly different depending on the school of Neo-Confucianism.

The social aspects of the philosophy are hierarchical with a focus on filial piety. This created a Confucian social stratification in Edo society that previously had not existed, dividing Japanese society into four main classes: samurai, farmers, artisans and merchants. The samurai were especially avid readers and teachers of Confucian thought in Japan, establishing many Confucian academies.

Neo-Confucianism also introduced elements of ethnocentrism into Japan. As the Chinese and Korean Neo-Confucians had regarded their own culture as the center of the world, the Japanese Neo-Confucians developed a similar national pride. This national pride would later evolve into the philosophical school of Kokugaku, which would later challenge Neo-Confucianism, and its perceived foreign Chinese and Korean origins, as the dominant philosophy of Japan.

== Religious practices and holidays ==
Most Japanese participate in rituals and customs derived from several religious traditions. Life cycle events are often marked by visits to a Shinto shrine and Buddhist temples. The birth of a new baby is celebrated with a formal shrine or temple visit at the age of about one month, as are the third, fifth, and seventh birthdays (Shichi-Go-San) and the official beginning of adulthood at age twenty (Seijin shiki). The vast majority of Japanese wedding ceremonies have been Christian for at least the last three and half decades. Shinto weddings and secular weddings that follow a "western-style" format are also popular but much less so and a small fraction (usually less than one percent) of weddings are Buddhist.

Japanese funerals are usually performed by Buddhist priests, and Buddhist rites are also common on death day anniversaries of deceased family members. 91% of Japanese funerals take place according to Buddhist traditions.

There are two categories of holidays in Japan: matsuri (temple fairs), which are largely of Shinto origin (some are Buddhist like Hanamatsuri) and relate to the cultivation of rice and the spiritual well-being of the local community; and nenjyū gyōji (annual feasts), which are largely of Chinese or Buddhist origin. During the Heian period, the matsuri were organized into a formal calendar, and other festivals were added. Very few matsuri or annual feasts are national holidays, but they are included in the national calendar of annual events. Most matsuri are local events and follow local traditions. They may be sponsored by schools, towns, or other groups but are most often associated with Shinto shrines.

Some of the holidays are secular in nature, but the two most significant for the majority of Japanese—New Year's Day and Obon—involve visits to Shinto shrines or Buddhist temples and only Buddhist temples for the latter. The New Year's holiday (January 1–3) is marked by the practice of numerous customs and the consumption of special foods. Visiting Shinto shrines or Buddhist temples to pray for family blessings in the coming year, dressing in a kimono, hanging special decorations, eating noodles on New Year's Eve, and playing a poetry card game are among these practices. During Obon, bon (spirit altars) are set up in front of Buddhist family altars, which, along with ancestral graves, are cleaned in anticipation of the return of the spirits. People living away from their family homes return for visits with relatives. Celebrations include folk dancing and prayers at Buddhist temples as well as family rituals in the home.

== Religion and law ==
In early Japanese history, the ruling class was responsible for performing propitiatory rituals, which later came to be identified as Shinto, and for the introduction and support of Buddhism. Later, religious organization was used by regimes for political purposes; for instance, the Tokugawa government required each family to be registered as a member of a Buddhist temple. In the early 19th century, the government required that each family belong to a shrine instead, and in the early 20th century, this was supplemented with the concept of a divine right to rule bestowed on the emperor. The Meiji Constitution reads: "Japanese subjects shall, within limits not prejudicial to peace and order, and not antagonistic to their duties as subjects, enjoy freedom of religious belief".

Article 20 of the 1947 Constitution states: "Freedom of religion is guaranteed to all. No religious organization shall receive any privileges from the State, nor exercise any political authority. No person shall be compelled to take part in any religious act, celebration, rite or practice. The State and its organs shall refrain from religious education or any other religious activity". This change in constitutional rights provided mechanisms for limiting state educational initiatives designed to promote Shinto beliefs in schools and freed the populace from mandatory participation in Shinto rites.

In postwar years, the issue of the separation of Shinto and state arose in the Self-Defense Force Apotheosis Case. In 1973, Nakaya Takafumi, a member of the Japanese Self-Defense Forces and husband of Nakaya Yasuko, died in a traffic accident. Despite Yasuko's refusal to provide relevant documents for her husband's enshrinement at the Yamaguchi prefectural National-Protecting Shrine, the prefectural Veterans’ Association requested the information from the Self-Defense Forces and completed the enshrinement. As a result, in 1973, Yasuko sued the Yamaguchi Prefectural Branch of the Self-Defense Forces, on the grounds that the ceremony of apotheosis violated her religious rights as a Christian.

Although Yasuko won the case at two lower courts, the ruling was overturned by the Supreme Court of Japan on June 1, 1988, based on the precedent established by the Tsu City Shinto Groundbreaking Ceremony Case. First, the Supreme Court ruled that because the Veterans’ Association—which was not an organ of the state—had acted alone when arranging the ceremony of apotheosis, no violation of Article 20 had occurred. Second, the Supreme Court held that the Self-Defense Forces' provision of Takafumi's documents to the Veterans’ Association did not constitute a religious activity prohibited by Article 20, because neither the intention nor the effects of its action harmed or patronized any religion.

Third, the Supreme Court adopted a narrow interpretation of individual religious rights, by ruling that violation of individual rights to religion did not occur unless the state or its organs coerced individuals to perform some religious activity or limited their religious freedom. On June 2, 1988, a report by the Los Angeles Times described the Japanese Supreme Court's decision as “a major setback for advocates of stronger separation of religion and state in Japan.” On June 7, 1988, an article published in the New York Times expressed concern that the Japanese Supreme Court's decision was likely to encourage the resurgence of State Shinto and nationalism. Because the prefectural National-Protecting Shrines perform the same ceremony of apotheosis as the Yasukuni Shrine does, the significance of this case also lies in its implications for the constitutionality of state patronage of and official visits to the Yasukuni Shrine.

== Opposition to organised religion ==
In the early 1990s, Shichihei Yamamoto argued that Japan has shown greater tolerance towards irreligion than the West.

=== Comments against religion by notable figures ===
- Shin'ichi Hisamatsu, philosopher and scholar who rejected theism, claimed that God or Buddha, as objective beings, are mere illusions.
- Ito Hirobumi, four-time Prime Minister of Japan, who reportedly said: "I regard religion itself as quite unnecessary for a nation's life; science is far above superstition, and what is religion – Buddhism or Christianity – but superstition, and therefore a possible source of weakness to a nation? I do not regret the tendency to free thought and atheism, which is almost universal in Japan because I do not regard it as a source of danger to the community".
- Hiroyuki Kato, who headed the Imperial Academy from 1905 to 1909 and said: "Religion depends on fear".
- Haruki Murakami, a Japanese novelist who wrote: "God only exists in people’s minds. Especially in Japan, God's always has been a kind of flexible concept. Look at what happened to the war. Douglas MacArthur ordered the divine emperor to quit being a God, and he did, making a speech saying he was just an ordinary person".
- Ando Shoeki, who denounced Confucian scholars and Buddhist clergy as spiritual oppressors of his age, though he still venerated the gods of old Japan as a pantheist would, equating them with nature.
- Fukuzawa Yukichi, who was regarded as one of the founders of modern Japan and found it impossible to combine modern learning with belief in gods, openly declaring: "It goes without saying that the maintenance of peace and security in society requires a religion. For this purpose any religion will do. I lack a religious nature, and have never believed in any religion. I am thus open to the charge that I am advising others to be religious while I am not so. Yet my conscience does not permit me to clothe myself with religion when I have it not at heart...Of religions there are several kinds – Buddhism, Christianity, and what not. From my standpoint there is no more difference between those than between green tea and black...".

=== Anti-religious organisations ===
The Japan Militant Atheists Alliance (Nihon Sentoteki Mushinronsha Domei, also known as Senmu) was founded in September 1931 by a group of antireligious people. The alliance opposed the idea of kokutai, the nation's founding myth, the presence of religion in public education, and the practice of State Shinto. Their greatest opposition was towards the imperial system of Japan.

Two months later, in November 1931, socialist Toshihiko Sakai and Communist Takatsu Seido created the Japan Anti-religion Alliance (Nihon Hanshukyo Domei). They opposed "contributions to religious organizations, prayers for practical benefits (kito), preaching in factories, and the religious organizations of all stripes" and viewed religion as a tool used by the upper class to suppress laborers and farmers.

== Demographics ==
According to the annual statistical research on religion in 2015 by the Agency for Culture Affairs, Government of Japan, followers of Shintoism make up 70.4% of the total population, followers of Buddhism make up 69.8% of the population, followers of Christianity make up 1.5% of the population, and followers of other religions make up 6.9%. The Japanese National Character Survey of 2013 showed 72.0% of Japanese had no personal faith and the Japanese General Social Survey of 2015 showed 69.6% did not follow any religion.

According to surveys carried out in 2006 and 2008, less than 40% of the population of Japan identifies with an organized religion: around 35% are Buddhists, 3% to 4% are members of Shinto sects and derived religions, and from fewer than 1% to 2.3% are Christians. (Note: According to the Dentsu survey of 2006: 1% Protestants, 0.8% members of the Catholic Church and 0.5% members of the Eastern Orthodox Church.)

Organised religions in Japan
Religion	1984	1996	2008
Japanese Buddhism	27%	29.5%	34%
Shinto sects	3%	1%	3%
Christianity	2%	2%	1%

Organised religious affiliation in Japan by prefecture (1996)
Prefecture	Tendai or Shingon	Jōdo or Shin	Zen	Nichiren	Soka Gakkai	Other Buddhist schools	Buddhism overall	Shinto sects	Christianity	None
Hokkaido	~3%	13.3%	8.2%	3.2%	~2%	~2%	~31.7%	~2%	~1%	~65.3%
Aomori Prefecture	~1%	10.3%	5.6%	3.4%	~2%	~3%	~25.3%	~2%	~1%	~71.7%
Iwate Prefecture	~2%	6.1%	12.8%	~0	~2%	~3%	~25.9%	~0	~1%	~73.1%
Miyagi Prefecture	~3%	4.8%	9.5%	~2%	~2%	~2%	~23.3%	~0	~1%	~75.7%
Akita Prefecture	~0	6.9%	9.5%	~3%	~2%	~2%	~21.4%	~3%	~0	~75.6%
Yamagata Prefecture	~4%	5.6%	8.5%	~3%	~3%	3.4%	~27.5%	~2%	~1%	~69.5%
Fukushima Prefecture	5.2%	4.8%	5.2%	~0	~3%	~3%	~21.2%	~0	~0	~78.8%
Ibaraki Prefecture	7.1%	4.1%	~2%	~2%	~3%	~2%	~20.2%	~1%	~1%	~77.8%
Tochigi Prefecture	6%	3.1%	~3%	~3%	3.1%	~2%	~20.2%	~0	~1	~78.8%
Gunma Prefecture	6.6%	3.6%	5.8%	~3%	~3%	~2%	~24%	~1%	~2%	~73%
Saitama Prefecture	5.8%	5.2%	~3%	~2%	3.3%	~1%	~20.3%	~0	~2%	~77.7%
Chiba Prefecture	3.8%	4.5%	~1%	3.3%	~3%	~1%	~16.6%	~0	~1%	~82.4%
Tokyo	3.4%	8.3%	~2%	3.3%	4%	~2%	~23%	~1%	3.4%	~72.6%
Kanagawa Prefecture	~3%	5.5%	3.7%	3.7%	3.5%	~2%	~21.4%	~1%	~3%	~74.6%
Niigata Prefecture	3.2%	10.6%	4.9%	~1%	~2%	~2%	~23.7%	~1%	~1%	~74.3%
Toyama Prefecture	~2%	41.3%	~1%	~2%	~1%	~1%	~48.3%	~0	~0	~51.7%
Ishikawa Prefecture	~2	36.2%	~1%	~1%	~0	~3%	~43.2%	~1%	~1%	~54.8%
Fukui Prefecture	~2%	41.4%	5.5%	3.9%	~1%	~3%	~56.8%	~1%	~0	~42.2%
Yamanashi Prefecture	~1%	4.5%	6.2%	8.9%	~3%	~3%	~26.6%	~1%	~1%	~71.4%
Nagano Prefecture	3.5%	11.8%	7.6%	~2%	~3%	~2%	~29.9%	~1%	~1%	~68.1%
Gifu Prefecture	~3%	23.2%	6.8%	~1%	~3%	~1%	~38.1%	~1%	~1%	~59.9%
Shizuoka Prefecture	~1%	6.2%	9.4%	7.3%	3.6%	~4%	~31.5%	~1%	~1%	~66.5%
Aichi Prefecture	~3%	16.7%	8.5%	~1%	~3%	~2%	~34.2%	~2%	~2%	~61.8%
Mie Prefecture	~3%	22.9%	4.2%	~1%	~2%	~2%	~35.1%	~1%	~1%	~62.9%
Shiga Prefecture	3%	26.7%	3.2%	~2%	~3%	~0	~37.9%	~0	~1%	~61.1%
Kyoto Prefecture	~3%	17.5%	3.4%	~2%	~3%	~3%	~31.9%	~2%	~2%	~66.1%
Osaka Prefecture	5.9%	15.6%	~3%	3%	5.2%	~1%	~33.7%	~1%	~1%	~64.3%
Hyōgo Prefecture	8.6%	12.2%	3.1%	~3%	3.1%	~3%	~33%	~2%	~2%	~63%
Nara Prefecture	4.2%	17.3%	~1%	~3%	~3%	~2%	~30.5%	~0	~1%	~68.5%
Wakayama Prefecture	9.6%	13.5%	~3%	~1%	3.5%	~2%	~32.6%	~0	~0	~67.4%
Tottori Prefecture	~3%	10.4%	8.8%	4%	~2%	~3%	~31.2%	~3%	~1%	~64.8%
Shimane Prefecture	~4%	18.4%	6.5%	~2%	~1%	~3%	~30.9%	~2%	~1%	~66.1%
Okayama Prefecture	16.6%	5.1%	3%	5.9%	~3%	0	~33.6%	~2%	~1%	~63.4%
Hiroshima Prefecture	4.4%	35.3%	3.6%	~2%	4.9%	~1%	~51.2%	~2%	~2%	~44.8%
Yamaguchi Prefecture	~3%	21.9%	3.8%	~2%	3.8%	~1%	~35.5%	~1%	~1%	~62.5%
Tokushima Prefecture	19.8%	6.7%	~0	~1%	3%	~1%	~31.5%	~1%	~1%	~66.5%
Kagawa Prefecture	14%	18%	~1%	~2%	~3%	~1%	~39%	~0	~1%	~60%
Ehime Prefecture	9.3%	6.7%	5.3%	~2%	~3%	~1%	~27.3%	~1%	~2%	~69.7%
Kōchi Prefecture	6.3%	6.3%	~0	~1%	~3%	~1%	~17.6%	5.5%	~0	~76.9%
Fukuoka Prefecture	~2%	24.1%	3.3%	3%	3.3%	~2%	~37.7%	~1%	~2%	~59.3%
Saga Prefecture	~4%	21.9%	6.1%	~3%	~2%	~3%	~40%	~0	~0	~60%
Nagasaki Prefecture	4.9%	19.5%	3.6%	5.1%	~3%	~3%	~39.1%	~2%	5.1%	~53.8%
Kumamoto Prefecture	~2%	28.4%	~3%	~2%	~2%	~1%	~38.4%	~0	~1%	~61.6%
Ōita Prefecture	~3%	20.7%	4.7%	~3%	~3%	~1%	~35.4%	~2%	~1%	~61.6%
Miyazaki Prefecture	~3%	18.2%	~3%	~3%	~3%	3.3%	~33.5%	3.8%	~1%	~61.7%
Kagoshima Prefecture	~2%	29.8%	~1%	~2%	~3%	6%	~43.8%	~3%	~0	~53.2%
Okinawa Prefecture	~0	~0	~0	~0	3.6%	~0	~3,6%	~0	~3	~93.4%
Japan	4%	12.9%	4.1%	~3%	3%	~2.5%	~29.5%	~1%	~2%	~67.5%

== See also ==
- Ainu religion
- History of religion in Japan
- Koshinto
- Religion in Asia
- Religion in China
- Religion in Korea
- Religion in Mongolia

== Sources ==
- John Breen & Mark Teeuwen. Shinto in History. Richmond, Surrey: Curzon Press, 2000. ISBN 0700711708
- John Breen & Mark Teeuwen. A New History of Shinto. Blackwell, 2010. ISBN 1405155167
- Craig, Edward (1998), Routledge Encyclopedia of Philosophy, Volume 7, Taylor & Francis, ISBN 978-0-415-07310-3
- Delmer Brown & John Whitney Hall, eds. The Cambridge History of Japan, vol. 1: Ancient Japan. Cambridge: Cambridge University Press, 1993. ISBN 0521223520
- Earhart, H. Byron. Japanese Religion: Unity and Diversity, 5th edn. Belmont, Calif.: Wadsworth, 2014.
- Steven Engler & Gregory P. Grieve. Historicizing “Tradition” in the Study of Religion. Berlin: Walter de Gruyter, 2005. ISBN 3110188759. pp. 92–108
- Higashibaba, Ikuo (2002). Christianity in Early Modern Japan: Kirishitan Belief and Practice. Brill. ISBN 90-04-12290-7.
- Inoue, Nobutaka; et al. (2003). Shinto, a Short History. London: Routledge Curzon. Archived from the original on October 23, 2020 – via Questia.
- LeFebvre, J. (2015). ‘Christian Wedding Ceremonies: “Nonreligiousness” in Contemporary Japan’, Japanese Journal of Religious Studies, 42(2), 185–203. http://nirc.nanzan-u.ac.jp/nfile/4454
- LeFebvre, J. (2021). ‘The Oppressor's Dilemma: How Japanese State Policy toward Religion Paved the Way for Christian Weddings’, Journal of Religion in Japan. https://brill.com/view/journals/jrj/aop/article-1163-22118349-20210001/article-1163-22118349-20210001.xml
- Victoria Lyon-Bestor, Theodore C. Bestor, & Akiko Yamagata, eds. Routledge Handbook of Japanese Culture and Society. Routledge, 2011. ASIN B004XYN3E4, ISBN 0415436494
- Matsunaga, Daigan; Matsunaga, Alicia (1996), Foundation of Japanese Buddhism, Vol. 1: The Aristocratic Age, Los Angeles; Tokyo: Buddhist Books International. ISBN 0-914910-26-4
- Matsunaga, Daigan, Matsunaga, Alicia (1996), Foundation of Japanese Buddhism, Vol. 2: The Mass Movement (Kamakura and Muromachi Periods), Los Angeles; Tokyo: Buddhist Books International. ISBN 0-914910-28-0
- Matsunami, Kodo (2004). "A guide to Japanese Buddhism" (PDF). Tokyo: Japan Buddhist Federation. Archived (PDF) from the original on 2013-02-02.
- Picken, Stuart D. B. (1994). Essentials of Shinto an Analytical Guide to Principal Teachings. Westport, Conn.: Greenwood Press. ISBN 9780313369797.
- Reader, Ian. Religion in Contemporary Japan. Honolulu: University of Hawai'i Press, 1991.
- Shimazono, Susumu (2004). From Salvation to Spirituality: Popular Religious Movements in Modern Japan. Japanese Society Series. Melbourne, Vic.: Trans Pacific Press. ISBN 978-1-8768-4312-0.
- Sims, Barbara (1989). Traces That Remain: A Pictorial History of the Early Days of the Bahá'í Faith Among the Japanese. Osaka, Japan: Japan Bahá'í Publishing Trust.
- Staemmler, Birgit & Ulrich Dehn, eds. Establishing the Revolutionary: An Introduction to New Religions in Japan. Münster: LIT, 2011. ISBN 978-3-643-90152-1
- George Williams. Shinto. Philadelphia, Penn.: Chelsea House, 2004. ISBN 0791080978
