= H. Byron Earhart =

American historian (born 1935)

- Born: January 7, 1935 (age 91); Aledo, Illinois, U.S.
- Education: Knox College; University of Chicago
- Occupations: Historian; author
- Spouse: Virginia Margaret Donaho (m. 1956)
- Children: 3

H. Byron Earhart (born January 7, 1935) is an American historian, Ph.D, and author who specializes in Japanese religions.

== Life and studies ==
He was born on January 7, 1935, in Aledo, Illinois; son of Kenneth Harry and Mary (née Haack) Earhart. His father enlisted in the U.S. Navy in 1942 and served on the battleship USS Missouri. His grandparents and mother held a frozen food locker in Havana, Illinois. H. Byron Earhart married Virginia Margaret Donaho in 1956 and they had three children.

Earhart attended Knox College in Galesburg, majoring in philosophy and religion. He enrolled at the University of Chicago in a graduate program, got a Fulbright grant and went to Japan for three years of doctoral research. He studied under Mircea Eliade and Joseph M. Kitagawa at the University of Chicago, where he received a doctorate in History of Religions.

== Career ==
He is a professor emeritus in the Department of Comparative Religion at Western Michigan University from which he received in 1981 a Distinguished Faculty Scholar Award.

His textbook Japanese Religion: Unity and Diversity (1969) is considered a classic, through several editions, and "has remained one of the only treatments of Japanese religious history truly suitable for use in undergraduate classrooms".

== Bibliography (excerpts) ==
- Japanese Religion: Unity and Diversity, 1969, and later editions, also as Religion in Japan: Unity and Diversity
- The new religions of Japan: a bibliography of Western-language materials. xi, 96 pp. Tokyo: Sophia University, 1970. University of Michigan, 1983, pp. 213.
- Religion in the Japanese Experience: Sources and Interpretations. 1974. 1997
- Religions of Japan: Many Traditions Within One Sacred Way , 1984, 1998
- Religious Traditions of the World: A Journey Through Africa, Mesoamerica, North America, Judaism, Christianity, Islam, 1993
- Mount Fuji: Icon of Japan, Columbia: The University of South Carolina Press, 2011
- The World War II Homefront in Havana, Illinois: At Grandma's House. Southern Illinois University Press. 2020. ISBN 978-0-8093-7007-8.
