= History of religion in Japan =

The history of religion in Japan has been characterized by the predominance of animistic religions practiced by its mainland, Ryukyuan, and Ainu inhabitants. In addition, on the Yamato-dominated mainland, Mahayana Buddhism has also played a profoundly important role. Throughout the Japanese middle ages, many different schools of Buddhism flourished, such as Tendai, Shingon, Pure Land, Zen, Nichiren, and others. With time, Shinto and Buddhism gradually became intertwined with each other in Japanese culture, rather than being viewed as mutually exclusive.

The first conclusive appearance of western religions in Japan was Christianity, which had been introduced by European travelers beginning in 1549. Between 1614 and 1889, Christianity and all other foreign religions were banned and its adherents persecuted, with Buddhism being co-opted by the Tokugawa authorities as a means to keep the population in check through the danka system.

After this period ended, freedom of religion was restored with the Meiji Restoration, and it was in this period that Christianity once again began to pick up steam. Ironically, this period was marked by both the heavy persecution of Buddhism as well as the ascendancy of State Shinto to almost all walks of Japanese life. Following the end of World War II, the State Shinto machine was mostly disassembled, and Japan saw the rise of many new religions, the most popular one being Soka Gakkai, which is rooted in ideas from the indigenous Japanese Nichiren school of Buddhism. Traditional forms of Buddhism have stagnated heavily in modern history and contemporary Japanese society has been marked by high levels of secularism and apathy towards organised forms of religion in favour of unorganised local or personal expressions of spirituality through Shinto rituals and festivals.

== Ancient religious practices (before 538 CE) ==
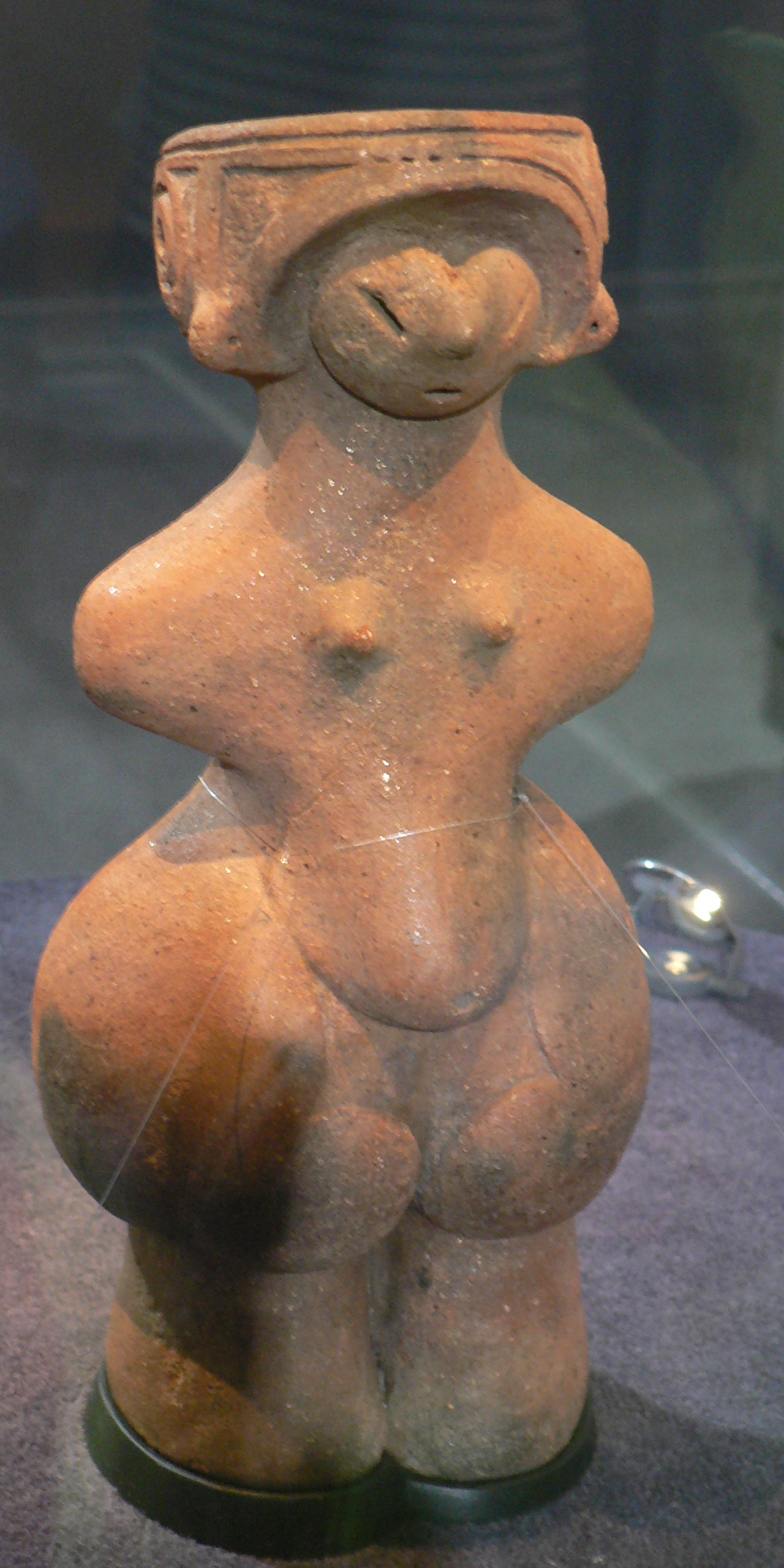
Jōmon Venus, a feminine dogū from 3,000 to 2,000 BC in modern-day Nagano prefecture.

The theoretical proto-religion from which modern indigenous forms of Japanese religion and spirituality, such as Shinto and Ainu religion, are descended from has been referred to as ko-shintō ("ancient shintō"). As there are no known writings from Japan preceding the 8th century AD, and Shinto as it appears in these early Japanese texts had already been influenced by mainland Asian religions, much of what can be gleaned about ancient Japanese religion comes from less direct sources, such as archaeology and the reports of ancient Chinese historians. There have also been attempts to philologically study the earliest Japanese texts in order to infer early pre-Buddhist and pre-Confucian Japanese spiritual beliefs and practices, but this historical project did not begin in earnest until the 17th century with the kokugaku school of historiography, and so it is examined much later in this article.

=== Jōmon spirituality ===
The earliest period of Japanese historiography is the hunter-gatherer Jōmon period, which is thought to have been primarily animistic. In the later centuries (14,000–400 BC) of this period, there was an emergence of distinctive material artifacts such as clay figurines (known to scholars as dogū), intricate ceramics, and masks. These were mainly excavated in eastern Japan and abruptly ceased being made at the onset of the following Yayoi period.

Scholars have put forth a number of hypotheses concerning their spiritual meaning. Some recurring themes in scholarly writing about dogū include prayers relating to: pregnancy, fertility, and childbirth; rebirth of buried persons and regeneration through the cycle of life and death; and exhumation. Most of the humanoid figurines are female in nature, with exaggerated breasts, hips, and bellies, and it is thought that these were used to pray for safe pregnancy and delivery of healthy children in a time where life expectancy was very low.

The Jomon people are also found to have constructed circular arrangements of stones (Japanese: 配石遺構 haiseki-ikō), which have also been found primarily in eastern Japan (the Ōyu Stone Circles are one example). The purpose of these stone arrangements seems to be even less clear than the dogū figurines, but some theories include that they are graves or places for sacred festivals. Their popularity began to wane slightly even before the Jomon period was completely over, and several feature stones made into phallic shapes.

=== Yayoi spirituality ===
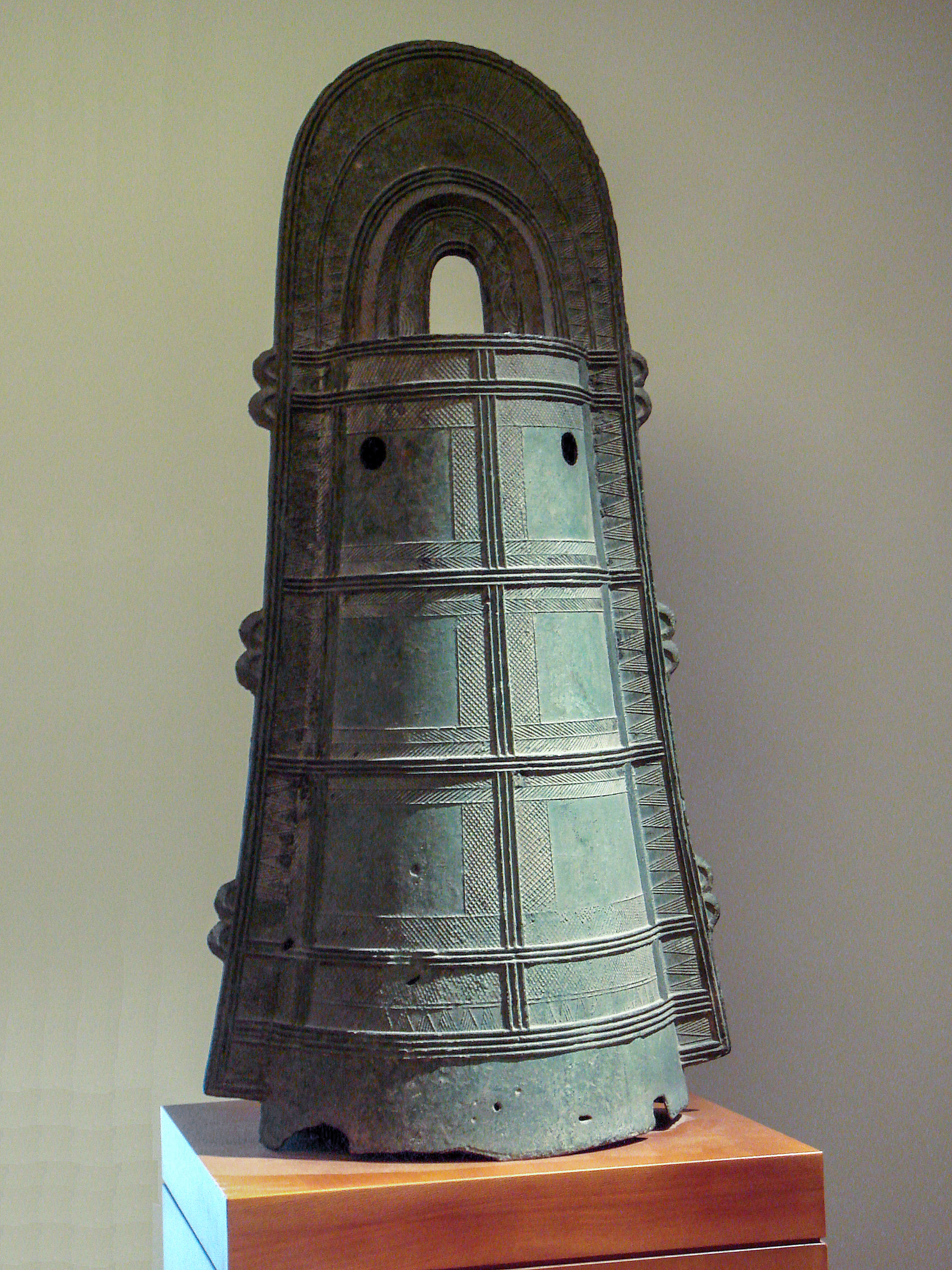
A Dotaku bronze bell, late Yayoi 3rd century

Sometime throughout the first millennium BC, the Japanese archipelago experienced a surge in continental east Asian immigrants who have been dubbed the Yayoi people by scholars. These immigrants formed societies which shifted the Japanese archipelago away from the hunter-gatherer life of the Jōmon people and towards more centralised agricultural wet-rice cultivation-based societies. Modern mainland Japanese (Yamato people) derive most of their genetic ancestry from these immigrants, and scholars generally agree that Japonic languages were introduced to the archipelago through these Yayoi migrants. Whether or not Jomon religious practices influenced Yayoi ones is harder to assess. Overall, most distinctively Jomon ritual practices ceased with the Yayoi period, although a few persisted. Some, such as phallic symbolism and clay figurines, continued in different forms, whereas others, such as tooth ablation, persisted into the Yayoi period.

As with the Jomon people, the Yayoi people left behind a distinctive material culture of their own. One of the most distinctive are large bronze dōtaku bells, thought to have evolved from earlier normal bells, and which were used almost exclusively for ritualistic purposes. Most of these were often buried in isolated hillsides away from settlements, an act itself which is thought to have been on purpose and for ritual purposes, although how to interpret it is heavily debated. One view is that some of these were used when praying for rain, an observation supported by the fact that many dotaku contain images of "flower water, waterfowl, fish, boats, and agricultural objects." The Yayoi period saw an advance in the kinds of weapons being used and martial culture became more prominent. As the period progressed, impractically stylised wooden weapons began to be built, indicating a connection between warfare and ritual.

Augmenting the discussion of dōtaku illustrations, pictorial representations of a wide variety of animals proliferated in this era, but deer most of all, leading scholars to suspect that deer played a strong role in Yayoi religion. It is the most common animal drawn on dōtaku as well as pottery. The 3rd century Chinese San Guo Zhi records that the people of Wa regularly performed divination by observing cracks in burnt bones, a practice thought to have been introduced by the Yayoi. The archaeological record indicates that deer bones were the most common animal bones prior to the Nara period and were found in many areas throughout Japan.

An enduring significance of deer may be found in early histories such as the 8th century Regional Records of Harima Province (Harima no Kuni Fudoki), which speaks of a local "magical ritual of sowing seeds in deer blood that was used to speed up the germination of rice plants." The material record also indicates a strong connection between the presence of deer antlers on artifacts and the cycles of rice cultivation and harvest. The archaeological record also indicates that the spiritual prominence of bone divination and deer may have its origins in the Korean peninsula from which the Yayoi people came. Early literature such as the Nihon Shoki contain many stories of deer, connecting them to divinity. Birds have also played a prominent role in Yayoi ritual and spirituality.

There are also religious practices of the Yayoi period which have been connected to modern Japanese spirituality. Composed around 297 AD, the Wei Zhi (part one of the San Guo Zhi), in its discussion of the people of Wa, states that "in their worship, men of importance simply clap their hands instead of kneeling or bowing," which may indicate continuity with the ubiquitous modern Japanese practice of hakushu (clapping for ritual prayer).

Perhaps the most well-known figure of Yayoi-period Japan is Pimiko (or Himiko), who is described as a shamaness-queen of Yamatai who ruled in the 3rd century AD according to the San Guo Zhi. This text says that Pimiko "occupied herself with magic and sorcery, bewitching the people," and that she ruled with the help of her younger brother, also a shaman. Mysteriously, early Japanese records such as the Kojiki do not mention her, and so the extent to which the religious attributes ascribed to Pimiko have continuity with later Japanese practices is a matter of debate, although some have speculated as to whether Pimiko is identical with other somewhat similar figures such as Empress Jingū and Yamatohime-no-mikoto.

https://www.jstor.org/stable/1062069

== Transitional epoch (538 CE – 1185 CE) ==
=== The arrival of Buddhism from Asia ===
In the Yayoi and Asuka periods, Japan began to see the introduction of continental Asian culture and technology from China and Korea. The first "official" transmission of Buddhism to Japan was dated to 552 AD by the Nihon Shoki, when King Seong of Baekje sent an envoy with Buddhist monastics, images, and scriptures to the court of Emperor Kinmei. However, scholars prefer an earlier date of about 538 AD.[CITE TAMURA] Initially, some clans such as the Mononobe and Nakatomi were resistant to the new religion, whereas others such as the Soga and Hata (the latter being of immigrant origins) supported it. The Emperor decreed that only the Soga clan may worship the Buddha in order to "test its efficacy." The Nihon Shoki records some attacks against Buddhist statues from nativists who believed that worshiping foreign kami was causing epidemics and disasters.

The question of whether or not Buddhism had been introduced prior is a matter of debate. The Chinese Book of Liang, written in 635, claims that five Buddhist monks from Gandhara visited the mythical eastern land of Fusang in 467 with scriptures and preached to the native people. Although the term Fusang became a poetic name for Japan in later centuries, and thus some have speculated that these monks visited Japan, the Book of Liang differentiates Fusang from the Wa (Japanese) kingdoms in the western Japanese archipelago during the Yamato period, and some other candidates for the identity of Fusang (assuming it to be a real account) include Sakhalin, the Kamchatka peninsula, and the Kuril Islands.

In any event, Japan had experienced Chinese and Korean immigration during this period and it has been argued that there would be some introduction of Buddhism by locals before it formally reached the Imperial house in 538 AD. The significantly later 12th century Fusō Ryakki claims that a Chinese individual named Ssu-ma Ta-teng (Shiba Tatto or Shiba Tatsuto in Japanese) emigrated to Japan and built a hut with a Buddhist image inside, and that his daughter Shimane took vows in 584, the first ordination in Japan. Ta-teng's grandson was said to be Kuratsukuri no Tori, the progenitor of Buddhist sculpture in Japan.[CITE TAMURA]

=== Earliest indigenous literature and Japanese mythology ===
In the 8th century, the Kojiki and Nihon Shoki were written; these are the earliest known writings in the Japanese language and provide an important source of information about ancient Japanese religion. The kojiki describes, among other things, Japanese mythology and divine origin stories for the Japanese imperial line. It also describes the animistic kami and their interactions with human beings.

=== Heian Buddhism ===
In the Heian period, the two prominent forms of Buddhism which developed were Tendai, a Mahayana school derived from Chinese Tiantai, and Shingon, a Vajrayana school derived from Chinese Esoteric Buddhism. The centre of Japanese Buddhism was Mount Hiei near the old capital of Kyoto.

=== Influence of Buddhism on Shinto practices ===
Buddhist doctrines were gradually applied to indigenous Shinto rituals and gave a more sophisticated understanding of native concepts, such as the kami, through a Buddhist lens.

Although Buddhism and Shinto were gradually intermixed, there remained some Shinto shrines such as Izumo-taisha which had kept the two separate since early times.

=== Other religious traditions ===
While never directly introduced to a profound extent into Japan like Buddhism and Confucianism were, the indirect influence of some Daoist ideas can be seen on native Japanese traditions such as onmyōdō and shugendō.

Some scholars, such as P. Y. Saeki, have promoted a fringe theory which argues that Asian Nestorian Christians arrived in Japan as early as the Yamato period and that the religion was able to spread and thrive in some areas. Although it is possible that a few Nestorians may have visited Japan from the Tang dynasty or through the unsuccessful Mongol invasions of Japan, there is no widely accepted evidence that Christian teachings successfully spread in Japan before the arrival of Europeans in the 16th century.

At least one official from Persia was known to be working in the ancient capital at Nara around the 8th century, and the two nations had indirect trade relations through the Silk Road since at least the 7th century. However, the religion that this official practiced is unknown, and the issue of whether or not religions originating from west of India had any influence on early Japan is speculative at best.

== Medieval strife and religious reformation (1185 CE – 1651 CE) ==
Following the establishment of the Kamakura shogunate, a number of new Buddhist schools sprang up in Japan which have come to be known as the Kamakura Buddhist schools. These new schools developed in reaction against, firstly, the traditional Buddhist establishment at Mount Hiei. Although most of the major early teachers of Kamakura Buddhism received their religious training in the Tendai of Mount Hiei, they later sought to move beyond it because they felt it had become too corrupted by political intrigue and was increasingly unable to meet the spiritual needs of the people.

These new Buddhists also reacted, secondly, against the deteriorating political situation in Japan, where different regional clan factions and the Imperial court in the capital city entered into conflict with each other. In addition, natural disasters were common and there was still fear of external invasion by the Mongols in spite of earlier failed invasions. This new epoch was identified by Japanese Buddhists as mappo, the age in Buddwasdashist eschathology characterised by degeneracy and the loss of dharma.

== Tokugawa stability (1651 CE – 1868 CE) ==
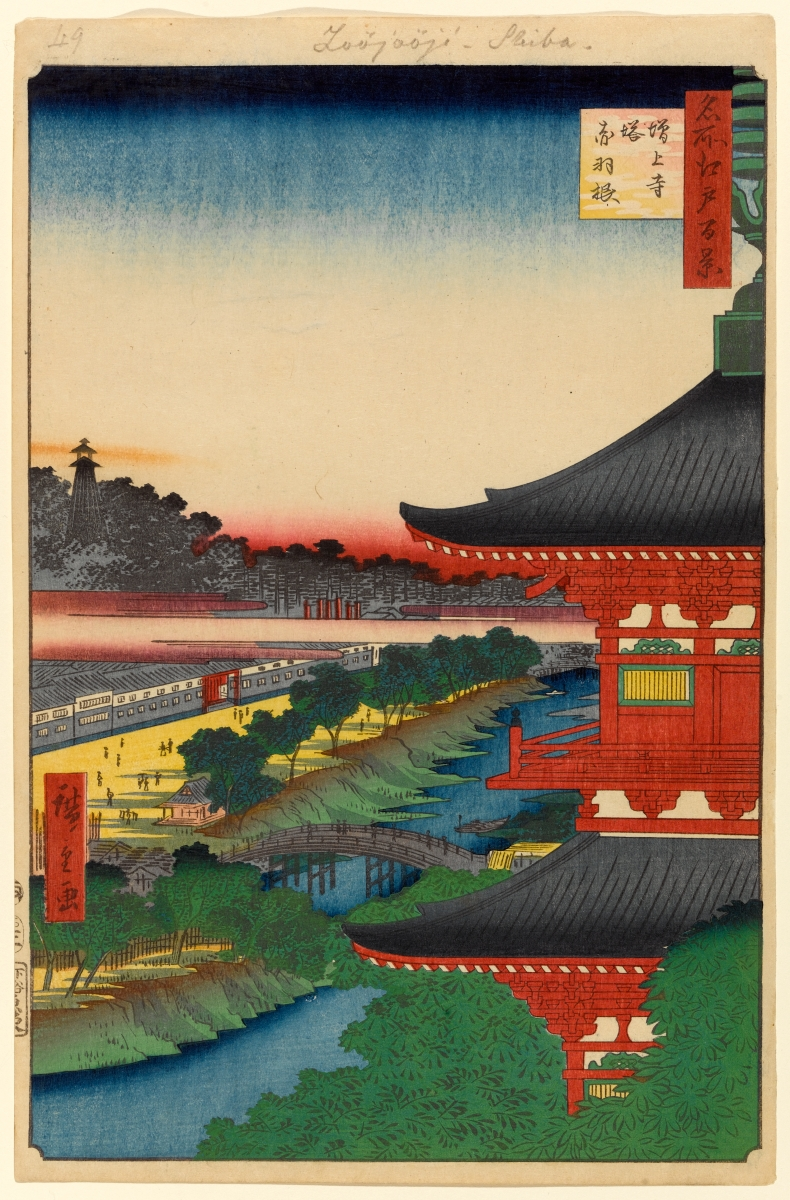
The familial temple of Tokugawa Ieyasu, Zōjō-ji, as depicted by Hiroshige in 1857

Buddhism and Confucianism were the state religions of Tokugawa Japan, with most emperors being Buddhist. For example, Emperors like Tokugawa Ieyasu was known for his devotion to the Jōdo-shū school of Buddhism throughout his life, having been born into the Matsudaira clan which followed Jōdō Buddhism. As a way of demonstrating his constant favor towards the sect, he moved his familial temple to the Zōjō-ji Temple in Edo and funded massive renovations to older Jōdo temples, including the head temple of Chion-in in Kyoto, while also financing the creation of several new temples.

After confiding in the abbot of Zōjō-ji temple about wanting to become a deity to protect his country, he was given advice to regularly recite the nembutsu for the purpose of being born into Amida Buddha's Pure Land of Sukhavati, where he would be able to easily attain Buddhahood and protect his descendants and the entire nation of Japan. Ieyasu readily accepted this advice, and constantly repeated the nembutsu until the day he died. Despite his personal devotion to Jōdo-shū, Ieyasu was not a strict sectarian, placing his secretary Denchōrō, a Rinzai Zen monk, in charge of all religious affairs in Japan, Buddhist and Shinto alike.

== Meiji Restoration and religious upheaval (1868 CE – 1945 CE) ==
This earlier Shinto revival culminated in the development of State Shinto in the Empire of Japan. The Meiji reformers sought to suppress Buddhism and its social network of temple parishes, replacing people's religious allegiance to local Buddhist groups with integration into the hierarchical state religion of Shinto.

The influence of western ideas lead to the establishment of freedom of religion under the Meiji Constitution, allowing Christians to come out of hiding and for new Christians to appear as a result of missionary work. It also saw Japan being introduced to other foreign religions such as Islam, albeit in much smaller numbers.

== Post-war affluence, secularism, and new religions (1945 CE and after) ==
The American occupation of Japan forcibly dismantled the State Shinto system, not only through legal revision, but also through symbolic gestures such as pressuring Emperor Hirohito to renounce his traditional claims of divinity. A more perfect freedom of religion was also guaranteed under the new constitution as well.

Post-war Japan also saw a proliferation of new religions which adopted traditional spiritual beliefs to modern urban people's needs.

The Tokyo sarin gas attack led to increased skepticism towards new religious movements.
