= Janak =

Janak may refer to:

- Janaka, a character in the ancient Indian epic Ramayana
- Janak Raj (disambiguation)
- Janak Premalal, Sri Lankan actor
- Janak Ram, Indian politician
- Janak Trivedi, Indian writer
- Janak Singh, Indian politician
- Janak Palta McGilligan, Indian social worker
- Janak Singh (politician), Indian politician
- Janak Joshi, Indian-American politician
- Janak Desai, Indian urologist
- Janak Gamage, Sri Lankan cricketer
- Janak Dave, Indian playwright
- Janak Sapkota, Nepalese poet
- Janak Prakash, Singaporean-Indian cricketer
- Janak Prasad Humagain, Nepalese writer

== See also ==
- Janák, Czech surname
- Janaka (disambiguation)
- Janaki (disambiguation)
- Janakpur (disambiguation)
- Janakpuri (disambiguation)
