= Janaki =

Janaki may refer to:

== People ==
- Janaki Amma (1920–2005), Indian judge of the Kerala High Court
- Janaki Ammal (1897–1984), Indian botanist
- Janaki Ballabh (1928–2022), Indian sinologist and translator
- Janaki Ballabh Patnaik (1927–2015), Indian politician
- Janaki Devi Bajaj (1893–1979), Indian independence activist
- Janaki Devi Ram (born 1955), Nepalese politician
- Janaki Sabesh (born 1964), Indian media professional
- Janaki Sharan Sah (born 1963), Nepalese politician
- Janaki Venkataraman (1921–2010), First Lady of India 1987–1992
- Janaki Vishwanathan (fl. from 2001), Indian film maker
- K. P. Janaki Ammal (1917–1992), Indian politician
- S. Janaki (1938–2026), Indian playback singer
- Sowcar Janaki (1931-2026), Indian actress
- V. N. Janaki (1923–1996), Indian politician, actress and activist
- Vaidehi (Kannada writer) (Janaki Srinivasa Murthy, born 1945), Indian fiction writer
- Janakiammal (1899–1994), wife of Srinivasa Ramanujan

== Places ==
- Junaki, or Janaki, Fars, Iran
- Janaki Rural Municipality (disambiguation), places in Nepal

== Other uses ==
- Sita, also known as Janaki, a Hindu goddess of the Ramayana
- Janaki Intercity Express, a train between Manihari and Jaynagar in India
- Janaki Mandir, a Hindu temple in Janakpurdham, Nepal
- Janaki Medical College, Dhanusha District, Nepal
- Janaki String Trio, an American music group

== See also ==
- Jonaki (disambiguation)
- Janak (disambiguation)
- Janaka (disambiguation)
- Janakpur (disambiguation)
- Janakpuri (disambiguation)
