= Socioeconomic development and the Baháʼí Faith =

The Bahá'í approach to social and economic development views development as a process of learning to advance both the material and spiritual dimensions of society. It is based on the principle that every human being possesses inherent nobility and capacities that can be cultivated through education, service, and participation in community life.

A central theme is the oneness of humanity, which from a Bahá'í perspective implies that the well-being of every people is bound together. It is interwoven with an understanding of diversity as a vital expression of human reality that enriches collective learning and enables communities to contribute to processes of social and economic development in various ways as their own circumstances and resources permit.

Development is not understood as something done by one group for another, but as a collective enterprise in which all people become active participants—or "protagonists"—in improving their communities and contributing to the common good. Other central themes include freedom from racial prejudice, the need for universal education, the elimination of the extremes of wealth and poverty, and the equality of women and men.

The Bahá'í approach emphasizes:

- Capacity building: strengthening individuals, communities, and institutions so that they can identify challenges, apply existing knowledge from science and religion, learn from experience, and take increasingly effective action.
- Consultation and participation: decisions are made through inclusive, cooperative processes that seek truth and consensus rather than competition or conflict.
- The harmony of material and spiritual progress: social advancement requires not only material advancement but also the cultivation of qualities such as justice, trustworthiness, cooperation, and service.
- Learning and organic growth: development efforts should emerge from local realities, draw on available resources within the community, and evolve through a continuous process of action, reflection, and learning.

In essence, the Bahá'í vision sees social and economic development not merely as the provision of goods and services, but as a process of individual and collective transformation that promotes human dignity, justice, unity, and the flourishing of communities.

== Historical developments ==
The Bahá'í approach to social and economic development is rooted in the sacred scriptures of the Bahá'í Faith, which set forth a process for advancing civilization and cultivating human capacities. It is grounded in the affirmation of Bahá'u'lláh, the Prophet Founder of the Faith, that all people "have been created to carry forward an ever-advancing civilization," and His admonition: "Be anxiously concerned with the needs of the age ye live in, and centre your deliberations on its exigencies and requirements.

Efforts to put Bahá'u'lláh's writings into practice can be traced to the early history of the Bahá'í Faith in Iran, when Bahá'ís established schools, promoted education for girls and women, and undertook initiatives aimed at social improvement. In the twentieth century, these efforts expanded around the world, particularly as the Bahá'í community grew in Africa, Asia, and Latin America. A major turning point came in 1983, when the Universal House of Justice—the international governing council of the Bahá'í Faith—established the Office of Social and Economic Development (OSED) to encourage and coordinate development activities worldwide. The Office emerged during a period of expanding Bahá'í involvement in development work and helped provide institutional support for projects related to education, literacy, health, agriculture, and community development. Since then, Bahá'í development efforts have increasingly emphasized community participation, capacity building, education, and local empowerment, reflecting a vision of development that integrates both material and spiritual dimensions of human progress.

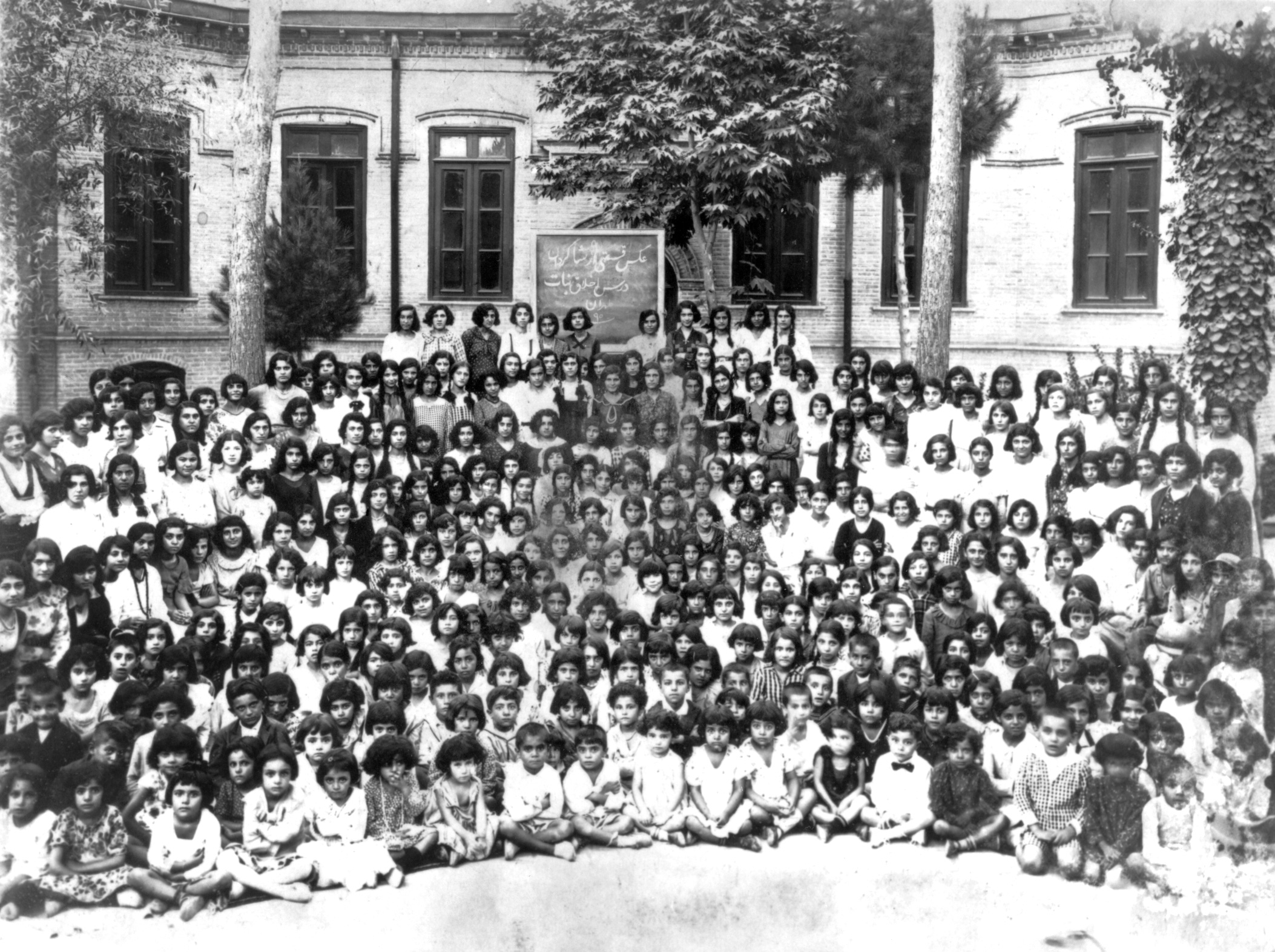
School for Girls, Tehran, Iran, August 1933. The school was closed by government decree in 1934. See Baháʼí Faith in Iran.

=== Evolution of the Bahá'í International Development Organization ===
In November 2018, the Universal House of Justice announced that the Office of Social and Economic Development would evolve into the Bahá'í International Development Organization (BIDO), a new institution established at the Faith's headquarters in Haifa, Israel. According to the announcement, the new organization would assume the functions and mandate of OSED while gradually expanding its capacity to support social and economic development efforts throughout the worldwide Bahá'í community.

The transition followed more than thirty-five years of growth in Bahá'í social action and development activities. During this period, Bahá'í development efforts became increasingly coordinated through administrative institutions and networks operating in numerous countries.

The Bahá'í International Development Organization formally began operating in 2019 under a board of directors appointed by the Universal House of Justice. Since that time, it has worked to ensure that "efforts at the local level are connected to and benefit from a body of knowledge generated by experiences of communities across the globe."

== Current situation ==
In 2023, the Bahá'í International Development Organization shared in a publication it prepared, that there are over 100,000 activities of fixed duration—mostly informal in nature and brought to a close when their objectives have been met—which embrace a range of efforts from those that support children in their education to activities that address an environmental issue or health concern; more than 2,000 sustained community-based projects, which include schools, radio stations, health clinics, literacy programs, and community gardens; and 170 Baháʼí-inspired development organizations—several of them listed below—which generally oversee one or more sophisticated development programs.

=== Statistics ===
The table below offers a numerical summary of development activities over the last several decades.

Baháʼí Development Activities Worldwide	1996	2001	2006	2011	2017	2023
Activities of fixed or limited duration	>1,300	>2,400	>7,000	>18,000	>40,000	100,000
Sustained projects	>250	>500	>650	>1,100	>1,400	2,000
Baháʼí inspired organizations	39	62	83	118	135	170

== Descriptions of select Bahá'í-inspired development organizations ==
=== FUNDAEC ===
Fundación para la Aplicación y Enseñanza de las Ciencias (FUNDAEC) was established in 1974 to engage in research and action to address the needs of rural populations in Colombia. After having developed a secondary education program known as Sistema de Aprendiaje Tutorial (SAT), which generated much interest among other Bahá'í-inspired organizations, it developed the Preparation for Social Action program, and has since been learning about its implementation. FUNDAEC's other lines of action include the Supporting Community Leaders program, which assists young people to pursue a path of study and work, and the Leadership and Community Development program, which aims to promote learning alongside local leaders and organizations about how to resolve challenges facing their communities.

=== Kimanya-Ngeyo Foundation ===
The Kimanya-Ngeyo Foundation for Science and Education was established in 2007 to work toward the empowerment of youth and the development of communities in Uganda through the application, generation, and systematization of knowledge. To this end, it implements the Preparation for Social Action (PSA) program in several villages in the country and has reached over a thousand individuals. It also carries out an agricultural research program and an in-service teacher-training program, assisting local teachers in public schools to reflect on the aims of education and to enhance their capacity for effective classroom instruction.

=== Schools of the Nations ===
With modest beginnings, the School of the Nations in Macau originally operated out of an apartment with seven teachers and five students, when it was first established in 1988. As of 2023, it was offering education to over 600 students from kindergarten to high school. Over the years, the school has come to be known for providing a high standard of academic education and has received awards at both the national and international levels for its character development program.

=== Unity Foundation ===
Unity Foundation of Luxembourg is a Bahá'í-inspired organization that specializes in identifying and working with like-minded donors on behalf of agencies in Africa, Asia, and Latin America. One of the Foundation's most significant donors is the country's Ministry of Foreign Affairs. A core feature of the Foundation's approach involves respecting the independence of the development organizations with which it partners. It establishes relationships of mutual collaboration and learning in which it serves as an advocate for its partners before donors.

== Examples of Baháʼí-inspired organizations ==
- FUNDAEC, Colombia
- New Era High School, India
- Barli Development Institute for Rural Women, India
- Banani International Secondary School, Zambia
- Nur University, Bolivia
- School of the Nations, Brazil
- School of the Nations, Macau
- Townshend International School, Czech Republic
- Tahirih Justice Center, United States
- Mona Foundation, United States
- Badi Foundation, Macau

== See also ==
- Baháʼí Faith and gender equality
- Ruhi Institute
- Baháʼí radio
- Baháʼí school
- Baháʼí Faith by country
- Huqúqu'lláh
- Bahá'í International Development Organization

== Sources ==
- Arbab, Farzam; Correa, Gustavo; de Valcarcel, Francia (1988). FUNDAEC: Its Principles and Its Activities. Cali, Colombia: CELATER.
- Arbab, Farzam (1984). Rural University: Learning about Education and Development. International Development Research Centre.
- Arbab, Haleh; et al. (2024). Weaving a Fabric of Unity: Conversations on Education and Development. Center for Research in Education for Development (CRED).
- Bahá'í International Community (1984). Social and Economic Development: The Bahá'í Contribution. New York: Bahá'í International Community.
- Bahá'í International Development Organization (2023). For the Betterment of the World: The Worldwide Bahá'í Community's Approach to Social and Economic Development (PDF). Haifa, Israel: Bahá'í International Development Organization.
- Bahá'í World (2025). "A Global Community". Elements of a Global Spiritual Endeavor (1996–2021). Vol. 35 (2006–2021). Haifa, Israel: Bahá'í World Centre. pp. 108–109.
- Bahá'í World News Service (25 January 2019). "Bahá'í International Development Organization Announces Board of Directors".
- Bahá'u'lláh (2006). The Tabernacle of Unity. Haifa, Israel: Bahá'í World Centre.
- Berger, Julia; Kavelin, Nava (2020). "From Principles to Praxis: The Worldwide Bahá'í Community's Approach to Social and Economic Development". In Kraft, Kathryn; Wilkinson, Olivia J. (eds.). International Development and Local Faith Actors: Ideological and Cultural Encounters. Abingdon, UK: Routledge. pp. 31–44.
- Correa, Bita; Lample, Joseph (2025). "Knowledge for Transformation in Colombia and Uganda". Development in Transition: Rethinking Rural Futures. Pivot Press. pp. 6–7.
- Hanson, Holly (1992–1993). "An Overview of Bahá'í Social and Economic Development". The Bahá'í World. 21: 229–245.
- Honeyman, Catherine A. (2015). "Social Responsibility and Community Development: Lessons from the Sistema de Aprendizaje Tutorial in Honduras". International Journal of Educational Development. 40: 93–102.
- McEwan, Patrick J.; Murphy-Graham, Erin; Torres Irribarra, David; Aguilar, Claudia; Rápalo, Renán (2015). "Improving Middle School Quality in Poor Countries: Evidence from the Honduran Sistema de Aprendizaje Tutorial". Educational Evaluation and Policy Analysis. 37 (1): 113–137.
- Momen, Moojan (1988). Bahá'í Focus on Development. London: Bahá'í Publishing Trust.
- Murphy-Graham, Erin; Lample, Joseph; Kabay, Sarah; Nourani, Vesall (2026). "Transformative Teacher Professional Development: A Qualitative Case Study of a Metacognitive Approach to Teacher Training in Uganda". Teaching and Teacher Education. 172 105329. doi:10.1016/j.tate.2025.105329.
- School of the Nations. "History".
- Schewel, Kerilyn; Rahmanian, Sina; Nourani, Vesall (2025). "Rethinking Rural Futures: Mapping Divergent Paradigms, Logics, and Strategies for Rural Transformation". In Schewel, Kerilyn; Davis, Benjamin P.; Miller, D. Lee (eds.). Development in Transition: Rethinking Rural Futures. Pivot Press. pp. 33–36.
- Shahvar, Soli (2009). The Forgotten Schools: The Bahá'ís and Modern Education in Iran, 1899–1934. London: I.B. Tauris.
- Smith, Peter (2008). An Introduction to the Bahá'í Faith. Cambridge: Cambridge University Press. pp. 146–151.
- Universal House of Justice (9 November 2018). "Message to the Bahá'ís of the World".
