= Janak Palta McGilligan =

Indian social worker

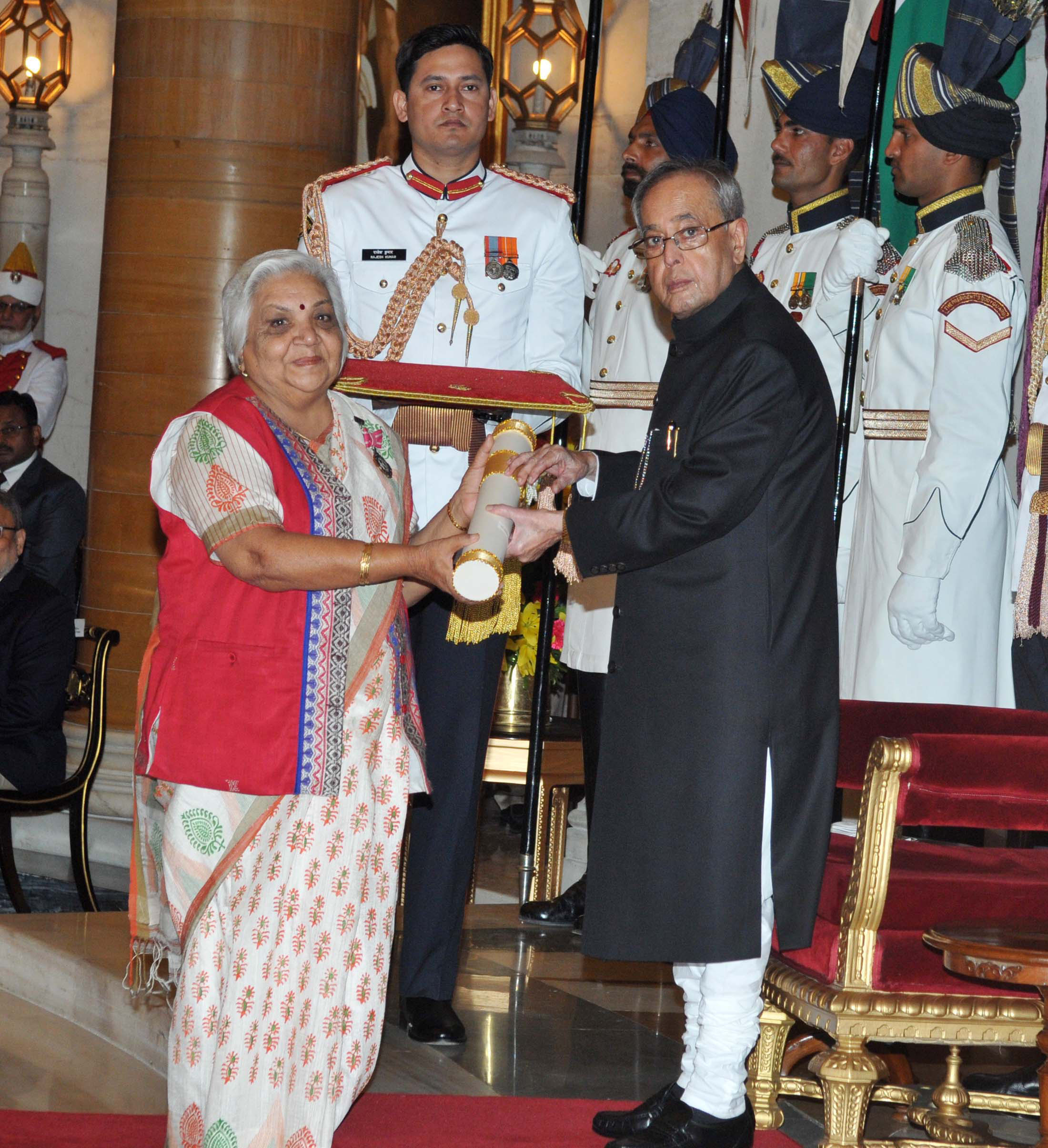
- Born: 16 February 1948 (age 78); Jalandhar, Punjab, India
- Occupation: Social workers
- Known for: Empowerment of rural and tribal women, sustainable development, solar energy and organic farming
- Spouse: James McGilligan
- Parent(s): Maya Rani Palta and Bishambar Dass Palta
- Awards: Padam Shri, Rajmata Vijyaraje Sindhyia Social Service; Manav Seva Award; Sadbhavana Samman; Paryavaran Mitra Puraskar
- Website: http://jimmymcgilligancentre.org/

Janak Palta McGilligan is an Indian Padma Shri recipient social worker and the founder-director of Jimmy McGilligan Centre For Sustainable Development, an Indore-based non governmental organisation working for sustainable community development. She is also a former founder-director of Barli Development Institute for Rural Women.

== History ==
Janak Palta McGilligan, was born in a Punjabi family and grew up in Chandigarh. She secured a master's degree (MA) in English literature, political science, Sangeet Visharad in Sitar, an MPhil in political science with distinction, and a Ph.D. During and after her studies, she worked at various places such as the Provident Fund office, at the High Court and at the Centre for Rural and Industrial Development. She married James McGilligan, an Irishman, and they served and developed Barli Development Institute for Rural Women as Baha'i pioneers.

=== Barli Development Institute for Rural Women ===
Janak Palta was director of this institute for 26 years from the day of its establishment 1 June 1985 until she took retirement on 16 April 2011.

Janak Palta McGilligan is the founder-director of the board of directors of the Barli Development Institute For Rural Women and continues to serve as one of the directors of the board of the institute.

=== Jimmy McGilligan Centre For Sustainable Development ===
She has been serving as a director of the Jimmy McGilligan Centre For Sustainable Development.

=== Other institutions ===
She is a global advisor (member of the advisory board of Solar Cookers International in Sacramento, Cal. Co-founder of Jaivik Setu in Indore.

She is an honorary secretary of Sangini Cancer Care society Indore, dedicated to breast cancer patients since 2007.

Has been member of management board of Chitrakoot University. Has also been associated with UNICEF as resource person for the National Institute of Public Cooperation and Child Development IIM Indore, IIT BHU, Prestige Institute of Management Indore, Indus World School, Choithram International School, Pragya Girls School, MGM Medical College, Indore Dental College and Hospital.

== Publications ==
Books:

McGilligan has written a book on Barli Development Institute for Rural Women. which has been published by GR Books in Oxford, London,

Curriculum

She has developed seven curriculum books:

- Health -Hindi Medium 2005
- Health - English Medium 2006
- Health - Marathi Medium 2007
- Cutting & Tailoring, Hindi Medium 2007 (based on National Institute of Open Schooling Curriculum New Delhi)
- Hindi Literacy- 2009
- Batik Printing -Hindi Medium 2010
- Vijalo, theme song book 2010: A collection of 100 folk Songs with theme based on Development in indigenous dialects along with Hindi Translation.
- Learning to Develop Myself and My Community in Hindi (unpublished)

== Recognition ==
- The Government of India in 2015 awarded her the Padma Shri, the fourth highest Indian civilian award.
- SCI Order of Excellence 2016
- Green Hero by TERRI (India)2017)
- Rajmata Vijaraje Sindhiya Social Service Award by Government of Madhya Pradesh 2008
- Manav Seva Award
- Sadbhavana Samman
- Paryavaran Mitra Puraskar

== See also ==
- National Institute of Public Cooperation and Child Development
