= Baháʼí school =

School run by the Baháʼí institutions, or inspired by the Baháʼí teachings

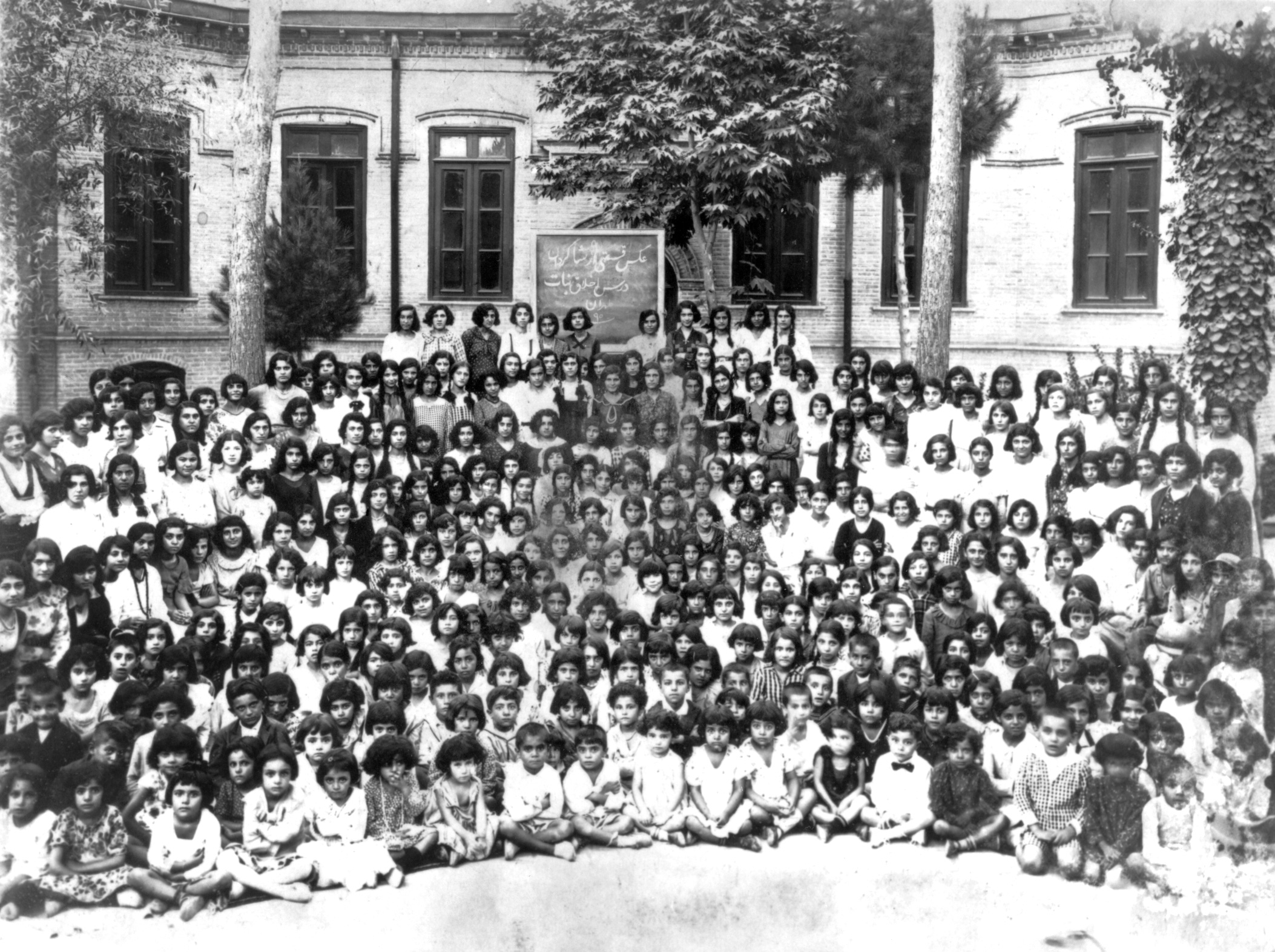
Students of School for Girls, Tehran, 13 August 1933. The school was closed by government decree in 1934. Source: History of Baháʼí Educational Efforts in Iran.

A Baháʼí school at its simplest would be a school run officially by the Baháʼí institutions in its jurisdiction and may be a local class or set of classes, normally run weekly where children get together to study about Baháʼí teachings, Baháʼí central figures, or Baháʼí administration. Baháʼí topics may be minimized in favor of a general curriculum, often with an internationalist form, with accreditation from a variety of sources.

Foremost among them is Green Acre, "paradigmatic of a Baháʼí institution", founded in 1894 for exploring religious diversity seeking unity, and the first Baháʼís appearing there in 1901. It came officially under Baháʼí management institutionally from 1916 after several years of promoting Baháʼí ideas under Sarah Farmer. As a Baháʼí institution it began to inspire other regional schools in the United States for the religion: first came Bosch Baháʼí School becoming more formally a Baháʼí school in 1927 and another in 1931 at Louhelen Baháʼí School.

Prior to 1911 a private school for girls existed in Tehran which was opened by Iranian Baháʼí women. During the Persian Constitutional Revolution situations required the close of the school. The successor Tarbiyat-i Banat (Girls' Education), established in 1911, was the most respected Bahaʼi girls' school. Founded on the efforts of private school for girls by Baháʼís, it was re-opened under the direction of an Iranian Baháʼí boys' school committee and several American Baháʼí female pioneers. Even though it catered to the Iranian Baháʼí community, Tarbiyat attracted children from non-Baháʼí families, as the curriculum was largely secular.

Other examples of Baháʼí schools include the Townshend International School in the Czech Republic, New Era High School in India or the One Planet International School in Ethiopia. Baháʼí membership is not required. In Iran, struggles with persecution of Baháʼís have led to the development of a sophisticated University-like institution (such as the Baháʼí Institute for Higher Education).

In recent decades a trend to multiply services of the community in neighbourhood children's classes has taken hold in Baháʼí communities at the urging of the Universal House of Justice. This is not meant to replace central schools but to provide spiritual education on a local basis. In some communities this has resulted in the closing of a central "Sunday school", while in others, both approaches are maintained. See Ruhi Institute.

== Baháʼí-inspired school ==
A Baháʼí-inspired school is a school run by an independent agency unaffiliated with any institution of the Baháʼí Faith but with explicit connections – such as having Baháʼís in its administrative leadership or involved in the founding of the school. While these schools often focus on general ideas from Baháʼí teachings, Baháʼí central figures, or Baháʼí administration, Baháʼí topics are minimized in favor of academic strength.

=== List of Baháʼí-inspired schools ===
- Banani International Secondary School in Zambia
- Townshend International School in the Czech Republic
- Forel International School in Slovakia
- School of the Nations in Macau
- City Montessori School in India
- The New Era High School in India
- The now-defunct Rabbani Bahá'í School in India
- The Barli Development Institute for Rural Women in India
- The now-defunct Maxwell International School in Canada
- School of the Nations (Baháʼí – Brazil).
- Nancy Campbell Academy in Stratford, Canada

== See also ==
- Socio-economic development (Baháʼí)
