= Janakpur (disambiguation) =

Janakpur (also known as Janakpurdham) is a sub-metropolitan in Dhanusa District of Nepal.

Janakpur may also refer to:

- Janakpur Airport, airport in Janakpur, Nepal
- Janakpur Road, town in Sitamarhi district, Bihar, India
- Janakpur Zone, former zone of Nepal
- Janakpur Road railway station, railway station in Sitamarhi district, Bihar, India
- Janakpur Today (daily), Nepali-language national daily newspaper, published from Janakpurdham

== See also ==
- Janakpuri (disambiguation)
- Janak (disambiguation)
- Janaka (disambiguation)
- Janaki (disambiguation)
