= Jonaki (disambiguation) =

Jonaki is a village in Poland.

Jonaki may also refer to:

- The Jonaki era in the history of Assamese literature
- Jonaki (magazine), an Indian Assamese-language magazine
- Jonaki (film), a 2019 Indian Bengali-language drama film

== See also ==
- Janaki (disambiguation)
