= Janak Prasad Humagain =

Nepali author

- जनकप्रसाद हुमागाईं
- Born: 13 October 1937; Kavrepalanchok District, Nepal
- Died: 11 February 2006 (aged 68)
- Occupation: Writer
- Spouse: Shova Devi Dahal
- Children: 5

Janak Prasad Humagain (1937-2006) (Nepali: जनकप्रसाद हुमागाईं) was a social activist and children's poet of Nepal.

== Biography ==
Janak Prasad Humagain was born on 13 October 1937 (28 Ashoj 1994 BS) in Balthali village of Kavrepalanchok District. His mother was Parwata Devi and father was Durga Prasad.

His father gave him the primary education at home. In 2008 BS (1951–1952), he joined a language school at Sorhakhutte, Kathmandu. He also took lesson from Mohan Raj Bajracharya at Jhonchhe, Kathmandu. In 2012 BS (1955–1956), he passed public service intermediate examination. In the same year, he left for Calcutta in India for his further studies. There he met an Englishman named Ray and started to work in his motor workshop in exchange for education in English on morning and evening. After a year, he returned to Kathmandu on request of his father and started to prepare for the public service intermediate exam. After two years, he passed the exam and joined as a public servant.

He started his service life from 2014 BS (1957–1958) as a low-level staff in government office. He passed the public service commission exams and joined as Bahidaar (clerk) at Malpot (land revenue) department in 2017 BS (1960–1961). After the implementation of land reforms program in 2021 BS (1964–1965)he was transferred to Land Reforms Office, where he was promoted as a Nayabsubba (officer). From 2025 BS (1968–1969), public servants were prohibited to criticize the government, so he quit his job and involved himself in social and political work. He however, rejoined the job due to the poor economic condition. He worked there till 2049 BS and retired.

In retirement life, he taught in school. He died on 11 February 2006 (28 Magh 2063 BS) due to thyroid cancer.

Humagain was married to Shova Devi Dahal in 2017 BS (1960–1961). Because it was a child marriage, he and his wife were not actually living together until the next 12 years. They had five sons.

== Social activism ==
In 2007 BS, he founded an organization called Gramniti Sudhar Kendra (meaning Rural Policy Reformation Centre). From 2015 BS (1958–1959) to 2017 BS (1960–1961), he protested against the feudal government though his songs and poems. He systematically opposed the trafficking hydrogenated oil and the Gandak River Agreement with India under his leadership though Janahit Sangh(People Welfare Association).

== Literary contribution ==
Humagain started to write poems from his teen age. His first book, a rhyme called Kishan Ko Geet (Farmer's Song) was published in 2016 BS (1959–1960). He has published 28 books. His mainstream writing career started from 2036 BS (1979–1980) which was mostly focused on children literature. He worked in close coordination with Shanta Das Manandhar, another well known chlildren writer of Nepal. He also worked as an editor for various newspapers and magazines such as Shrinkhala Monthly (2035 to 2043 BS), Baalposh Sachitra Rangeen Patrika (2036 BS), Pralesha trimonthly (2053 – 2055 BS), etc.

=== Works ===
- Kishanko Geet (Farmer's Song)(rhyme,2016 BS (1959–1960)),
- Euta Nara Lagaunu Parchha Aba (We should raise a slogan now) (short epic,2016 BS (1959–1960)),
- Nepal Aamako Satyabachan (True Words from Mother of Nepal) (short epic, 2017 BS (1960–1961)),
- Pasina (Sweat) (Collection of Poems, 2019 BS (1962–1963)),
- Dukhi Garibko Sawai (Poor's Morsel) (rhyme, 2021 BS (1964–1965)), etc.

== Awards and honours ==
- District Literature Conference, Panauti, 2019 BS (1962–1963)
- District Literature Conference, Dhading, 2023 BS (1966–1967)
- Best Children Literature Award, 2041 BS (1984–1985)
- Recognition by Education Ministry for his contribution in the development of children literature, 2046 BS (1989–1990)
- Children Welfare Award –Hitkari Guthi, Salt Trading Corporation, 2046 BS (1989–1990)
- Daanmaya Prativa Puraskar 2050 BS (1993–1994)
- Shrasta Samman, Panauti 2052 BS (1995–1996)
- Felicitated by Sahitya Sandhya, Birgunj 2053 BS (1996–1997)
- Felicitated by Pushpalal Smriti Pratisthan, 2054 BS (1997–1998)
- Sajha Children Literature Award 2058 BS (2001–2002)
- Balsahitya Prabardhan Samman
