= Bahá'í International Development Organization =

Bahá'í International Development Organization (BIDO) is an institution that was established in 2018 by the Universal House of Justice—the supreme governing body of the worldwide Bahá’í community—at the headquarters of the Baháʼí Faith in Haifa, Israel. Its primary role is to facilitate learning about social and economic development efforts unfolding across the worldwide Bahá'í community. It is overseen by a board of directors whose members are appointed for terms of five years.

== History ==
BIDO was established as the successor to the Office of Social and Economic Development (OSED), which supported Bahá'í development activities from its founding by the House of Justice in October 1983 to November 2018. It was then that BIDO was formed—after more than three decades of expanding experience in social action, during which Bahá'í-inspired initiatives developed in fields such as education, health, agriculture, women's advancement, and community development.

== Approach ==
The Bahá'í approach emphasizes that development efforts belong to local populations themselves, who have both the right and responsibility to determine the course of their own advancement. Rather than implementing projects on behalf of others, Bahá'í development initiatives seek to build capacity so that people become protagonists of their own development.

Within this context, the Bahá’í International Development Organization encourages the generation, application, and sharing of knowledge, helping individuals, communities, and institutions learn from experience and adapt insights gained in one setting to others. BIDO does not direct local development efforts but rather supports the exchange of ideas and experience among development organizations, community-based projects, and other social action initiatives, contributing to an evolving body of knowledge about social and economic development informed by Bahá'í principles. This emphasis on collective learning and capacity building has been identified by scholars as a distinguishing feature of Bahá'í development practice.

== See also ==
- Universal House of Justice
- International Teaching Centre
- Bahá’í International Community
- Socioeconomic Development and the Bahá’í Faith
