= Janakpuri (disambiguation) =

Janakpuri is a suburb in the Southwest Delhi district of Delhi, India.

Janakpuri may also refer to:

- Janakpuri (Delhi Assembly constituency), one of the 70 Vidhan Sabha constituencies of the National Capital Territory in northern India
- Janakpuri East metro station, located on the Blue Line of the Delhi Metro
- Janakpuri West metro station, an interchange station between the Blue Line and Magenta Line of the Delhi Metro
- Dabri Mor - Janakpuri South metro station, located on the Magenta Line of the Delhi Metro

== See also ==
- Janakpur (disambiguation)
- Janak (disambiguation)
- Janaka (disambiguation)
- Janaki (disambiguation)
