= Janaka (given name) =

Janaka (Sanskrit: जनक; Sinhala: ජානක) is a name primarily found in Sri Lanka. Notable people with this name include:

- Janaka is the father of Sita, the wife of Rama in the ancient Indian epic Ramayana.
- Janaka Perera, Sri Lankan politician
- Janaka Ratnayake, Sri Lankan entrepreneur
- Janaka Kumbukage, Sri Lankan actor
- Janaka Ruwanpura, professor at the University of Calgary, Canada
- Janaka Stucky, American poet
- Janaka de Silva, Sri Lankan physician
- Janaka Walgama, Sri Lankan Army officer
- Janaka Bandara Tennakoon, Sri Lankan politician
- Janaka Wakkumbura, Sri Lankan politician

== See also ==
- Janak (disambiguation)
- Janaki (disambiguation)
- Janakpur (disambiguation)
- Janakpuri (disambiguation)
- Janakan, a 2010 Indian film
