= Janaki Ballabh =

Indian sinologist (1928–2022)

- Born: 1928; Dalkoti, Almora, United Provinces, British India
- Died: 30 December 2022 (aged 93–94); Beijing, China
- Education: Delhi University
- Occupations: Author; translator; sinologist
- Spouse: Shayma Ballabh (died 2014)
- Children: 2

Janaki Ballabh (1928 – 30 December 2022) was an Indian sinologist and translator known for his work translating Chinese literature into Hindi. He spent much of his career working for the Foreign Languages Press in Beijing, and was recognised with a Peace and Friendship Award by Chinese Premier Zhou Enlai for his contributions to cultural exchange between China and India. Ballabh was the first Indian to be granted long-term residency in China, and continued to translate works into Hindi even in his retirement.

== Early life ==
Janaki Ballabh was born in the village of Dalakot in Almora, in the present-day Indian state of Uttarakhand, in 1928. He completed his Master of Arts degree in Hindi from the Delhi University.

== Career ==
Ballabh travelled to China in 1956 as a Hindi language expert, beginning a long association with the country. During his time in China, he worked for the Foreign Languages Press in Beijing, where he translated a variety of Chinese works into Hindi, including Mao Zedong's Selected Works, Journey to the West, considered one of China's four great classical novels, and the works of Chinese novelist and essayist Lu Xun.

In 1961, Ballabh was recognised with the Peace and Friendship Award by Chinese Premier Zhou Enlai for his contributions to cultural exchange between China and India. He returned to India that year, ahead of the India-China War in 1962. During this time he worked for various Indian publications before returning to China in 1982. He worked for the Foreign Languages Press and Radio China before returning to India after suffering a heart attack. He later returned to Beijing.

In his retirement, Ballabh continued to translate works into Hindi. He translated two volumes of Xi Jinping's The Governance of China. The first volume was published by the Foreign Languages Press. Ballabh was said to be the first Indian to be granted long-term residency in China, together with his wife.

== Personal life ==
Ballabh was married to Shayma Ballabh. His wife was the first Hindi announcer at Radio Beijing and was also a translator who translated a number of Chinese children's books into Hindi. She predeceased him in 2014. The couple had two sons.

Ballabh died in Beijing on 30 December 2022.
