= Janakpur Today (daily) =

- Logo of The Daily Janakpur Today
- Type: Daily newspaper
- Format: Broadsheet
- Owner: Janakpur Today Media Group
- Editor-in-chief: Brij Kumar Yadav
- Language: Nepali
- Headquarters: Bhanuchowk; Janakpurdham, Nepal
- Country: Nepal
- Circulation: 20000 plus per day
- Price: NRP 05
- Website: ejanakpurtoday.com

Janakpur Today (Nepali: जनकपुर टुडे) is a Nepali language national daily, published from Janakpurdham. It is owned by Janakpur Today Media Group. The chairman of the media group, Arun Singhaniya, was murdered in 2010, reportedly over content published by Janakpur Today.
