= National Institute of Public Cooperation and Child Development =

The National Institute of Public Cooperation and Child Development (NIPCCD) is an Indian government agency in New Delhi under the Ministry of Women and Children Development tasked with promotion of voluntary action research, training and documentation in the overall domain of women empowerment and child development in India. Established in 1966, the institute has four Regional Centres, Guwahati (1978), Bangalore (1980), Lucknow (1982), and Indore (2001). In April 1985, the Institute received the Maurice Pate Memorial Award from UNICEF in honor of "its work in developing services for children, training, research and advocacy".

== See also ==
- Women in India
- Integrated Child Development Services (ICDS)
