= Janak Raj =

Janak Raj may refer to one of the following:

- Janak Raj (politician), politician from Himachal Pradesh, India
- Janak Raj Gupta, politician from Jammu and Kashmir, India
- Janak Raj Talwar, cardiothoracic surgeon
- Janak Raj Giri, politician from Nepal
