= New Era High School =

Private co-educational international Baháʼí school in Panchgani, Maharashtra, India

- Chesson Road, Bhim Nagar Panchgani, Maharashtra, India

Information
- Type: Co-educational school
- Established: 1945
- Principal: Dr A H Mehrassa (M.Sc, B.Ed)
- Average class size: 1-12
- Language: English
- Affiliation: CBSE, IGCSE
- Website: www.nehsindia.org

The New Era High School (or NEHS) is located in Panchgani, a hill station town known as an educational centre, in the state of Maharashtra, India. It is a private co-educational international Baháʼí school, drawing students from all over the world and is under the supervision of the National Spiritual Assembly of the Baháʼís of India.

== History ==
It was founded in August 1945, and was one of the first Baháʼí education projects in India. In the 1970s and 1980s, the school setup programmes to assist the poor and underdeveloped villages in the region. It started as a service project for students and evolved into a separate institution known as the New Era Development Institute in 1987. The National Spiritual Assembly of Norway established an institution - Norwegian Agency for International Development Cooperation - and in 1988 it began a working relationship with the institute, with support for a two-year rural community development program. In 1989, funding was extended to cover a one-year community development facilitators course and short courses on agriculture, rural technology, literacy, and domestic science.

NEHS is one of the top boarding schools in India. It did have a higher secondary school (11th-12th) till 1999, but discontinued it from 2000. Class 11th and 12th have been reintroduced from 2010 and the school offers Science and Commerce fields. The shooting of the film "Taare Zameen Par" took place here. The school played host to "Amul Junior MasterChef Swaad ke Ustaad" (a cooking reality show) where the contestants prepared food for the students of the school. The show was aired on Star Plus on 26 October 2013. Prominent students include Twinkle and Rinke Khanna - daughters of the Indian actress Dimple.

The principal Dr. Mehrassa supervises the school from Canada, Mr. Kalmadi is the acting principal. The school regularly reaches district level in sports such as football, basketball and cricket.

== Site and facilities ==
The present site was moved into in 1953 and consisted of five buildings. A play field and several added dormitories in 1980s gave the school the room to add over 900 students bringing the total student population to over 1000. In the 1990s the campus went through massive infrastructure growth and renovation - gaining its own power plant, campus fencing, intercom system, phone system for students, parents and staff, three wells, solar heating for the dining hall and a large garden. Computers handle student records, accounts, maintenance, personnel, and other administrative areas as well as facilitating student-parent communication.

== Programme ==
Special attention is given to academic excellence, moral education, specifically noted by the Universal House of Justice, values for world citizenship, and social and economic development in rural areas. Subject areas significantly expanded through the 1990s to include advances across the K-12 curriculum with peace and cooperative learning programs, computer training programs and extracurricular sports clubs and educational field trips.

== Accreditation and awards ==
The school was registered with the state in 1954 and the first students took their external examinations in 1958. Gloria Faizi, Abu'l-Qásim Faizi's wife, helped bring the school onto a more financial status by providing leadership and attracting investments. The current accreditation includes the standard ten high school exam of the Central Board of Secondary Education though it is increasingly switching to Indian Certificate of Secondary Education.

The Secondary Section in 2007 received top awards for all of Panchgani (with additional high marks in specific subject areas)

- 100% passed result with average score of 73.54%
- Set a new record of highest average 94.6%
- Number of students appeared - 102
- 48 students (47%) secured Distinction (above 75%)
- 43 students (42%) secured First Class (above 60%)
- 11 students (11%) secured Second Class

The Secondary Science program won awards in 2003 (National Level Science Talent Search Examination and Best Participation Award in the NSTSE)

The Secondary Computer Science curriculum serves the International General Certificate of Secondary Education.

The Secondary Arts program can support students reaching for the annual Government of Maharashtra Elementary and Intermediate Art Exams.

All topic areas have vocational courses

The school is ranked 64th across India by a broad range of criteria.

In 2005/6, New Era High School two students ranked 857th and 1824th (over 2000 were ranked) across all Indian students competing for the Amul Shakti Vidyashree award.

=== Primary Section ===
Along with standard academic and arts subject areas, and multilingual programs begin, a featured area is values education (including Peace Education, Conflict Resolution, and Environmental Education.)

=== Secondary Section ===
In addition to the awards winning academic and arts subjects areas, most subject areas develop extension programs - poly-lingual plays, student quiz teams, and community outreach.

The computer system, especially present in the Secondary Section, is Windows 7 based systems, along with applications like NetBeans or MySQL for subjects like Informatics Practices.

== School culture ==
The school developed a residential prefect-oriented system. The prefect body consists of thirty-two students who represent four virtues - Peace, Respect, Harmony and Wisdom. One of the senior students is appointed as Head Girl or Head Boy.

== In popular culture ==
The second half of Aamir Khan's film, Taare Zameen Par was shot in the school.

== See also ==
- Baháʼí Faith in India
- Barli Vocational Institute for Rural Women in Indore
- Education in India
