= Janaki Amma =

20th and 21st-century judge of the Kerala High Court

Justice P. Janaki Amma
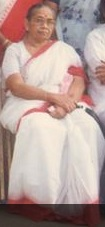
- Justice P. Janaki Amma
- Born: Janaki; 22 April 1920; Thrissur, Cochin state, British India
- Died: 29 June 2005 (aged 85); Ernakulam, Kerala
- Occupation: Judge
- Employer: Kerala High Court
- Known for: Second woman to be a Judge of High Court in India
- Title: Hon. Justice
- Term: 30 May 1974 to 22 April 1982

Justice P. Janaki Amma (1920–2005), was a former judge of the Kerala High Court. She was the second woman in India to be a judge of a High Court. She served as a judge until 22 April 1982. A lifetime spinster, she died in 2005 after a prolonged illness.

== Early life and career ==
Janaki Amma was born in a village in Thrissur district of Kerala and lived most of her life in Ernakulam. She joined the Cochin Praja Mandalam after completing her studies and later joined the Indian National Congress. She participated in the Indian independence movement from 1940 to 1944 . She was a member of the Ernalkulam Municipality from 1949 to 1953. She was the first woman municipal chairperson of Travancore-Cochin. She left active politics after joining the judicial service.

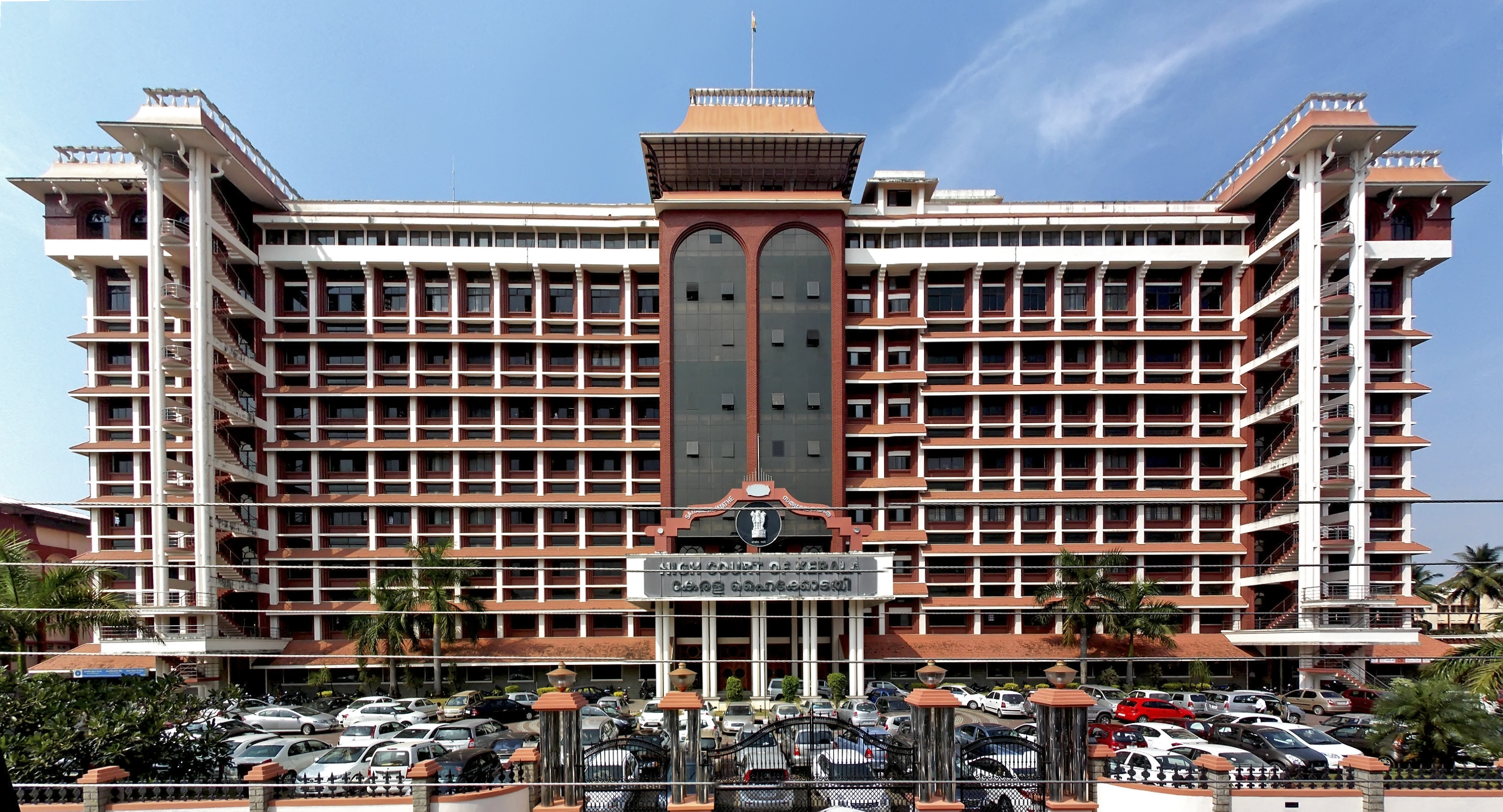
A working day view of Kerala High Court

== Judiciary ==
She started her legal career as a junior advocate to Panampilly Govinda Menon and later on served as district magistrate, district and sessions judge of Kozhikode, Tellicherry and Manjeri prior to her elevation to the High Court.

She was appointed as a judge of the Kerala High Court on 30 May 1974, becoming the second woman in India to have occupied that seat. She retired from the Kerala High Court on 22 April 1982.

== Probes and enquiry commissions ==
She continued to be very active in the judiciary field after retiring from the High Court. In 1983, she was appointed by the state government to probe the Vypeen liquor tragedy that killed several people. Based on her recommendations, the government amended section 57(A) of the Abkari Act. The section deals with the prevention of adulteration of liquor with noxious substances that could endanger human life or cause grievous hurt. Under the section, enforcement officials, if found guilty of not taking reasonable precautions to prevent adulteration of liquor with lethal substances, could face a maximum penalty of life imprisonment and fine up to Rs. 50,000.

She was engaged by the Kerala Government in other probes and enquiry commissions.

== People's Council for Social Justice (PCSJ) ==
In 1985, she became the founder president of the People's Council for Social Justice (PCSJ), an organization that was created by the initiative of Shri Justice V. R. Krishna Iyer, former Judge of the Supreme Court of India. This organization mainly focuses on the development of women, children, scheduled castes scheduled tribes and other backward sections of society to ensure social justice through legal assistance and legal education. PCSJ has extended its activity towards uplifting the living standards of the disadvantaged and make them aware of their rightful place in the society.

== Greenery in Kochi ==
She was popular for her efforts related to providing greenery in Kochi.
