= School of the Nations (Brazil) =

International school in Brazil

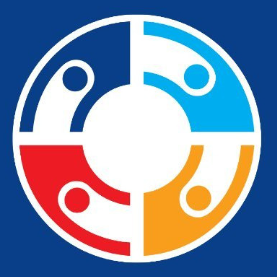
The school logo.

The School of the Nations, "Escola das Nações", is a bilingual (English- Portuguese) internationalist Baháʼí school in Lago Sul, in the Federal District, Brazil.

== History ==
The school was founded in 1980 by two North American families of educators who envisioned building a school around a new model of international education. The basis of this model was the Baháʼí teaching of "unity in diversity".

During the 1990 International Literacy Year the school cooperated with several communities on projects, one of which included sponsorship by the Secretary of Education of the Federal District.

During a special session of the Brazilian Federal Chamber of Deputies honoring the 1996 visit of Madame Mary Rabbání, a Deputy of the Social Democratic Party (Brazil) noted the school as an example of the contributions of the Baháʼí faith in "the economic and educational fields".

== Facility ==
In 2007 the school had 610 students enrolled on the two campuses: one for the Early Childhood program for students from ages 3 to 6 and the other for Elementary, Middle and High School. The school community is made up of Brazilian families, many of whom are part of diplomatic corps, as well as international families, (representing approximately 40 countries), who are connected with various embassies, multi-national companies or non-governmental organizations such as UNICEF, the World Bank and the United Nations. There are 90 teachers on the staff including assistants.
