= Walter Kolarz =

Walter Jean Kolarz (26 April 1912 - 21 July 1962) was a German-British journalist and historian of Eastern Europe. As a scholar of the communist world, he wrote widely on ethnic and religious issues.

== Life ==
Kolarz was born in Teplitz-Schonau, Kingdom of Bohemia, Austro-Hungarian Empire. His father, a spa director, was an officer in the Austro-Hungarian Army in the First World War and spent three years as a prisoner of war in Russian Central Asia. His mother was Jewish.

Kolarz studied at Charles University in Prague and worked for the publisher Orbis, where he became a Berlin correspondent in 1934. However, he was expelled by the Nazis in 1936. He moved to Paris, before fleeing to London in 1940, where he was part of a circle of Sudeten German emigrés. Kolarz worked as a journalist for United Press of America, before joining the BBC in 1949, specialising as an analyst on Soviet and East European affairs. He also traveled to Africa.

Kolarz married Alexandra Lipovsky in 1939 (she died in March 2000) and they had one son.

Kolarz died from heart disease in hospital in Kensington, London, on 21 July 1962.

A number of Kolarz' books were compiled by others in the wake of his early death.

== Books ==
- Stalin and Eternal Russia, 1944
- Myths and Realities in Eastern Europe, 1946
- Russia and Her Colonies. Frederick A. Praeger, New York. 1952 (third edition 1953)
- How Russia is Ruled, 1953
- The Peoples of the Soviet Far East, 1954, translations to German and French
- Religion in the Soviet Union, 1961
- Religion and Communism in Africa, 1963
- Communism and Colonialism, 1964, MacMillan & Co., London (series of BBC broadcast scripts edited by George Hermann Gretton)
