= Janák =

Janák (feminine Janáková) is a Czech surname. Notable people with the surname include:

- František Janák (born 1951), Czech artist
- Jiří Janák (born 1983), Czech racing driver
- Karel Janák (born 1970), Czech film director
- Mária Janák (born 1958), Hungarian javelin thrower
- Pavel Janák (1882–1956), Czech architect
