= Baháʼí Faith in India =

Indian Baháʼís
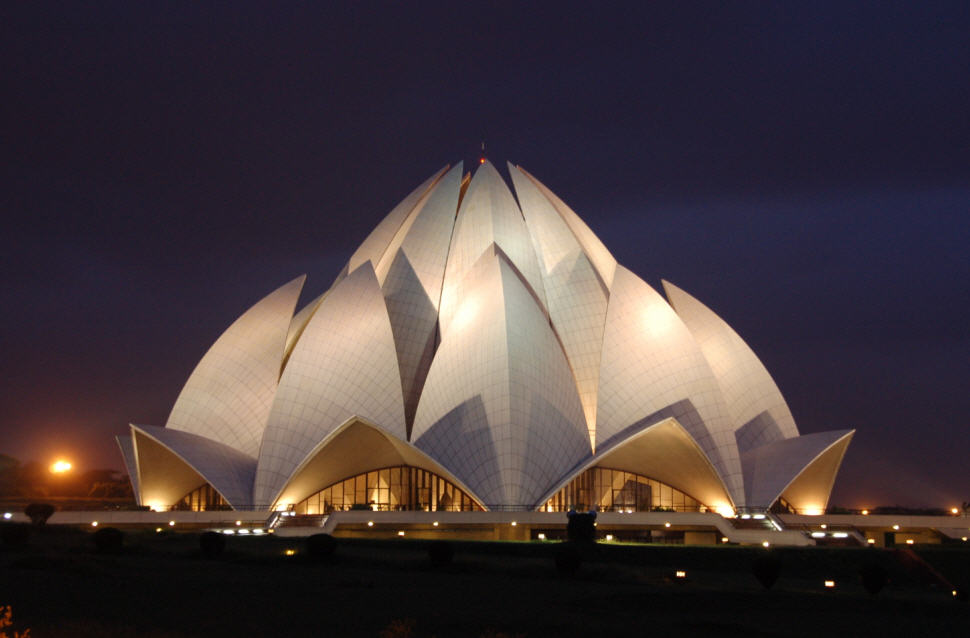
- The Baháʼí House of Worship in Delhi, commonly referred to as the Lotus Temple, has won numerous architectural awards.

Total population
- est. 1,000,000–2,000,000

The Baháʼí Faith is an independent world religion that originated in Qajar Iran in the 19th century, with an emphasis on the spiritual unity of mankind. Although it came from Islamic roots, its teachings on the unity of religion and its acknowledgement of Krishna as a divine Manifestation of God have created a bridge between religious traditions that is accepting of Hinduism.

During the lifetime of its founder, Baháʼu'lláh, several Baháʼís settled in Mumbai, and the community in India remained relatively small but active for its first 100 years. Baháʼís in India were mostly urban and of an Islamic or Zoroastrian background until teaching efforts in the 1960s gained numerous enrollments in rural areas, initially in the state of Madhya Pradesh. By the mid-1990s the Baháʼí community of India claimed a membership of 2 million, the highest of any country, though the active participation was only about 5% (100,000) in 2001, the lowest of any region. According to the Annual Report of the Baháʼí community, there were 61,650 Baháʼí core activities taking place in July 2020, with 406,000 participants.

New Delhi's Lotus Temple is a Baháʼí House of Worship that opened in 1986 and has become a major tourist attraction that draws over 2.5 million visitors a year and over 100,000 visitors a day on some Hindu holy days, making it one of the most visited attractions in the world. In 2021, construction began on a local House of Worship in Bihar Sharif.

The Indian Baháʼí community is overseen by a national Spiritual Assembly, a nine-member body elected annually at a convention of delegates. There are also elected regional and local councils that run teaching and consolidation at the state and local levels, and four appointed Baháʼí Continental Counsellors have jurisdiction over India. Baháʼí community life in India is similar to that of Baháʼís elsewhere in the world. Communal study of Baháʼí scripture is done in classes designed for children, youth, or adults. Prayer meetings, along with celebrations of Baháʼí Feasts and Holy Days, the observance of the fast and other social behavior, are all practiced to varying degrees. Baháʼí teachers in India generally approach Baháʼí practices gradually and do not require converts to abandon traditional patterns of behavior, though no distinctions based on caste are recognized.

Baháʼís in India have developed a number of educational institutions, some organized by the national Baháʼí organization, and others run by individual Baháʼís, which are known as "Baháʼí-inspired". The New Era High School is an example of the former, and the Barli Development Institute for Rural Women is an example of the latter. Other educational institutions in India are designed to teach the Baháʼí Faith directly, such as Indore Teaching Institute, which was established in 1962 during mass-teaching to help consolidate and train new Baháʼís in remote villages.

== History ==
Although the religion originated in Iran, the Baháʼí Faith recognises the Buddha and Krishna as the Manifestations of God.

=== Bábí period ===
The roots of the Baháʼí Faith in India go back to the time of the Báb in 1844. Four Babís are known from India in this earliest period. The first was Sa'id Hindi, one of the Letters of the Living. When the Báb planned to go to Hajj, he instructed Sa’id Hindi to go to the Indian subcontinent and preach the message to the people of India. The second was only known as Qahru'llah. Two other very early Bábís were Sa'in Hindi and Sayyid Basir Hindi. Additionally, four other Indians are listed among the 318 Bábís who fought at the Battle of Fort Tabarsi. There is little evidence of any contact from these early Indian Bábís back to their homeland.

=== Early Baháʼí period (1863-1892) ===
During Baháʼu'lláh's lifetime, as founder of the religion, he encouraged some of his followers to move to India, which Hájí Sayyid Mírzá and Sayyid Muhammad did. Hájí Sayyid Mahmúd also traded in Mumbai. These individuals were very successful as general merchants and commission agents but it wasn't until the 1870s that the religion spread beyond the small network of mostly Iranian expatriates in Mumbai and northern India.

Jamál Effendi, also known as Sulayman Khan, was sent by Baháʼu'lláh to India approximately 1875. He became the leading figure of teaching efforts across the subcontinent, lasting over a decade, that brought in hundreds of new Baha'is, changing the community to a more diverse and widespread group. Jamál Effendi was trained as a Sufi mystic and dressed accordingly, giving him prestige among Indian Muslims. It was during this period of travel teaching that Jamál Effendi met with Mirza Ghulam Ahmad, who, after hearing of the teachings of Baháʼu'lláh and studying Baháʼí literature made his own claim to prophethood and founded the Ahmadiyya sect. Effendi eventually settled in Burma and established a community of Baháʼís there.

Around 1882 Mírzá Ibrahím, a relative of the Báb, helped establish the world's first Baháʼí printing and publishing company in Mumbai, the Násirí Press. The Book of Certitude and The Secret of Divine Civilization were both published in 1882 using lithography. As the first place to print Baháʼí materials, India was instrumental in the distribution of key texts during this period.

=== Ministry of ʻAbdu'l-Bahá (1892-1921) ===
During the leadership of ʻAbdu'l-Bahá, the Baháʼí groups around India were active and received frequent travel teachers from the Middle East and America. The 1900s saw the conversion of several Indians outside of the predominantly Muslim and Zoroastrian backgrounds that had made up the community to that point. By 1908, there were high-functioning Baháʼí communities in Mumbai, Calcutta, Aligarh and Lahore.

During this period the community started producing literature in Urdu, in addition to English, and another effort of nationally coordinated teaching projects advanced in 1910–11.

Two notable converts during this period were Professor Pritam Singh and Narayanrao Vakil, both of whom went on to play significant leadership roles in the Indian Baháʼí community. Pritam Singh was possibly the first Sikh in India to accept the Baháʼí Faith, and the first to publish a Baháʼí weekly magazine in India. He learned of the religion from Mírzá Mahmúd soon after his graduation from the University of Calcutta in 1904. Narayenrao Vakil (aka Narayenrao Rangnath Shethji) was a high-caste Hindu, possibly the first to accept the Baháʼí Faith. Vakil was born in Nawsari and became a Baháʼí in 1909 after learning of it from Mirzá Mahram.

In December 1920 the first All-India Baháʼí convention was held in Mumbai for three days. Representatives from India's major religious communities were present as well as Baha'i delegates from throughout the country. The resolutions arrived at included the collection of funds to build a Baha'i temple, the establishment of a Baha'i school and the growth of teaching and translation work—goals reached before the end of the century (see below).

=== Shoghi Effendi (1921-1959) ===
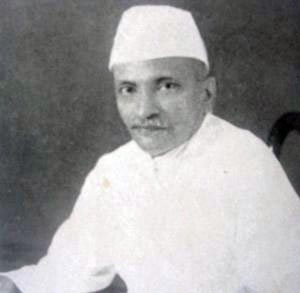
Mayor of Mumbai, Nagindas Master attended a Baha'i programme in 1944.

Following the passing of ʻAbdu'l-Bahá in 1921, Shoghi Effendi was appointed head of the religion and he soon set about organizing Baháʼí communities around the world. In 1923, the first National Spiritual Assembly of India and Burma was elected. In 1930 notable Baháʼí and world traveler Martha Root made an extensive teaching trip through India, organized teaching plans were implemented from 1938 to 1953, and the expansion of Baháʼí literature into most of the major Indian languages continued to advance.

The first Baháʼí summer school was able to be held in Simla in 1938 and in 1941 three new local communities with functioning Local Spiritual Assemblies had been established: Hyderabad, Kota and Bangalore. These activities gained occasional awareness from social leaders in India like Mahatma Gandhi.

In 1944, there were twenty-nine Local Spiritual Assemblies in India, and by 1945, there were around 2,000 Baháʼís in all of South Asia.

Through the first half of the twentieth century, the Baháʼís continued to grow with a focus away from the large cities and remained very active, but their numbers remained relatively small. By 1960 they had around 900 Baháʼís in India, with very few from Hindu backgrounds, but that changed dramatically in the 1960s.

The Baháʼí Faith had the notable achievement of the conversion of Kishan Lal Malviya, a scheduled caste leader from Shajapur (a district northeast of Ujjain), and of Dayaram Malviya, another scheduled caste leader, setting the stage for a rural dynamic of growth called "mass teaching." Shirin Fozdar also rose to prominence and served as a member of the National Spiritual Assembly of the Baháʼís of India from 1936 to 1951. Her main area of work from 1925 to 1950 was in a large community of Untouchables or Harijans in Ahmedabad.

=== Mass-teaching (1960-1991) ===
Baháʼís in South Asia were predominantly urban and of an Islamic or Zoroastrian background until the 1960s. In 1961, there were 850 Baháʼís in India, mostly urban. Various social and religious forces encouraged a broader outreach and a time of intensive missionary work, or mass teaching. The Baháʼí teachings were adapted for presentation to a clearly Hindu context familiar to the people of the countryside, using principles and language familiar to them:

- The presentation of Baháʼu'lláh as the Kalki Avatar who according to the Vishnu Purana will appear at the end of the Kali Yuga for the purpose of reestablishing an era of righteousness
- Emphasizing the figures of Buddha and Krishna as past Manifestations of God or Avatars
- References to Hindu scriptures such as the Bhagavad Gita
- The substitution of Sanskrit-based terminology for Arabic and Persian where possible (i.e., Bhagavan Baha for Baháʼu'lláh), and the incorporation in both song (bhajan) and literature of Hindu holy places, hero-figures and poetic images
- Hindi translations of Baháʼí scriptures and prayers that appeared during this period which are so heavily Sanskritized as to make it difficult to recognize their non-Hindu antecedents

Together with the teaching of the unity of humanity these approaches attracted many of the lower castes. Also, in contrast to the case of the Neo-Buddhist movement, no effort was made to denounce Hinduism. In short order most of a tiny village of some 200 people converted to the Baháʼí Faith en masse. The following year hundreds of people adopted the religion thanks to an open air conference where speeches could be heard. In two more years almost as many people converted as had been Baháʼís through regions of Madhya Pradesh, Uttar Pradesh, Andhra Pradesh and Gujarat.

During this period of growth, six conferences held in October 1967 around the world presented a viewing of a copy of the photograph of Baháʼu'lláh as part of the commemoration of the centenary of Baháʼu'lláh's writing of the Suriy-i-Mulúk (Tablet to the Kings). After a meeting in Edirne (Adrianople), Turkey, the Hands of the Cause travelled to the conferences, "each bearing the precious trust of a photograph of the Blessed Beauty [Baháʼu'lláh], which it will be the privilege of those attending the Conferences to view." Hand of the Cause Abul-Qasim Faizi conveyed this photograph to the Conference for Asia in India.

In 1986 the Baháʼís in India opened the Lotus Temple in New Delhi and pioneered regional (state) Baháʼí councils to devolve administrative work to more manageable levels.

=== Modern India (1992-present) ===
1992 was the 100th anniversary of Baha'u'llah's death, and was commemorated by the second Baháʼí World Congress in New York. The event was attended by about 30,000 Baháʼís, the largest ever gathering of Baháʼís up to that time. The event was broadcast live to eight notable centers of Baháʼís around the world, one of which was New Delhi.

== Statistics ==
Baháʼís in India
Date	Size	Source
1900	100	World Christian Encyclopedia 1982, p. 370
1954	1,000 (Note: Number is cited as "South Asia" and doesn't separate India.)	Smith 2008, p. 83
1961	850	World Christian Encyclopedia 1982, p. 371
1961	900	Smith 2008, p. 94
1963	65,000	World Christian Encyclopedia 1982, p. 371
1963	65,000	Garlington 1997
1970	730,000	World Christian Encyclopedia 1982, p. 370
1973	222,000	World Christian Encyclopedia 1982, p. 371
1973	400,000	Smith 2008, p. 94
1975	870,000	World Christian Encyclopedia 1982, p. 370
1988	1,900,000	Smith 2008, p. 83
1990	1,400,000	World Christian Encyclopedia 2001, p. 2:360
1993	2,200,000	Smith 2008, p. 94
1995	1,440,000	World Christian Encyclopedia 2001, p. 2:360
2001	1,900,000	Warburg 2006, p. 226
2005	1,880,700	ARDA 2010
2008	2,000,000	Momen 2008, pp. 154–5
2009	1,000,000	Hartz 2009, p. 10
2010	1,898,000	ARDA 2010

The question of how many Baháʼís are in India has been the source of much debate. From 1960 to 1990 the number of estimated Baháʼís went from under 1 thousand to as much as 2 million mostly poor, rural, and illiterate people from Hindu scheduled castes. Unlike other religious conversions that require a rejection of Hinduism, Baháʼí teachers were affirming of Hindu beliefs, leaving some converts to continue with Hindu traditions side by side with the Baháʼí ones, each to varying degrees. Without the need to change a convert's name, dress, or rituals, it is difficult to identify how many of the conversions were sustained and consolidated in the Baháʼí religion. The Baháʼís in India seem to have overextended themselves by accepting the large number of adherents and not having the resources to consolidate and maintain Baháʼí principles and practices among many rural villages.

Based on activity data, about 100,000 Baháʼís in India were actively practicing the religion in 2001, representing an impressive growth of 10,000% in 40 years, but the larger number of self-identifying but inactive Baháʼís remains elusive to researchers. According to the Annual Report from the National Spiritual Assembly of the Baháʼís of India, there were 61,650 Baháʼí core activities taking place in July 2020, with 406,000 participants.

On the question of whether the number of Baháʼís in India was inflated by Baháʼí authorities, sociologist Margit Warburg studied the data and concluded that it was not. She wrote:

Inactive Baha'is constitute a burden rather than a resource for the Baha'i administration... The Universal House of Justice would have to adopt the radical policy of instructing the national spiritual assemblies to remove inactive Baha'is from the membership lists, if the goal was to count only active Baha'is. I therefore conclude that the issue of inflated official membership data stems from the present practice of not expelling inactive Baha'is; the numbers are not rooted in any sinister manipulation of data.

=== Census data ===
The census of India recorded 5,574 Baháʼís in 1991, 11,324 in 2001, and 4,572 Baháʼís in 2011.

The Indian census counts Baháʼís that are from scheduled castes as Hindu. The 1971 census directions stated, "Scheduled castes can belong only to the Hindu or Sikh religions." William Garlington, who studied the Baháʼís in India, said that none of the 88 thousand converts in Madhya Pradesh in the early 1960s were counted as Baháʼís on the census of 1971, the majority of which were from scheduled castes. The World Christian Encyclopedia of 1982 and 2001 both state that Baháʼís are counted as Hindus on government censuses (though it did not specifically mention India), and not shown separately.

Professor Anil Sarwal, member of the National Spiritual Assembly of the Baháʼís of India, wrote of the 1991 census, "these figures do not reflect the true picture of the statistics of the Bahá'í community in India for various reasons. Bahá'í is included in the others category in the column of religion and many enumerators don't know about the Faith, or they tend to write religion as per the name of the person."

=== Warburg's research ===
Margit Warburg is a Danish sociologist who studied the Baháʼí faith for 25 years. She believes that the World Christian Encyclopedia is not a reliable source of data on Baháʼí membership, and she produced her own analysis of Baháʼís in regions of the world, with a focus on India, based on the number of localities, Local Spiritual Assemblies, fund contributions, and other activity data. She estimated that in 2001 there were reliably 100,000 active Baháʼís in India, representing 5% of the 1.9 million enrolled, noting that, "The number of adherents who are active participants in their local Baha'i communities, of course, will always be smaller than the number of registered Baha'is." By contrast, she found that worldwide the activity rate was 18%, and in some western countries as high as 91%.

== Houses of Worship ==
=== Lotus Temple ===
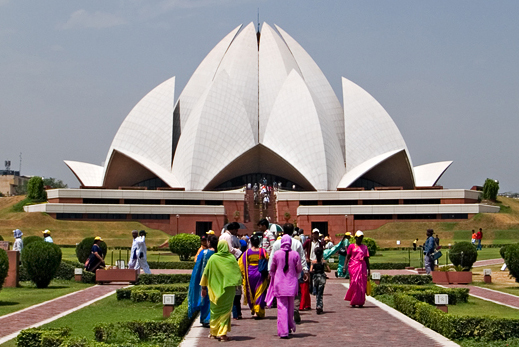
The Baháʼí House of Worship in Delhi.

The Lotus Temple, located in Delhi, is a Baháʼí House of Worship that was dedicated in December 1986. Notable for its flowerlike shape, it has become a prominent attraction in the city. Like all Baháʼí Houses of Worship, the Lotus Temple is open to all, regardless of religion or any other qualification. The building is composed of 27 free-standing marble-clad "petals" arranged in clusters of three to form nine sides, with nine doors opening onto a central hall with a height of slightly over 34.27 metres and a capacity of 2,500 people. The Lotus Temple has won numerous architectural awards and has been featured in many newspaper and magazine articles. In 2001, CNN reporter Manpreet Brar referred to it as the most visited building in the world.

=== Plans for Bihar Sharif House of Worship ===
In 2012, the Universal House of Justice announced the locations of the first local Baháʼí Houses of Worship that would be built. One of the specified locations was in Bihar Sharif, Bihar, India. In April 2020, the design for the Bihar Sharif House of Worship was unveiled. In February 2021, a groundbreaking ceremony for the temple was held. The ceremony included placing soil from villages across the state of Bihar, as a symbol of connection between all Bihari people and this House of Worship. The temple construction will include brick made of local dirt, which is meant to symbolize the integration and inclusion of its surroundings. Similar to the Lotus Temple, this temple will also have a single dome with nine geometric arches.

== Educational institutions ==
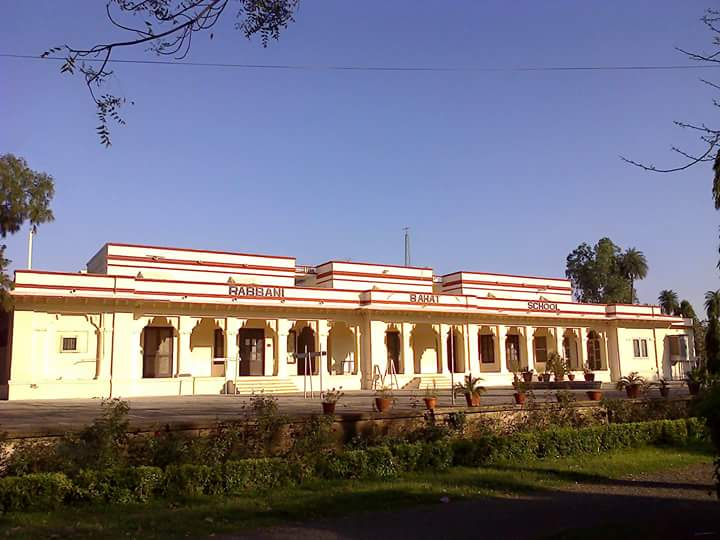
Rabbani Baháʼí School, in Gwalior, operated from 1977 to 2016.

The Baháʼís in India run several educational programs that are open to people of any religious background. Many are in rural areas that focus on the vocational development of women, teaching marketable skills such as sewing and agriculture, as well as advancement in academics, hygiene, consultation, and spiritual qualities. Some of the educational institutions integrate the Baháʼí teachings and the functioning of Baháʼí communities. The programs in India usually follow the model of training villagers in a way that they can return to their village and teach others.

Some examples are:

- The New Era High School is an internationalist Baháʼí school in Panchgani, Maharashtra state. It was founded in August 1945, and was one of the first Baháʼí education projects in India. It expanded in 1953 and has attracted a considerable number of Indians from various castes and religions, along with students from around the world. The school is under the supervision of the National Spiritual Assembly of the Baháʼís of India.
- The Barli Development Institute for Rural Women in Indore, Madhya Pradesh, is a Baháʼí-inspired educational project, independent of the Baháʼí organization of India. It offers training in agriculture, literacy, health, and nutrition for rural women, and serves as a base for outreach/non-residential training centers. It was founded in 1985 under the suggestion of the National Spiritual Assembly of the Baháʼís of India, and in 1992 it won a Global 500 Environmental Action Award. The institute was recently profiled as part of a documentary on the religion.
- The City Montessori School in Lucknow, Uttar Pradesh, is the largest private school in the world, with 20 branches offering K-12 education. It was started by a Baháʼí couple and integrates Baháʼí principles such as academic excellence, globalism, and interfaith harmony.
- The Baháʼí Academy is an institution based in Panchgani, Maharashtra state.
- The Rabbani Baháʼí School in Gwalior, Madhya Pradesh, was built in 1977. The school was closed down by the National Spiritual Assembly of the Bahá’ís of India in 2016.

== Notable events ==
=== ʻAbdu'l-Bahá's rescue ===
ʻAbdu'l-Bahá was sentenced to death by the Ottoman authorities for activities that were believed to be seditious. A British Military Intelligence Officer, Major Wellesley Tudor Pole, passed this information to the London office. Lord Balfour immediately took steps to ensure the safety and rescue of ʻAbdu'l-Bahá. All Indian Cavalry Brigade, under British imperial control, was tasked to execute the mission. The Indian soldiers consisting of the Jodhpur Lancers and the Mysore Lancers were able to rescue ʻAbdu'l-Bahá with relatively few casualties.

=== Reference by the Supreme Court ===
In 1994, the situation of the Babri Mosque was commented on by Members of the India Supreme Court highlighting the approach of the Baháʼís on multi-faith issues, quoting the statement Communal Harmony of the National Spiritual Assembly of India, which had been distributed to ministers, bureaucrats, district county workers, the superintendent of police, NGOs, and faith communities, in most of the official languages of India.

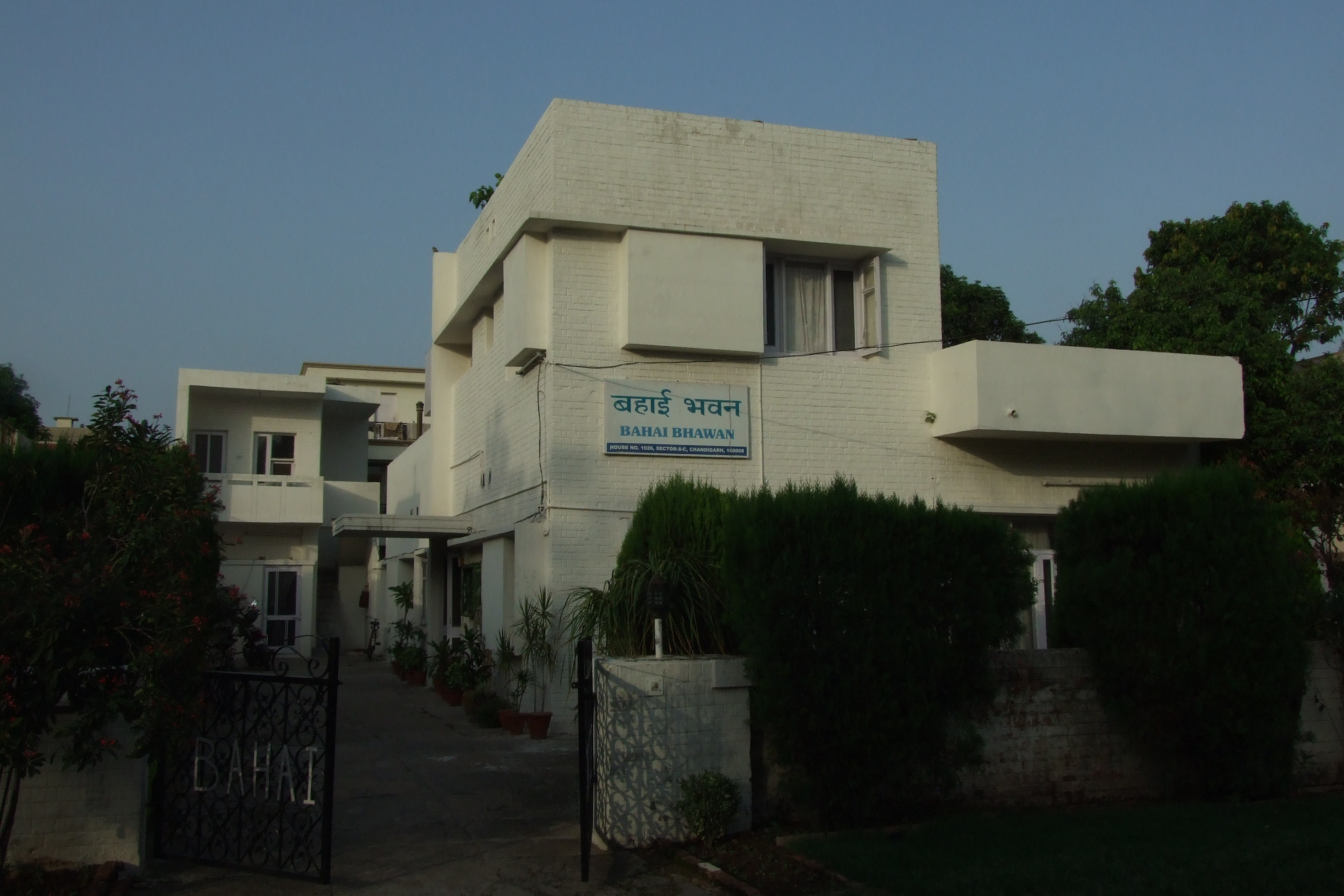
Baháʼí house in Chandigarh.

=== Lotus Temple arrests ===
In 2006, some former employees of the Lotus Temple made a complaint to the police that the trustees of the temple had been involved in various crimes including spying, religious conversion and producing false passports. The trial judge directed the police to arrest nine specific trustees, but the High Court later stayed the arrests.

=== Letters protesting persecution in Iran ===
The governments of India and Iran generally maintain good relations. In 2001, the government of India voted against the United Nations resolution Situation of Human Rights in the Islamic Republic of Iran raised in response to the persecution of Baháʼís in Iran, and it has voted against many such resolutions since that time. Despite this, many officials and prominent citizens of India have expressed serious concerns about the persecution of Baháʼís.

In June 2008 several leading jurists of India's legal system, journalists, and civil rights activist signed an open letter urging Iran to abide by international human rights conventions and calling for the immediate release of Baháʼís detained in the country. Signatories included: former Chief Justice of India Justice Jagdish Sharan Verma, former Supreme Court judge Justice V.R. Krishna Iyer, former Chief Justice of Delhi High Court Justice Rajinder Sachar, former Attorney General Soli Sorabjee, member, Law commission, Tahir Mahmood, former chairperson, National Commission for Women, Dr. Mohini Giri, editorial director, Hindustan Times, Vir Sanghvi, senior columnist Kuldip Nayar, president, World Council for Arya Samaj, Swami Agnivesh, among others.

A similar open letter was published in February 2009, and signed by more than 30 prominent Indians, including Justice Iyer, actor Aamir Khan, Maulana Khalid Rasheed, Swami Agnivesh, and many more. Calls for the release of imprisoned Baha'is have continued since that time, with many prominent Indians expressing their concern.

=== Cemetery vandalized ===
The Baháʼís of Jaipur registered a complaint (technically a First Information Report) with police that their community burial ground had been attacked by a mob of about 40–50 Hindu people "led by a sarpanch", or head of the local gram panchayat, on Friday October 31, 2015 about 11:30 AM in Shri Ram Ki Nangal village. The Hindu newspaper claimed the Sarpanch was Nathu Jangid, head of the village government, member of the right-wing Bharatiya Janata Party based on witness statement. The security guard was injured and the guard's room and prayer house were damaged. The FIR was registered by the local assembly treasurer for the Baháʼís. In a public meeting representatives of the Baháʼís stated that they believe this is the first such incident in the history of the religion in the country, named the sarpanch, and recalled that it had been theirs since 2002. The Baháʼís made no comment on the political statement then because "it is in our religion to be apolitical." Indian newspaper The Wire published pictures of the site and damage and a claim by Sarpanch Jangid that the land had been illegally sold to the Baháʼís. The People's Union for Civil Liberties of India has taken an interest in the case.

== Notable Indian Baháʼís ==
- Zia Mody is a corporate lawyer and businesswoman.
- Rehana Sultan is an Indian actress.

== See also ==
- Religion in India
- Baháʼí Faith and Hinduism
- Baháʼí Faith in Asia
- Baháʼí Faith in Pakistan
- Islam in India
  - Shia Islam in South Asia
- Zoroastrianism in India
- Indo-Persian culture
