= Refo Çapari =

Albanian politician and religious leader

Refo Çapari (1884–1944) was an Albanian politician and religious leader. Çapari was the first prefect of the Vlorë County and the first biographer of Ismail Qemali. He is considered to be the introducer of the Baháʼí Faith in Albania.

== Life ==
A member of the Çapari family, he was born in Katavothra in the Ottoman Empire (now in northwestern Greece). The Çapari family themselves have roots in Capari. In the late 1900s he graduated from the law school of Istanbul. After the Albanian Declaration of Independence Çapari became the first prefect of the Vlorë County. During World War I Refo Çapari migrated to the US, where he converted to the Baháʼí Faith in 1928.

In 1931 Capari returned to Korçë, Albania. In a letter dated 8 June 1931 he informed Shoghi Effendi of his arrival in Tirana on 28 April 1931. In the same letter he mentions that there was no Albanian Bahá’í literature available, that he had started working at the Ministry of Education and that he would start translating Bahá’í books immediately. Capari is responsible for The Hidden Words, the first known published translation of Bahá’í literature into Albanian.

In a letter to the Guardian dated 19 August 1933, Refo Çapari announced the publication in Albanian of J.E. Esslemont's book “Bahá’u’lláh and the New Era”. Dr. Howard Carpenter visited Refo Çapari in Tirana in 1932.

In May 1933, Martha Root visited Albania for the second time. On that occasion, Root met Refo Çapari, who was now married to Fiqrije Çapari, mother of two daughters from a previous marriage, namely Myrvet and Muveddat.

In 1938 he started publishing in Korçë and Tirana the Baháʼí journal The supreme plume (Albanian: Pënda siprore).

== Death ==
Refo Çapari died in Korçë in 1944.
