= Janaki Rural Municipality =

Janaki Rural Municipality may refer:

- Janaki Rural Municipality (Kailali District)
- Janaki Rural Municipality (Banke District)
