= Cambridge IT Skills Diploma =

The Cambridge IT Skills Diploma is a certificate qualification designed to assess core IT skills using Microsoft Office software. It covers a broad range of essential skills relevant to everyday computer use and is available at two levels: Foundation and Standard.

The diploma covers skills such as file and system management, and tasks like editing documents, managing data, sending emails, and creating slideshows.

== Exam methodology ==
The examinations are online-based and consist of two levels from which the candidate can choose. Standard and Foundation assessments are computer-based and available on-demand throughout the year.

== Diploma modules ==
The program's modules cover the following topics:

- Introduction to IT
- PC usage and managing files
- Word processing, Spreadsheets, Presentations and Databases using Microsoft Office
- Electronic communication using Microsoft Internet Explorer

== Diploma types ==
The name of the certificate awarded to the successful candidate is the "Cambridge International Diploma in IT Skills".

There are four types of diploma:

- Single-Module Diploma, the basic requirement for which is any of the seven applications
- Four-Module Diploma, the basic requirements for which are Introduction to IT, Windows, Word and Electronic Communication
- Five-Module Diploma, the basic requirements for which are Windows, Word, Excel, (Access or PowerPoint) and Internet communication
- Seven-Module Diploma, the basic requirements for which are Introduction to IT, Windows, Microsoft Office and Internet communication

== Recognition and accreditation ==
The Cambridge Diploma in IT Skills has been recognized by professional bodies and international organizations, including the governments of Jordan, Kuwait, Bahrain, Lebanon, and the United Arab Emirates, as well as the United Nations Educational, Scientific and Cultural Organization (UNESCO) and the United Nations Relief and Works Agency (UNRWA).
