= Banani International Secondary School =

- Chisamba; Zambia

Information
- Type: Private, boarding, girls' school
- Motto: Let your vision be world embracing, rather than confined to your own self.
- Established: 1993
- Authority: Zambia Ministry of Education and CIE
- Grades: 8-12
- Enrollment: > 160 pupils
- Language: English
- Colors: Azure, white and black
- Affiliation: Baháʼí Faith

Banani International Secondary School is a residential international girls' secondary school (grades 8–12) in Chisamba, Zambia. The nearest village is Liteta. It is a non-profit institution and follows the principles of the Baháʼí Faith. It was inaugurated by the William Mmutle Masetlha Foundation under the direction of the National Spiritual Assembly of the Baháʼís of Zambia and named after Hand of the Cause Musa Banani.

Banani International Secondary School was ranked 93rd out of the top 100 best high schools in Africa by Africa Almanac in 2003, based upon quality of education, student engagement, strength and activities of alumni, school profile, internet and news visibility.

== School motto ==
"Let your vision be world embracing, rather than confined to your own self." Baháʼu'lláh (Tablets of Baháʼu'lláh, p. 87)

== History ==
Planning began in 1987 for the school, and construction began in 1990. The school opened with 65 students in 1993. It was inaugurated in 1996 with over 100 students, by the Minister of Education, Hon. A. Hambayi, in conjunction with officers of the Baháʼí International Community like Kiser Barnes, Firaydoun Javaheri and others including supporters from Austria and South Africa.

There are efforts to expand student population from the area for "day" students for the secondary, as well as a beginning of a primary school.

== Facilities ==
Instructional areas include eight classrooms, a science laboratory, a 30-station computer lab, agricultural areas, and library.

The dormitories hold up to 200 students, with a senior commons (theater and recording studio), play fields, swimming pool, and a campus store. There are facilities for sport.

== Programme ==
Courses offered include:

- Additional Mathematics
- Agriculture
- Biology
- Personality Development
- Chemistry
- English
- French
- Geography
- History
- Mathematics
- Physics
- World Religions
- Accounts
- Business Studies
- Physical Education
- Computer Studies
- Information Technology

Most courses come in two forms - "core" for average students, and "supplemental" for advanced students. The school offers Junior youth groups where students are placed into different groups to discuss their lives. Each group is run by an animator who is a girl in senior grades and the other members are junior girls.

== Accreditation and awards ==
The Zambian Ministry of Education syllabus is used for grades 8 and 9, who then write the junior secondary school leaving exams at the end of grade 9. Grade 10 is a preparatory year and introduction to the grade 11-12 University of Cambridge syllabus which provides students with an International General Certificate of Secondary Education or the more advanced Cambridge IT Skills Diploma.

The website African Almanac has reviewed schools in Africa and posted a Top 100 Schools and lists the Banani School as the #93 secondary school for 2003.

There is an annual conference of primary school teachers at the school coordinated by Independent School Association of Zambia (ISAZ)

== School culture ==
Students wear uniforms all week excluding the weekend. They attend Baháʼí devotions every Monday and Friday. The students are mostly Zambian but there are some who live in other countries. The staff varies in nationality and includes Canadians, Zambians, Congolese, Ugandans, and Americans.
