= Sorhakhutte =

Place in Kathmandu, Nepal

Sorhakhutte सोह्रखुट्टे
- Neighborhood in Kathmandu
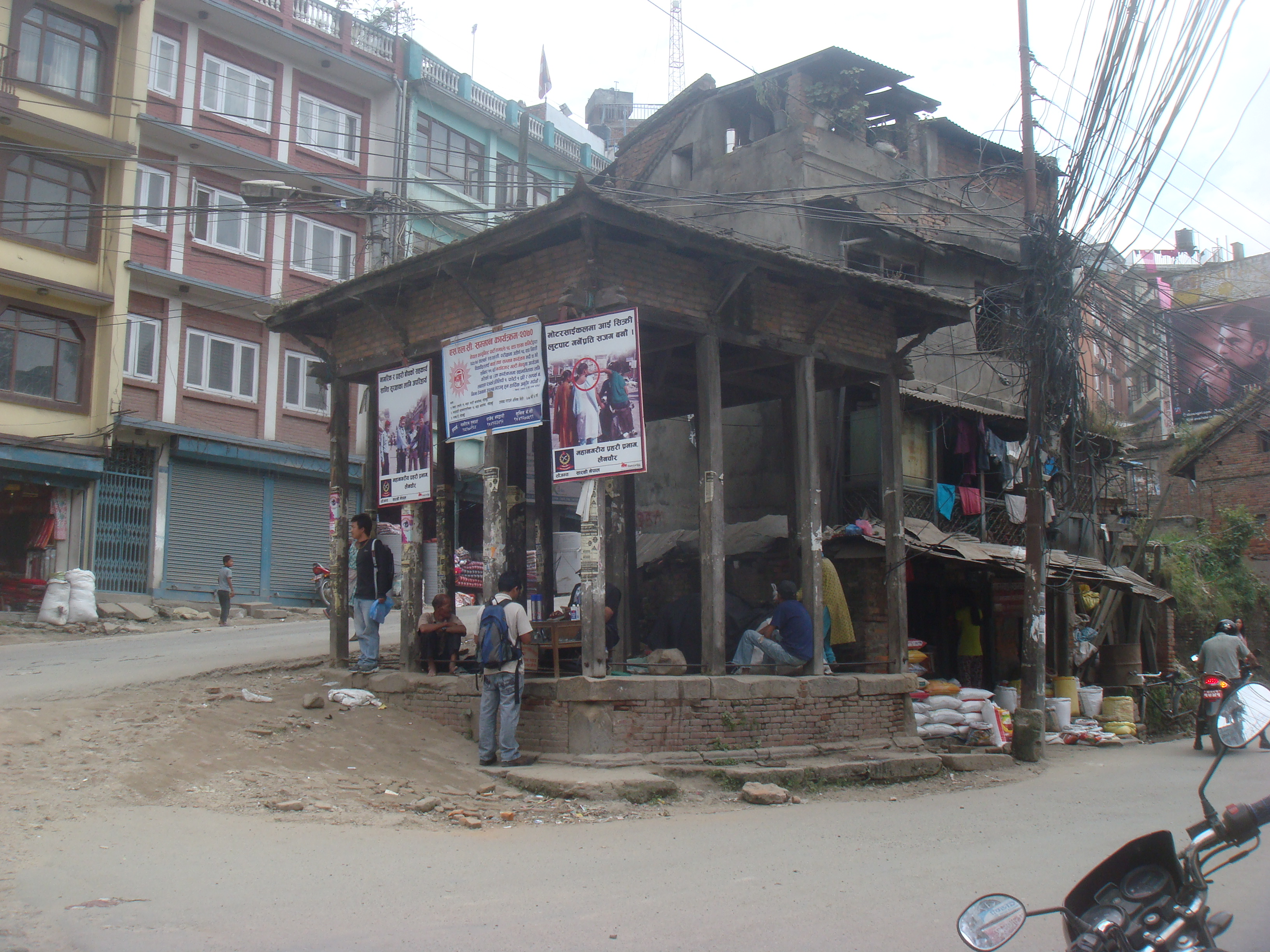

Sorhakhutte (Nepali: सोह्रखुट्टे) is a settlement at the old part of Kathmandu city lying at an intersection of Thamel, Swayambhunath and Balaju.

The intersection houses an ancient inn named Sorakhutte Paati (सोर्हखुट्टे पाटी) which was built by children of Kaji Damodar Pande about 200 years ago. It was damaged due to road expansion in 2015, and is under repair. The intersection is named after this inn based on its 16 wooden pillars. Historically, the place was an important location for the trans Himalayan Kathmandu-Nuwakot-Kerung trading route.
