= Townshend International School =

School in the Czech Republic

Coordinates: 49°2′59.63″N 14°27′10.35″E

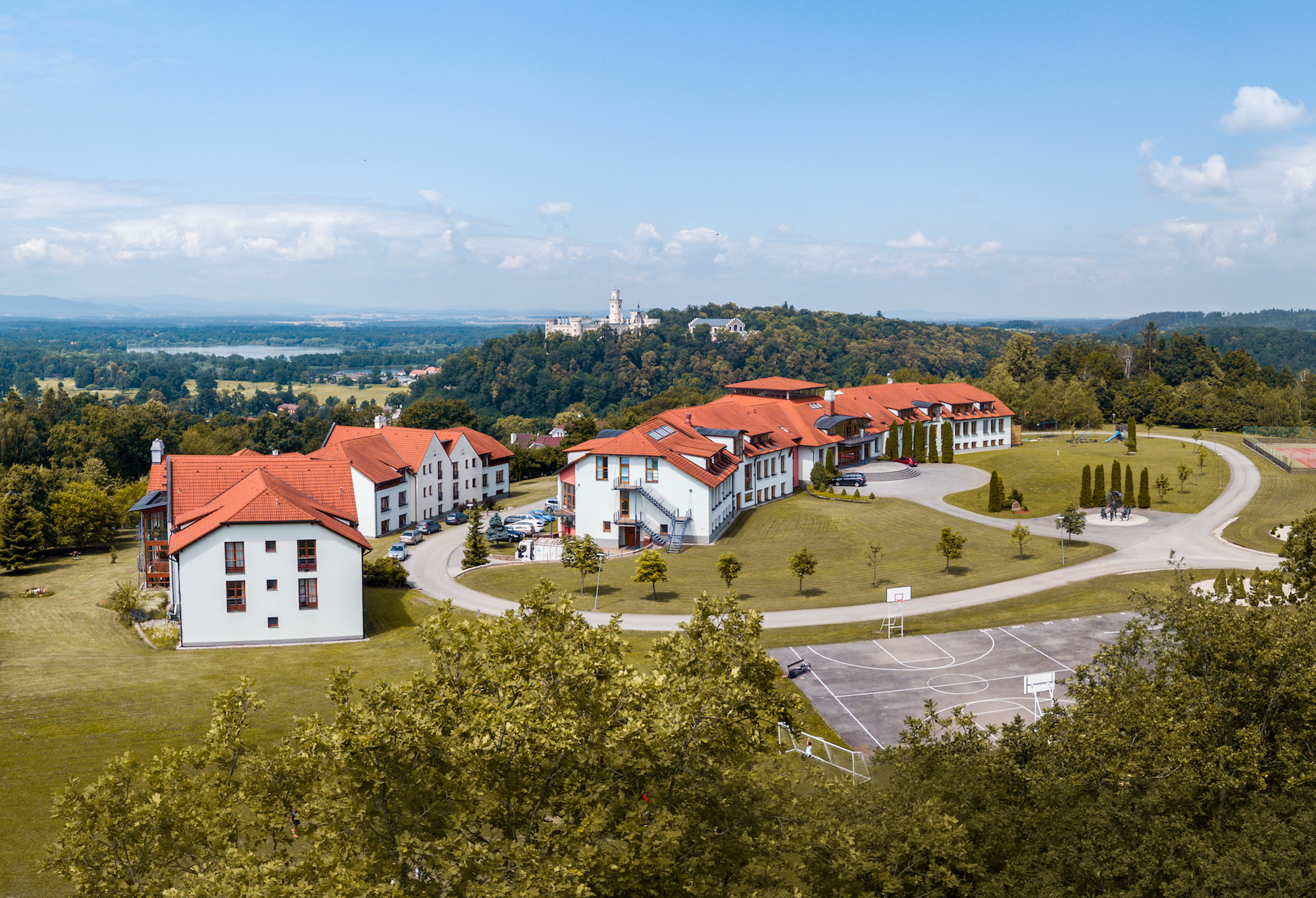

Location
- 1070 Hradčany, 37341, Hluboká nad Vltavou; Hluboká nad Vltavou, Czech Republic

Information
- Founded: September 1992
- Grades: Pre-K to Secondary
- Language: English
- Accreditation: Cambridge Assessment International Education
- Website: https://www.townshend.cz

Townshend International School is a private, Baháʼí-inspired International school located in Hluboká nad Vltavou in the Czech Republic. Founded in 1992, the school draws some 140 students from approximately 30 countries each year. The school uses the Cambridge curriculum at all grade levels from Kindergarten through secondary school, and is recognised as a Cambridge International Examination Centre. The school is named after the Irish scholar and humanist George Townshend, who was a Hand of the Cause of God in the Baháʼí Faith.

Boarding students reside in either one of the two dormitories.

== Academics ==
The school starts at pre-kindergarten and continues through high school. The school's curriculum follows the Cambridge International Examinations, and it is recognized as a Cambridge International Examination Centre. The language of instruction at Townshend is English.

The school features a primary school program which includes a kindergarten, and lower, middle and upper primary classes. The Cambridge Curriculum continues on through the lower secondary school grades 7, 8 and 9.

Grades 10 to 13 are referred to as Levels I to IV. Cambridge qualifications are received after successfully passing Cambridge examinations at various grade levels: At the end of Level II, students take examinations for the IGCSE (International General Certificate of Secondary Education). At the end of Level III, students sit the International AS Level (Advanced Subsidiary) examinations, and at the end of Level IV, the International A Level (Advanced Level) examinations.

Students use Cambridge International AS and A Levels to gain admission to leading universities worldwide, including Germany, Ireland, USA, Canada, Australia, New Zealand, India, Singapore, South Africa, the Netherlands, Spain and the UK.

The range of Cambridge subjects includes standard sciences, humanities, and arts. In addition to the Cambridge courses, Townshend supplements the curriculum to provide courses that broaden student perspectives and address the social, spiritual, and physical aspects of education.

== Campus ==
The Townshend Campus is situated on a hilltop overlooking Hluboká castle. The campus includes a main school building and two dormitory buildings, each accommodating approximately 50 people. Outdoor facilities include basketball and tennis courts, a football pitch, outdoor playground and gardening areas.

== Events ==
- The school hosted the fifth international Conference of the International Environment Forum, which included a speech by Professor Bedrich Moldan of Charles University, who is a former Czech Minister of Environment.
- Baháʼí International Youth Conference in late 2003, had speakers like Robert Henderson, Lesley Taherzadeh (wife of Adib Taherzadeh), Bijan Khadem-Missagh, and Inder Manocha.
- The school hosted the 2007 "The 6th Annual Changing Times" forum with Mark Bamford, Hooper Dunbar, and others.
- The school hosted the 2008 "World Peace Programme" featuring a certificate course with Prof. Suheil Bushrui and Prof. James Malarkey.
