= Barli Development Institute for Rural Women =

Indian non-governmental organization

The Barli Development Institute for Rural Women in Indore is a Baháʼí inspired, though independent residential vocational education school providing programs for women in the vicinity of the city of Indore, India, in the state of Madhya Pradesh as well as a base for outreach/non-residential training centers.

== History ==
The institute was founded in 1985 and was under the suggestion and direction of the National Spiritual Assembly of the Baháʼís of India. The word "Barli" denotes the central pillar which supports the tribal house typical of those areas, highlighting the belief of the institute that women are the central pillars of society. On September 11, 2001, the institute registered as an independent NGO and dropped the name Baha'i from its formal name. In 2004 the institute began developing regional satellite training non-residential opportunities.

== Awards/certifications ==
Through June 1996, a total of 769 rural tribal women have been trained at the institute with a variety of measures of successful impact on the lives of graduates including:

- 45% of them established small businesses,
- 62% are functionally literate or semi-literate (which has motivated people to send their children to school),
- 42% have started growing vegetables,
- 97% are using safe drinking water,
- all the former trainees and many of their male relatives have given up drinking alcohol,
- caste prejudices have been eliminated.

In contrast, in 1994, only 92 of every 1000 tribal girls were literate; only 3 in every 1000 made it as far as middle school; and just 1 in every 1000 actually completed her secondary schooling.

Further:

- In 1990, two of its (formerly illiterate) trainees won first prize in a Learner's Song Competition sponsored by UNESCO.
- In 1990, the literacy methodology used at the institute was adopted by the University of Leicester, U.K.
- In 1992, UNEP conferred the institute with the Global 500 Roll of Honour for outstanding environmental achievements in helping to eradicate guinea worm from 302 villages in Jhabua district in educating and training women and villagers. "...now the district is completely free of Guinea Worms."
- In 1994, the institute is listed in UNESCO's INNOV database as one of 81 successful basic education projects in developing countries.
- Since 1990, the institute has been a placement agency for eight Master of Social Work students from the Indore School of Social Work.

Graduates receive a certificate through the National Open School program.

== Programmes ==
The institute offers a variety of classes arranged around six-month and one year residential programs at its 6-acre (24,000 m^{2}) facilities and three months non-residential at the satellite outreach centers. Programmes include family life skills, environmental education and gardening, literacy in Hindi, public health, and vocational education; some subjects are taught directly and some holistically. Since 1998 the institute has helped provide and train students to use large solar ovens. There are also "train the trainer" type programs and refresher courses for area coordinators.

Many former graduates work approximately 100 days each year on field visits to conduct awareness raising programmes, recruit women for courses, do surveys and research, and to assist the former trainees to organize women's committees.

== See also ==
- Baháʼí Faith and gender equality
- New Era High School
- Education in India
- Baháʼí Faith in India
