= List of Baháʼí Houses of Worship =

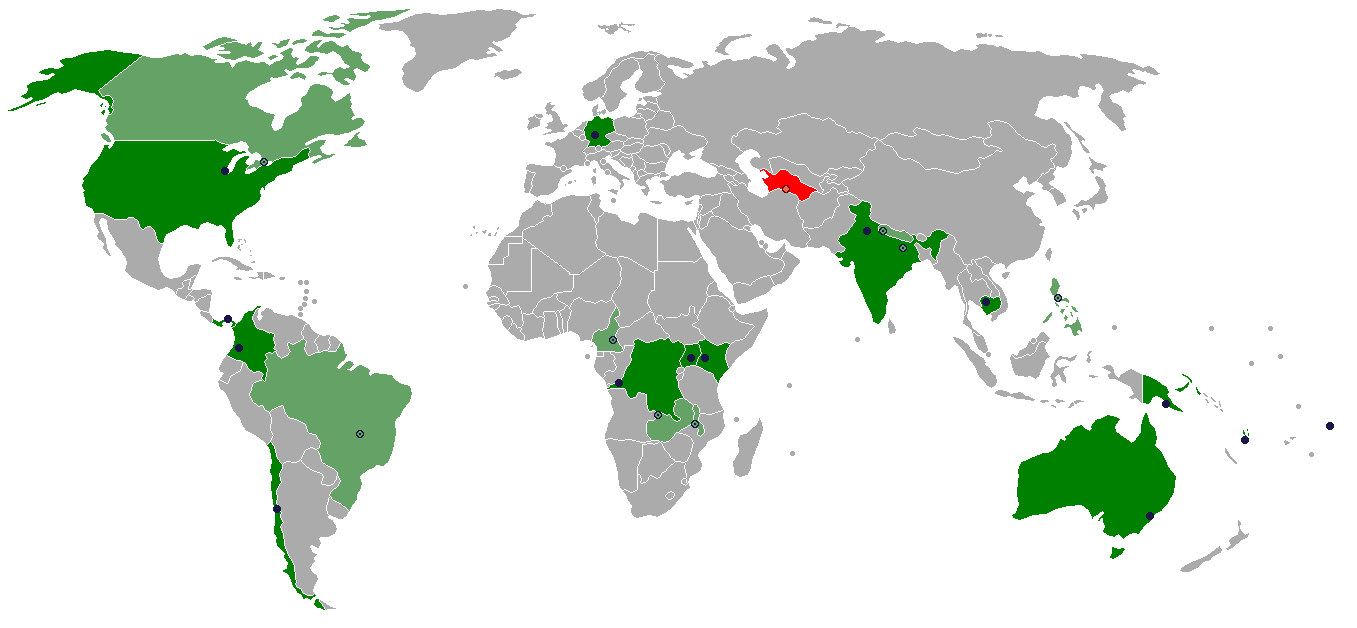
A map of the location of Baháʼí Houses of Worship throughout the world: green represents countries that currently have Baháʼí Houses of Worship (with a black dot for the city); light green represents countries where Baháʼí Houses of Worship are planned or under construction; and red represents countries where a Baháʼí House of Worship previously existed.

The following list is an overview of Baháʼí Houses of Worship (Mashriqu'l-Adhkár) throughout the world that have been constructed, are currently under construction, or are in the planning phases.

# (by opening date)	Type	Region	Country	City	Image	Foundation (stone) laid / Groundbreaking	Completion / Dedication	Architect(s)	Seating	Height (in meters, approximately)	Dependencies	Comments
1.	Local	Central Asia	Turkmenistan	Ishqabad (Ashkabad)		1902	1919	Ustad Ali-Akbar-i-Banna			A school for boys (completed in 1897), a school for girls (completed in 1907), a travellers' hostel, a medical dispensary, a library and a public reading room.	Demolished in 1963 after 1948 earthquake
2.	Mother Temple of the West	North America	United States	Wilmette		1912	1953	Louis Bourgeois	1200	42	Home for the aged (1959 until 2002)	
3.	Mother Temple of Africa	Africa	Uganda	Kampala		1958	1961	Charles Mason Remey	400	38		
4.	Mother Temple of the Antipodes	Australasia	Australia	Sydney		1958	1961	Charles Mason Remey	600	40		
5.	Mother Temple of Europe	Europe	Germany	Langenhain		1960	1964	Teuto Rocholl	600	26.5	Home for the aged	
6.	Mother Temple of Latin America	Latin America	Panama	Panama City		1967	1972	Peter Tillotson	550	27		
7.	Mother Temple of the Pacific	Pacific	Samoa	Apia		1979	1984	Husayn Amanat (Hossein Amanat)	700	27.5		
8.	Mother Temple of the Indian Subcontinent (Lotus Temple)	Asia	India	New Delhi		1977	1986	Fariburz Sahba	1300	34		
9.	Mother Temple of South America	South America	Chile	Santiago		2010	2016	Siamak Hariri	600	30		
10.	Local	Asia	Cambodia	Battambang		2015	2017	Tang Sochet Vitou	200-250	19		
11.	Local	South America	Colombia	Villa Rica, Cauca		2016	2018	Gutierrez Chacón	250	18		
12.	Local	Africa	Kenya	Matunda Soy		2019	2021	Neda Samimi	250	17.5		
13.	Local	Pacific	Vanuatu	Tanna		2019	2021	Ashkan Mostaghim	250	14		
14.	National	Africa	Democratic Republic of the Congo	Kinshasa		2020 (design)	2023	Wolff Architects	500-700	30		
15.	National	Asia	Papua New Guinea	Port Moresby		2019	2024	Henry Lape, Saeed Granfar	350	16.5		
16.	Local	Asia	India	Bihar Sharif		2021		Moulshri Joshi, Amritha Ballal, and Suditya Sinha	500	15.5		
17.	Local	Asia	Nepal	Kanchanpur		2023 (announcement)		Sarosh Pradhan & Associates				
18.	Local	Africa	Zambia	Mwinilunga		2023 (announcement)						
19.	National	North America	Canada	Markham		2023 (announcement)		James Jing Yi Jiang				
20.	National	South America	Brazil	Brasília		2024 (announcement)						
21.	National	Africa	Malawi	Lilongwe		2024 (announcement)						
22.	Local	Africa	Cameroon	Batouri		2024 (announcement)		Nde Forcob Architects				
23.	National	Asia	Philippines	Manila		2025 (announcement)						
