= Baháʼí House of Worship =

Place of worship in the Baháʼí faith

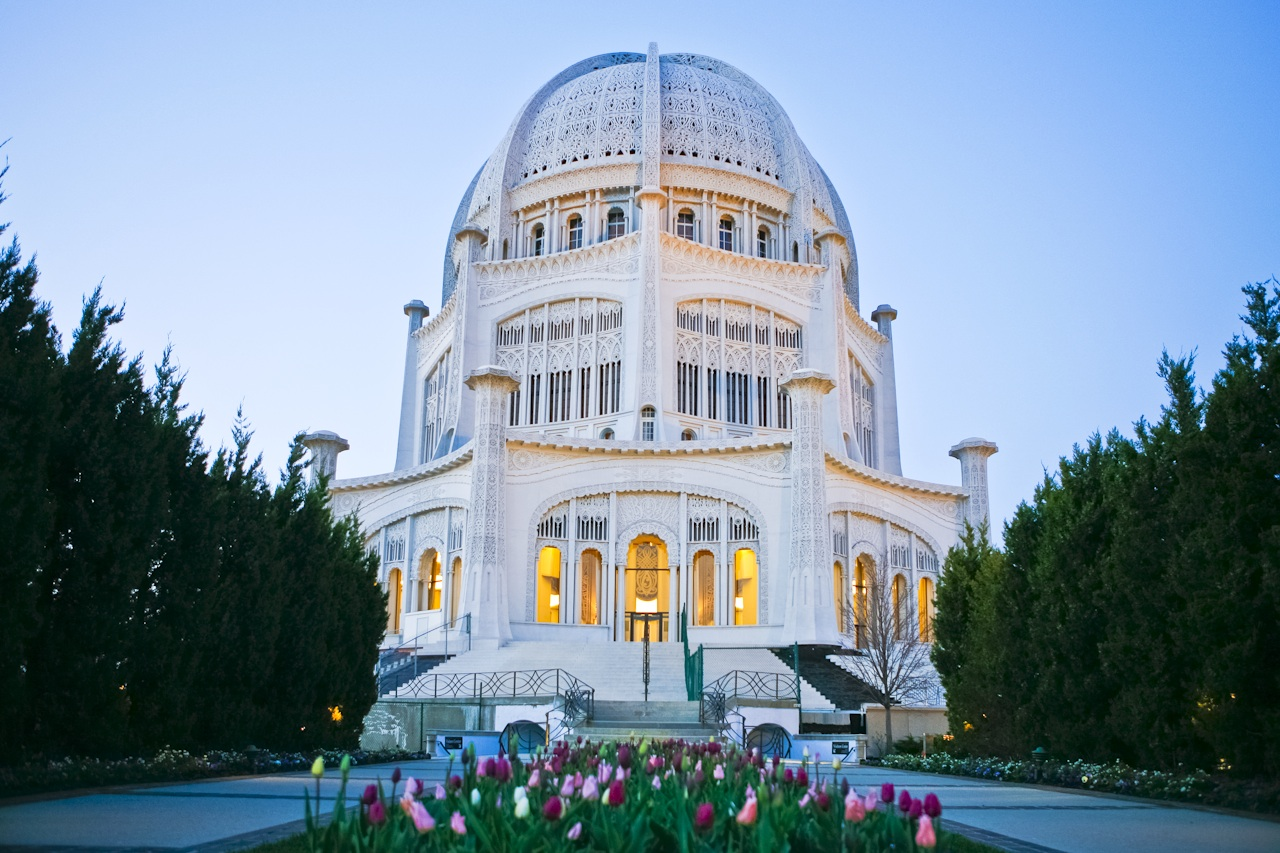
The Baháʼí House of Worship in Wilmette, Illinois

A Baháʼí House of Worship, or Baháʼí temple, is a place of worship in the Baháʼí Faith. It is also referred to as Mashriqu'l-Adhkár (Arabic: "Dawning-place of the remembrances of God").

Each House of Worship features a nine-sided design surrounded by nine gardens and pathways, reflecting the symbolic significance of the number nine, which Baháʼís associate with unity and completeness. The interior comprises a prayer hall in which the seats face the direction of the Shrine of Baháʼu'lláh. Houses of Worship are open throughout the week to both Baháʼís and non-Baháʼís for prayer and reflection, with some having scheduled weekly devotional services. While scriptural texts from any religion may be recited or chanted, the temples prohibit sermons, ritual ceremonies, and the reading of non-scriptural texts. In addition, several Houses of Worship have formed choirs which sing music based on the Baháʼí writings. At present, most Baháʼí devotional meetings occur in individuals' homes or local Baháʼí centres rather than in Houses of Worship.

== History ==
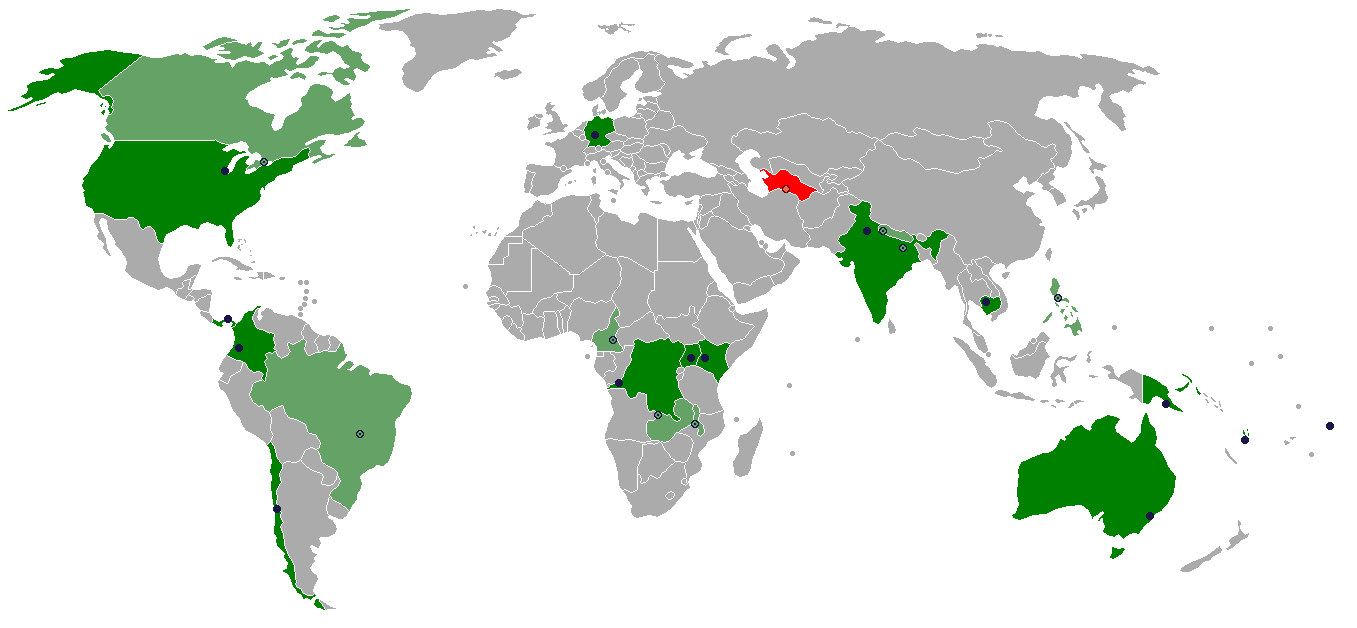
A map of the location of Baháʼí Houses of Worship worldwide as of 2025; dark green represents countries that currently have a House of Worship, red represents countries where a House of Worship once existed but no longer does, and light green represents countries where a House of Worship is planned or under construction; black dots indicate the location of completed Houses of Worship, while hollow black dots indicate the location of Houses of Worship that are planned or under construction.

The Baháʼí House of Worship was first mentioned under the name Mashriqu'l-Adhkár (مشرق اﻻذكار; Arabic for "Dawning-place of the remembrance of God") in the Kitáb-i-Aqdas, the book of laws of Baháʼu'lláh, founder of the Baháʼí Faith. (Note: Baháʼu'lláh used the term Mashriqu'l-Adhkár to refer to any building where people gathered to worship. His successor, ʻAbdu'l-Bahá, continued this general usage of the term but also described a more specific type of building using the same term, which for instance he said must be round and nine-sided. ʻAbdu'l-Bahá's successor, Shoghi Effendi, wrote that the term Mashriqu'l-Adhkár should apply only to this latter, more specific type of building, and that the Baháʼí centres used in most Baháʼí communities should be known instead as Haziratu'l-Quds. Since then, Shoghi Effendi's more specific meaning of Mashriqu'l-Adhkár has persisted, and it is buildings of this type that are known in English as Baháʼí Houses of Worship or Baháʼí temples.) Baháʼu'lláh wrote:

O people of the world! Build ye houses of worship throughout the lands in the name of Him Who is the Lord of all religions. Make them as perfect as is possible in the world of being, and adorn them with that which befitteth them, not with images and effigies. Then, with radiance and joy, celebrate therein the praise of your Lord, the Most Compassionate.

The first Baháʼí House of Worship, in what is now Turkmenistan, was planned during the lifetime of Baháʼu'lláh and then designed and constructed in Ashgabat during the ministry of his son and successor, ʻAbdu'l-Bahá. The Temple was designed by Ustad 'Ali-Akbar Banna during a visit to Abdu'I-Baha in 'Akka in 1893, with construction beginning in 1902 and the official inauguration taking place in 1919; a pilgrim house as well as schools for girls and boys were also built. In 1928, as a result of the Russian Revolution in 1917, a new law was passed requisitioning religious buildings, and although the Baháʼí community was permitted to use the Mashriqu'l-Adhkár as a House of Worship until 1938, it was then confiscated completely and converted into an art gallery. It was badly damaged by an earthquake in 1948, and demolished in 1963 due to further deterioration.

The first Baháʼí House of Worship still in existence is in the United States; when news reached the Baháʼí community in North America of the construction of the House of Worship in Ashgabat, the Baháʼís of Chicago successfully petitioned ʻAbdu’l-Bahá in 1903 for the House of Worship to be built there. The cornerstone was laid by ʻAbdu’l-Bahá on 1 May 1912 during his journey to North America, and the building was dedicated in 1953 during the ministry of his grandson and successor, Shoghi Effendi.^{[3]}

Following the completion of the temple in North America, Shoghi Effendi announced plans for a multiplication of continental Mashriqu’l-Adhkárs which would be referred to as "Mother temples" or continental temples, and intended as the first of many temples in their regions. Although Shoghi Effendi died in 1957 his plans for the construction of Baháʼí Houses of Worship were continued by the Universal House of Justice, a body which was first elected in 1963 has led the world Baháʼí community since that time. The Universal House of Justice has included constructing Houses of Worship in the goals of some of its teaching plans. By the end of the twentieth century, further continental Houses of Worship were completed in Uganda, Australia, Germany, Panama, Samoa, and India. In 2001, the Universal House of Justice wrote in its Ridván Message to the Baháʼís of the world that "with profound thankfulness and joy ... we announce at this auspicious moment the decision to proceed" with the construction in Chile of the eighth and final continental House of Worship. It was completed in 2016.

Meanwhile, in the Ridván message of 2012, the Universal House of Justice announced the locations for the first local and national Baháʼí Houses of Worship. The first two national Houses of Worship were planned for the Democratic Republic of the Congo and Papua New Guinea, with the first five local Houses of Worship situated in Cambodia, India, Kenya, Colombia, and Vanuatu. Since the announcement, the two national Houses of Worship and four of the local Houses of Worship have been completed, and there has been a groundbreaking ceremony for the fifth local House of Worship. In addition, more than 120 national Baháʼí communities have now acquired properties for the eventual construction of Baháʼí Houses of Worship, compared to 84 national communities that had done so by 1988. Plans are currently underway for national Houses of Worship in Brazil, Canada, Malawi, and the Philippines, with local Houses of Worship under construction in Batouri, Cameroon; Bihar Sharif, India; Kanchanpur, Nepal; and Mwinilunga, Zambia.

== Architecture ==
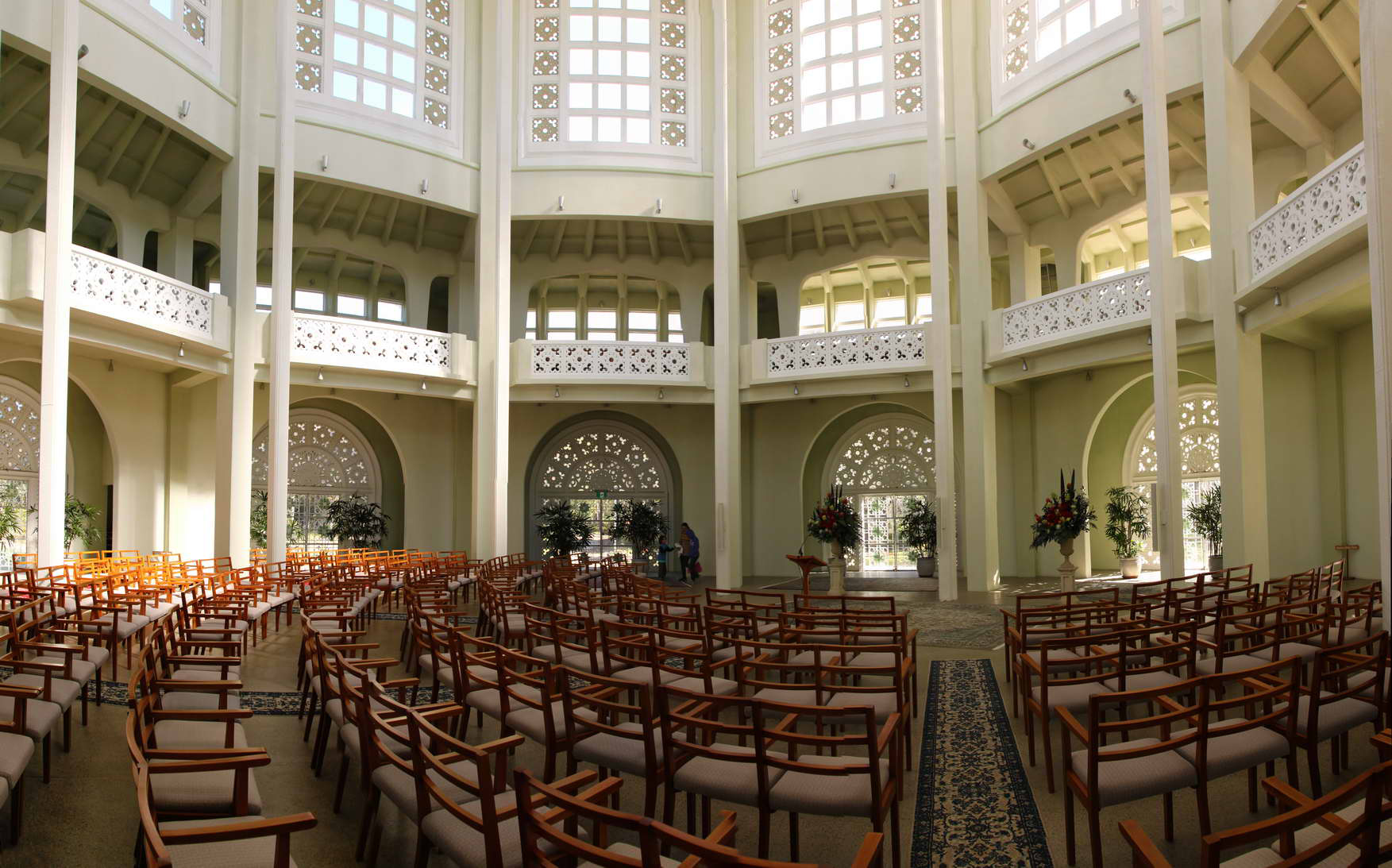
Interior of the Bahá'í House of Worship in Sydney

All Baháʼí Houses of Worship share certain architectural elements, some of which are specified in Baháʼí scripture. ‘Abdu'l-Baha's instructions to the architect of the first House of Worship, in Turkmenistan, were that the design should feature nine aspects of the building which each incorporate the number nine, with nine sides, nine columns, nine piers, nine doors, nine gardens, nine paths, nine pools, nine covered walkways and nine loggias. A circular shaped building with nine sides, nine gardens, and nine paths has been retained as a requirement for all subsequent Houses of Worship. The number nine is symbolically significant in Baháʼí belief, in which it represents completeness, perfection, and the Baháʼí teaching of the unity of religion. The number nine also holds significance in the Baháʼí Faith due its numerical value of Bahá according to the abjad numeral system. In a letter dated 20 April 1955 referencing the House of Worship to be built in Germany, Shoghi Effendi indicated via his secretary that nothing in the Baháʼí teachings required a dome for the building. Just a few months later, however, in a letter written on his behalf, he stated, "the Guardian feels that at this time all Baháí temples should have a dome." The Greatest Name, a Baháʼí symbol, appears in calligraphy in each temple, often at the top of the dome. All Baháʼí Houses of Worship have a central area for prayer with seats facing the direction of the Shrine of Baháʼu'lláh in present-day Acre, Israel, which is the Qiblih, which Baháʼís face when saying their obligatory prayers. Pulpits or altars are not permitted as architectural features, although readers can stand behind a simple, portable lectern.

Although sharing certain essential architectural elements, Baháʼí Houses of Worship nevertheless differ in other aspects of design, with proposals being accepted by Baháʼí and non-Baháʼí architects alike, and some completed Houses of Worship having been designed by non-Baháʼís. The Baháʼí Houses of Worship which were designed while Shoghi Effendi led the Baháʼí community include many classical architectural elements and generally avoid modern styles, which he described as "for the most part ugly, and altogether too utilitarian in aspect for a House of Worship". To varying degrees the design of Baháʼí Houses of Worship also reflect the indigenous cultural, social, and environmental elements of their locations. This element is generally more prominent in the more recent Houses of Worship.

== Purpose and activities ==
Baháʼí Houses of Worship are spaces in which both Baháʼís and non-Baháʼís can express devotion to God, are open to all people regardless of religion, race, gender, or any other distinction, and are often referred to by Baháʼís as 'silent teachers'. Baháʼí law states that a temple should be built with high aesthetic standards in each town and village. Furthermore, only scriptural texts from the Baháʼí Faith or other religions may be read or chanted inside, in any language, and that since there are no pulpits, readers are permitted to use a simple portable lectern. Baháʼí law also states that no pictures, statues, or images may be displayed within Houses of Worship, that no sermons may be delivered or ritualistic ceremonies practiced, and that although no musical instruments may be played inside, readings and prayers that have been set to music may be sung by choirs. Several Baháʼí Houses of Worship have established choirs that sing music based on the Baháʼí writings (scriptures). Memorial services are sometimes held in Bahá'í Houses of Worship, and whilst wedding ceremonies are not permitted inside, they are often held in the gardens of the temples. In mainly Christian countries, Baháʼí Houses of Worship offer weekly devotional services on Sundays, with the Baháʼí calendar not yet implemented for temple worship. The only requirements for entry to a Baháʼí House of Worship are modest attire and quiet behavior.

Shoghi Effendi stressed that the Baháʼí House of Worship is not solely a place of worship, but that it has to be linked with humanitarian, social, educational and scientific services which would benefit humanity. ‘Abdu'l-Bahá states that facilities including a hospital, medical center, dispensary, traveler's hostel, school for orphans and the poor, a home for the disabled and incapacitated, and a university, should be situated around the House of Worship. In this regard Shoghi Effendi stated that the future interaction between the House of Worship and its dependencies would provide "the essentials of Baháʼí worship and service, both so vital to the regeneration of the world". The Haziratu'l-Quds (commonly known as a Baháʼí centre) for Baháʼí administration and general Baháʼí purposes should also be in the vicinity of the House of Worship, Shoghi Effendi viewing their functions as being complimentary. At present, Baháʼí devotional meetings in most communities take place in homes or Baháʼí centres, but Elham Afnan notes that such activities "evoke the spirit" of a House of Worship with the goal that it can eventually be constructed.

== Funding and administration ==
In regard to funding for the building of Baháʼí Houses of Worship, both ʻAbdu'l-Bahá and Shoghi Effendi viewed these as international projects involving the global Baháʼí community, thereby bringing the Baháʼí world together and fostering bonds of unity. The cost of building Baháʼí Houses of Worship is covered by the voluntary contributions of Baháʼí communities throughout the world, which are expressly forbidden to accept monetary contributions for the promotion or advancement of the religion by non-Baháʼís. The maintenance and administration of Houses of Worship are overseen by the National Spiritual Assembly of the Baháʼís of the country in which they are situated. Worldwide, expenses associated with Houses of Worship (and with the buildings at the Baháʼí World Centre) constitute a significant part of Baháʼí administration spending

In general, a Baháʼí House of Worship and the grounds on which it stands are the property of the Baháʼí National Spiritual Assembly of the country in which they are situated, with the properties being held in a financial endowment. The House of Worship's activities and affairs are administered by a committee of the relevant country's National Spiritual Assembly, which spiritually serves as custodian of a temple which belongs to Baháʼís throughout the world.

== Continental Houses of Worship ==
Summary of Continental Baháʼí Houses of Worship
Location	Country	Dedicated	Architect	Capacity	Key Features
Wilmette	United States	1953	Louis Bourgeois	1,191	Oldest extant; listed on the National Register of Historic Places.
Kampala	Uganda	1961	Charles Mason Remey	800	Known as the "Mother Temple of Africa"; tallest building in East Africa at construction.
Sydney	Australia	1961	John Brogan	600	Features native Australian flora; "Mother Temple of the Antipodes".
Langenhain	Germany	1964	Teuto Rocholl	600	Modernist design with over 500 glass panels in the dome.
Panama City	Panama	1972	Peter Tillotson	550	Perched on Cerro Sonsonate; design evokes indigenous patterns.
Apia	Samoa	1984	Hossein Amanat	700	Dedicated by a Baháʼí head of state; open structure for island breezes.
Delhi	India	1986	Fariborz Sahba	2,500	Lotus-shaped; one of the most visited buildings in the world.
Santiago	Chile	2016	Siamak Hariri	600	Features translucent marble "sails" and won multiple architectural awards.

=== Wilmette, U.S. ===
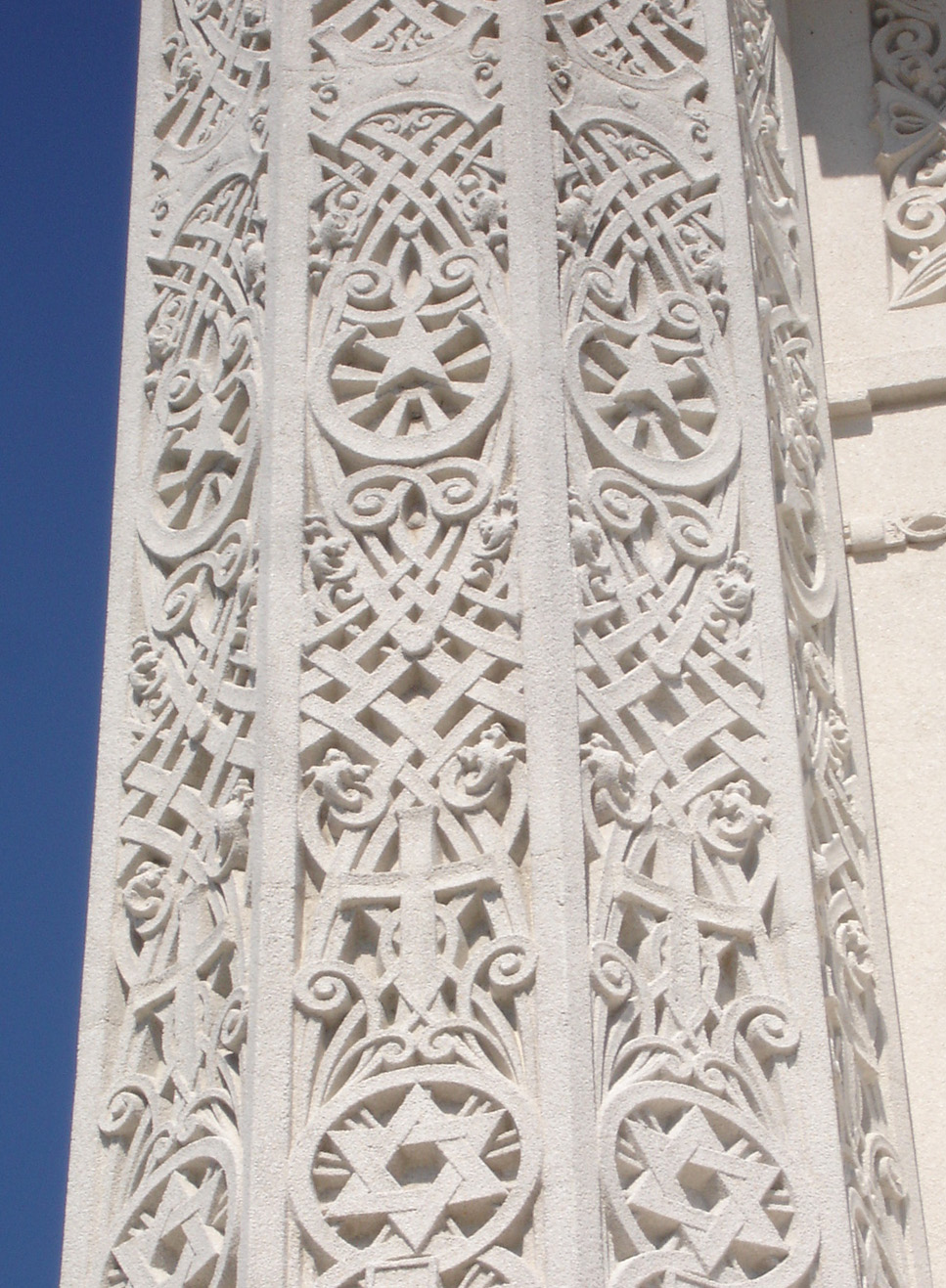
One of nine towers of the Wilmette temple

The oldest extant Baháʼí House of Worship is situated in Wilmette, on the shore of Lake Michigan near Chicago. It has received architectural awards, was added to the United States National Register of Historic Places in 1978, and was named one of the Seven Wonders of Illinois by the Illinois Bureau of Tourism in 2007. The temple is visited by about 250,000 people every year.

During his journeys to the West, ʻAbdu'l-Bahá visited Wilmette for the groundbreaking ceremony of the temple and laid the foundation stone on 1 May 1912. The principal architect was Louis Bourgeois, although due to impractical elements in his design amendments were required as the work progressed. Construction began in 1921 and was completed in 1951, and the temple was dedicated in 1953. The total cost of the construction was above $2.6 million. From 1958 to 2001, the Wilmette House of Worship was associated with a "home for the aged", operated by the U.S. Baháʼí community.

The cladding of the building is composed of a concrete mixture of Portland cement, quartz and sand, developed for the temple by John Joseph Earley. The building is 58.2 metres tall, the diameter of the dome is 27.4 metres, and the auditorium can accommodate 1,200 people. The exterior is adorned with symbols from various religions, including the Latin Cross, the Greek Cross, the star and crescent, the Star of David, the swastika (which is an ancient symbol used in Hinduism, Buddhism, and Jainism), and the five-pointed star. The grounds of the temple feature nine fountains, rows of Chinese junipers, and a wide range of flowers including thousands of tulips planted each fall.

=== Kampala, Uganda ===
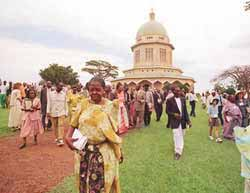
People outside the Kampala Baháʼí temple

Shoghi Effendi's intention had been that the third House of Worship would be built in Tehran, which he announced as being one of the goals of the Ten Year Global Plan (1953–63). However, because the persecution of Baháʼís in Iran in 1955 made this plan impossible, Shoghi Effendi announced that two Houses of Worship would be built, in Kampala, Uganda, and Sydney, Australia, with the announcement of the Kampala Temple being made on 23 August 1955. Apart from being situated at the heart of the African continent, the importance of Kampala for Shoghi Effendi was that not only was it one of the first places to which Baháʼís had moved during the Two Year African Campaign (1951–53), but that it was also the first place in Africa where large-scale enrollment of Baháʼís into the religion was occurring. The site chosen for the Kampala House of Worship was Kikaaya Hill. Following an initial design which had been rejected, a new design was prepared in Haifa by the American Baháʼí architect, Charles Mason Remey (1874–1974), under the direction of Shoghi Effendi, which was completed and approved in August 1956. The foundation stone was laid on 26 January 1957 by Rúhíyyih Khánum, representing Shoghi Effendi. Musa Banani, the first Hand of the Cause in Africa, was also present for the groundbreaking and placed a gift of soil from the Shrine of Baháʼu'lláh, sent by Shoghi Effendi, in the foundation. The dedication ceremony was held in January 1961 and was also attended by Rúhíyyih Khánum.

The building is more than 39 metres high, and over 100 metres in diameter at the base. The dome is over 37 metres high and 13 metres in diameter. As a protection against earthquakes that can occur in the region, the temple has a foundation that goes 3 metres beneath the ground. The temple has seating for 800 people. At the time it was built, the Kampala Baháʼí temple was the tallest building in East Africa.

The temple's dome is built out of fixed mosaic tiles from Italy, whereas the tiles of the lower roof are from Belgium. The wall panels contain windows of green, pale blue, and amber colored glass of German origin. Both the timber used for making the doors and benches and the stone used for the walls of the temple are from within Uganda itself. The property includes the House of Worship, extensive gardens, a guest house, and an administrative centre.

=== Sydney, Australia ===
The fourth Baháʼí temple to be completed (and third still standing) is in Ingleside in the northern suburbs of Sydney, Australia. This temple serves as the "Mother Temple of the Antipodes". According to Jennifer Taylor, a historian at Sydney University, it is among Sydney's four most significant religious buildings constructed in the twentieth century. The initial design by Charles Mason Remey was given to Sydney architect John Brogan to develop and complete. It was dedicated in September 1961 and opened to the public after four years of construction.

Construction materials include crushed quartz concrete, local hardwoods in the interior, and concrete and marble in the dome. There is seating for 600 people. The building stands 38 metres in height, has a diameter at its widest point of 20 metres, and is a highly visible landmark from Sydney's northern beaches. The property is set high in a natural bushland setting overlooking the Pacific Ocean. The surrounding gardens contain a variety of native Australian flora including waratahs, three species of eucalypts, caleyi and other grevillea, acacia, and woody pear.

=== Langenhain, Germany ===
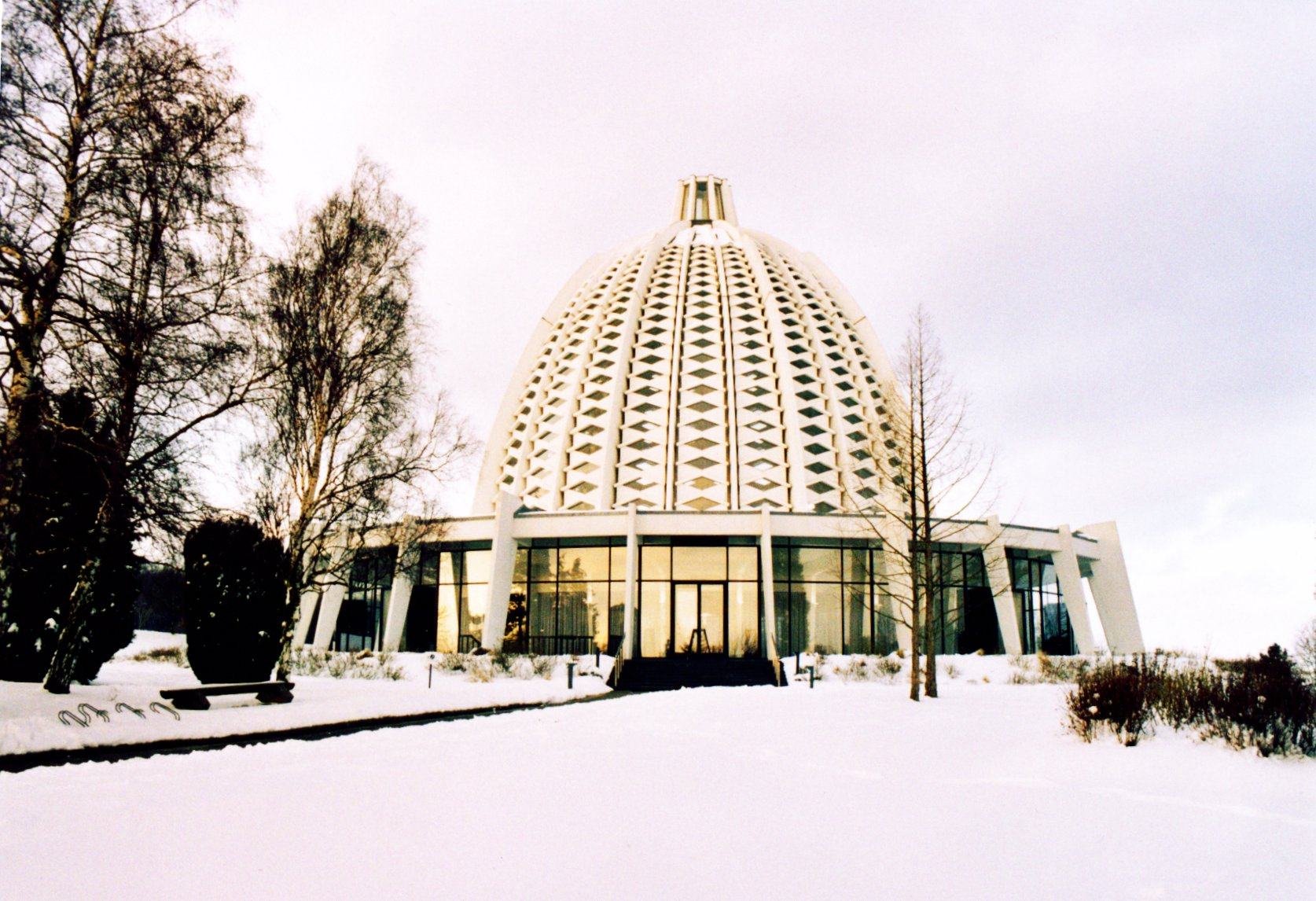
The Baháʼí House of Worship in Germany during winter

The Baháʼí House of Worship in Germany, designed by the German architect Teuto Rocholl, is situated at the foot of the Taunus Mountains, in the village of Langenhain near Frankfurt. The foundation stone for the temple was laid on 20 November 1960 by Amelia Collins and the temple was dedicated on 4 July 1964. Its construction was opposed by a number of Catholic and Protestant churches in Germany at the time. The temple's superstructure was prefabricated in the Netherlands from steel and concrete. The center of the interior of the temple is illuminated by light shining through over 500 glass panels above. At its base the interior is 48 metres in diameter, the height from ground level is 28.3 metres, and the temple can seat up to 600 people. Seena Fazel describes the House of Worship as having a "distinctive concrete and glass modernist design".

=== Panama City, Panama ===
The Baháʼí House of Worship in Panama is situated in Panama City, and was designed by the English architect Peter Tillotson. Rúhíyyih Khánum laid the foundation stone on 8 October 1967 and the temple was dedicated on 29 April 1972. Situated on the summit of mount Cerro Sonsonate,10 km northeast of Panama City, it is visible from many parts of the city.^{[4]} The temple is built from local stone laid out in patterns evoking Native American fabric designs and temples of the ancient Americas. The dome is covered with thousands of small oval tilesand the building rises to a height of 28 metres.The temple floor is made from terrazzo, and the seats, which are constructed from mahogany, accommodate up to 550 people.

=== Tiapapata, Samoa ===
The Baháʼí House of Worship in Samoa, designed by Hossein Amanat, is situated in Tiapapata, in the hills behind Apia. On 27 January 1979 the world's first Baháʼí head of state, Malietoa Tanumafili II of Samoa, laid the first foundation stone in the presence of Rúhíyyih Khánum, both of them attending the dedication on 1 September 1984. The total cost of building the temple was $6.5 million. It occupies 6.88 hectares of land, its height is 30 meters, and it seats up to 500 people in the main hall plus 200 on the mezzanine level. The structure is open to the island breezes, Graham Hassall noting that this fosters a suitable environment for meditation and prayer.

=== Delhi, India ===
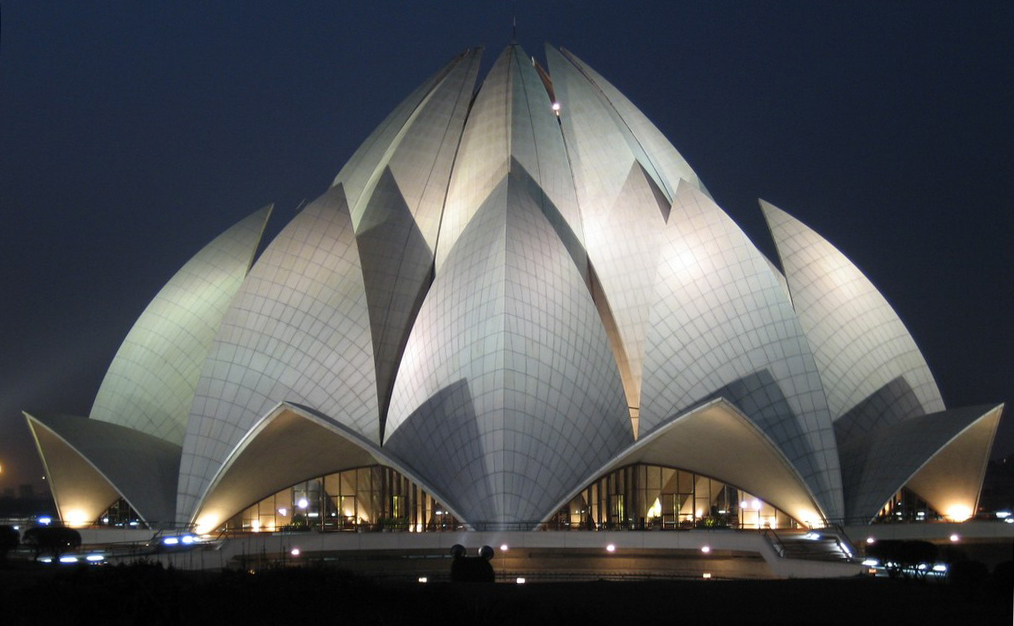
The Lotus Temple at night

The Baháʼí House of Worship in Bahapur, Delhi, India, widely known as the Lotus Temple, was designed by Iranian-American architect Fariborz Sahba. Rúhíyyih Khánum laid the foundation stone on 17 October 1977 and dedicated the temple on 24 December 1986. The total cost was $10 million. The temple has won numerous architectural awards, including from the Institution of Structural Engineers, the Illuminating Engineering Society of North America, and the Architectural Society of China. It has also become a major attraction for people of various religions, with up to 100,000 visitors on some Hindu holy days; estimates for the number of visitors per year range from 2.5 million to 5 million. The temple is often listed as one of Delhi's main tourist attractions, and is considered as being one of the most visited buildings in the world.

Inspired by the sacred lotus flower, the temple's design is composed of 27 free-standing, marble-clad "petals" grouped into clusters of three and thus forming nine entryways. The temple's shape has symbolic and inter-religious significance because the lotus is often associated with the Hindu goddess Lakshmi. Nine doors open onto a central hall with permanent seating for 1,200 people, which can be expanded for a total seating capacity of 2,500. The temple rises to a height of 40.8 metres and is situated on a property that covers 105,000 square metres and features nine surrounding ponds. An educational centre beside the temple was established in 2017. The temple uses solar panels to produce 120 kW of the 500 kW of electricity it requires in total.

=== Santiago, Chile ===
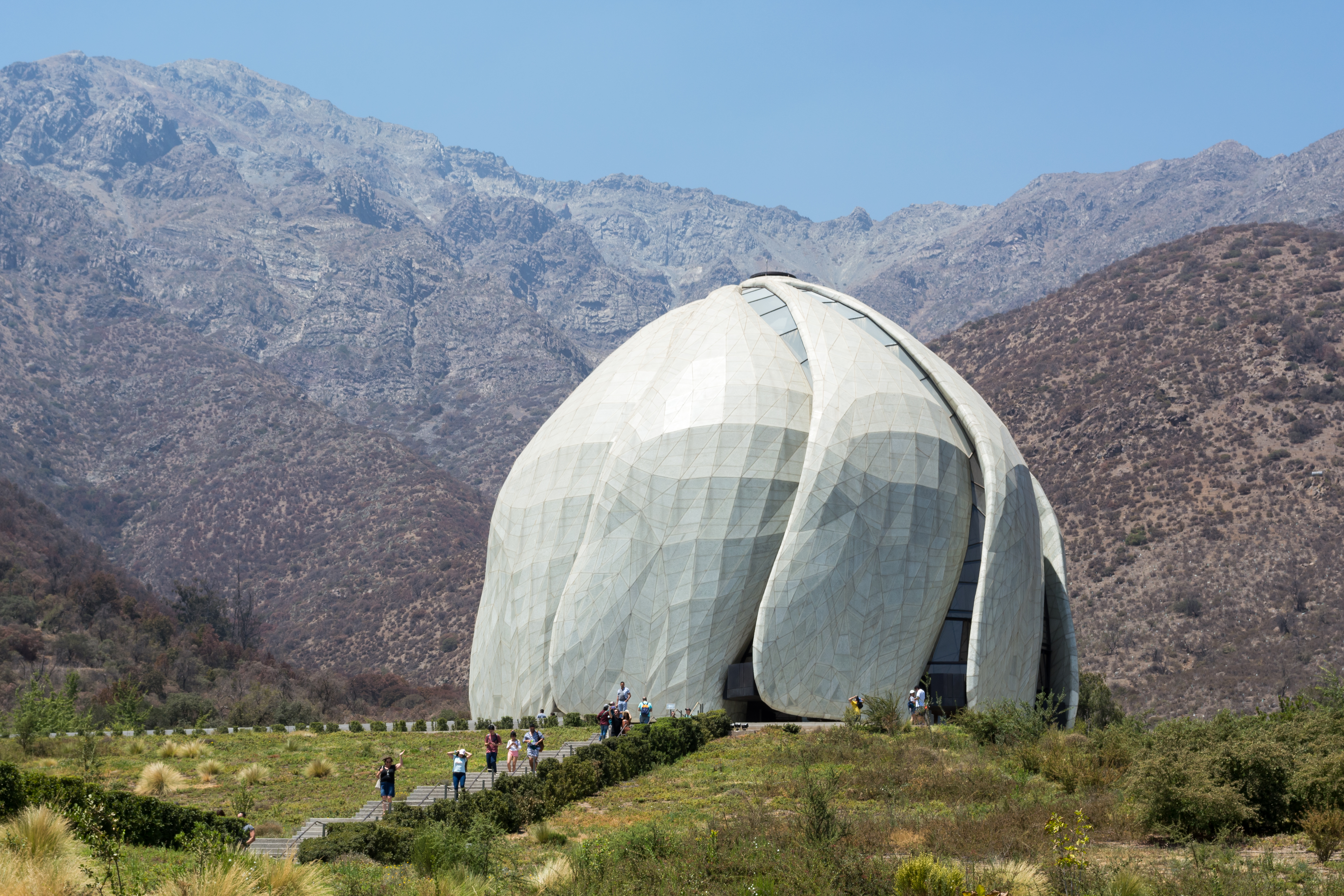
The Santiago Bahá'í House of Worship

The continental Baháʼí House of Worship for South America (or "Mother Temple for South America") is located in Santiago, Chile. Shoghi Effendi announced Chile as the site for the continental temple of South America in 1953, and in 2001 the process of building the temple was launched. The chosen design was by Siamak Hariri of Hariri Pontarini Architects in Toronto, Ontario, Canada. Excavation was initiated at the site in 2010, construction began in 2012, and the doors opened on 19 October 2016. The Santiago temple cost a total of $30 million to build and has won a range of Canadian and international architectural awards.

The Santiago Baháʼí House of Worship is ringed by nine entrances, nine pathways, and nine fountains, and the structure is composed of nine arching translucent "sails". These have also been described as nine "petals" and the temple's shape as "floral"; the "petals" are separated by glass which allows light to illuminate the temple's interior. The exterior of the "petals" is made from cast glass while the interior is made from translucent Portuguese marble. The sides of the temple are held up on the inside by a steel and aluminum superstructure. The temple can seat 600 people and it is 30 metres high and 30 metres in diameter.

== Other Houses of Worship ==
=== Completed but destroyed ===
The first Baháʼí House of Worship was built in the city of Ashgabat, which was then a part of Russia's Transcaspian Oblast and is now the capital of Turkmenistan. It was started in 1902 and mostly completed by 1907, but was not fully finished until 1919. Plans for this House of Worship were first made during the lifetime of Baháʼu'lláh. The design was prepared by Ustad Ali-Akbar Banna, and after his death the construction was supervised by Vakílu'd-Dawlih. In 1928, the House of Worship was expropriated by the Soviet authorities and thereafter it was leased back to the Baháʼís. This arrangement lasted until 1938, when it was fully secularized and turned into an art gallery. The 1948 Ashgabat earthquake seriously damaged the building, rendering it unsafe; the heavy rains of the following years weakened the structure, until in 1963 the building was demolished and the site was converted into a public park.

The Ashgabat House of Worship was surrounded by gardens with nine ponds. At the four corners of the plot of land surrounding the House of Worship were various buildings: a boys' school; a girls' school; a large meeting hall; and a group of buildings including the offices of the Local Spiritual Assembly, a reading room, and a room for meeting with enquirers.

=== Completed and standing ===
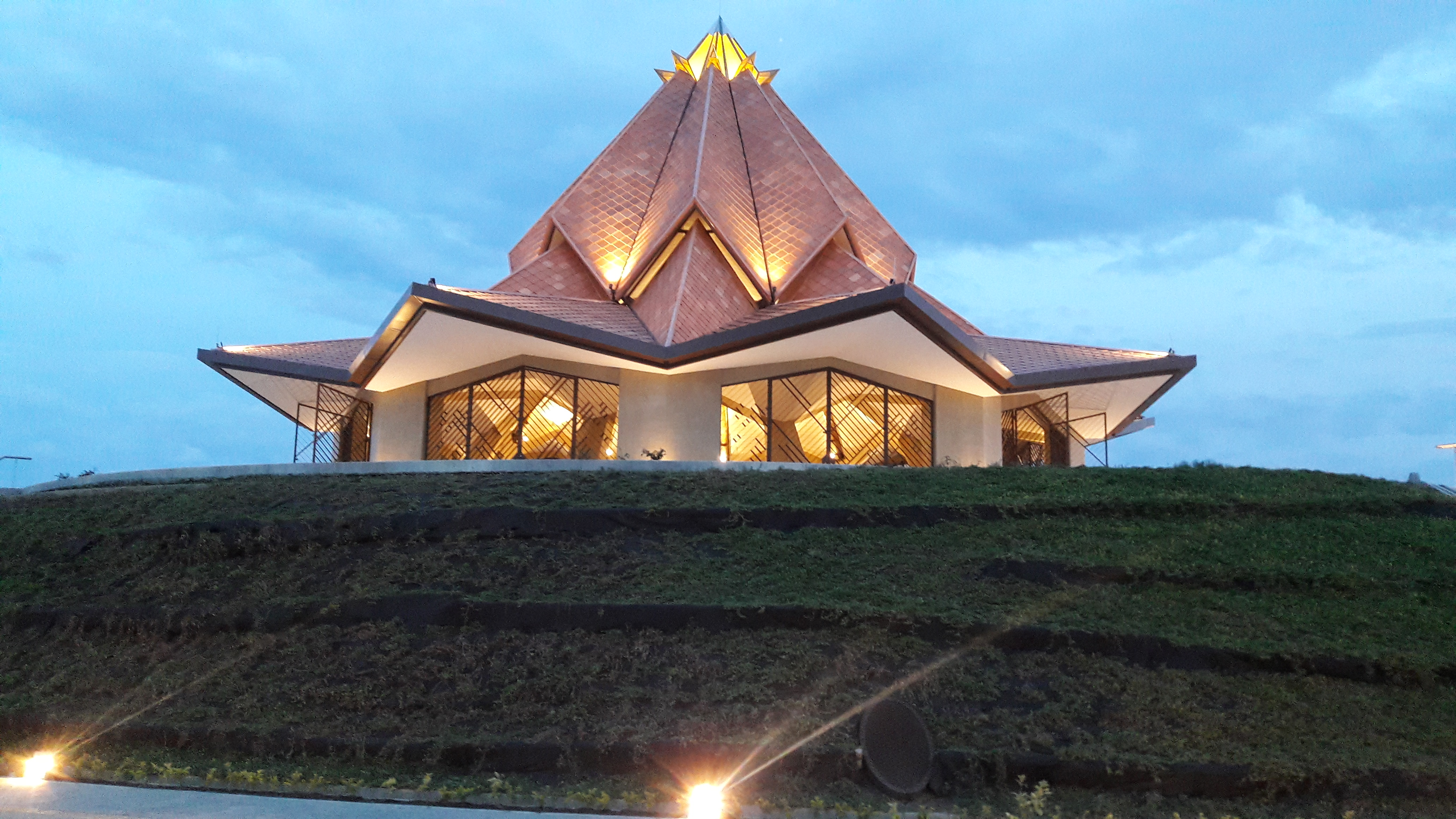
Local Baháʼí House of Worship in Agua Azul, Colombia

The Battambang, Cambodia temple was the world's first local Baháʼí House of Worship to be completed. The temple was designed by Cambodian architect Sochet Vitou Tang, who is a practicing Buddhist, and integrates distinctive Cambodian architectural principles. A dedication ceremony and official opening conference took place on 1–2 September 2017, attended by Cambodian dignitaries, locals, and representatives of Baháʼí communities throughout southeast Asia.

The temple in Agua Azul in the municipality of Villa Rica, Cauca Department, Colombia was the second local Baháʼí House of Worship to be completed in the world. The temple design, by architect Julian Gutierrez Chacón, was inspired by the shape of the cocoa seed, which was integral to the local culture before the arrival of the sugar cane industry. An opening dedication ceremony took place on 22 July 2018, followed by devotional services in the House of Worship.

A local Baháʼí House of Worship was opened on 23 May 2021 in Matunda Soy, Kenya.

On 13 November 2021, a local Baháʼí House of Worship opened near the town of Lenakel on the island of Tanna, Vanuatu.

The world's first national Baháʼí House of Worship, located in Kinshasa, Democratic Republic of the Congo, was dedicated and opened its doors on 25 March 2023.

A national Baháʼí House of Worship in Port Moresby, Papua New Guinea was dedicated on 25 May 2024.

=== Planned ===
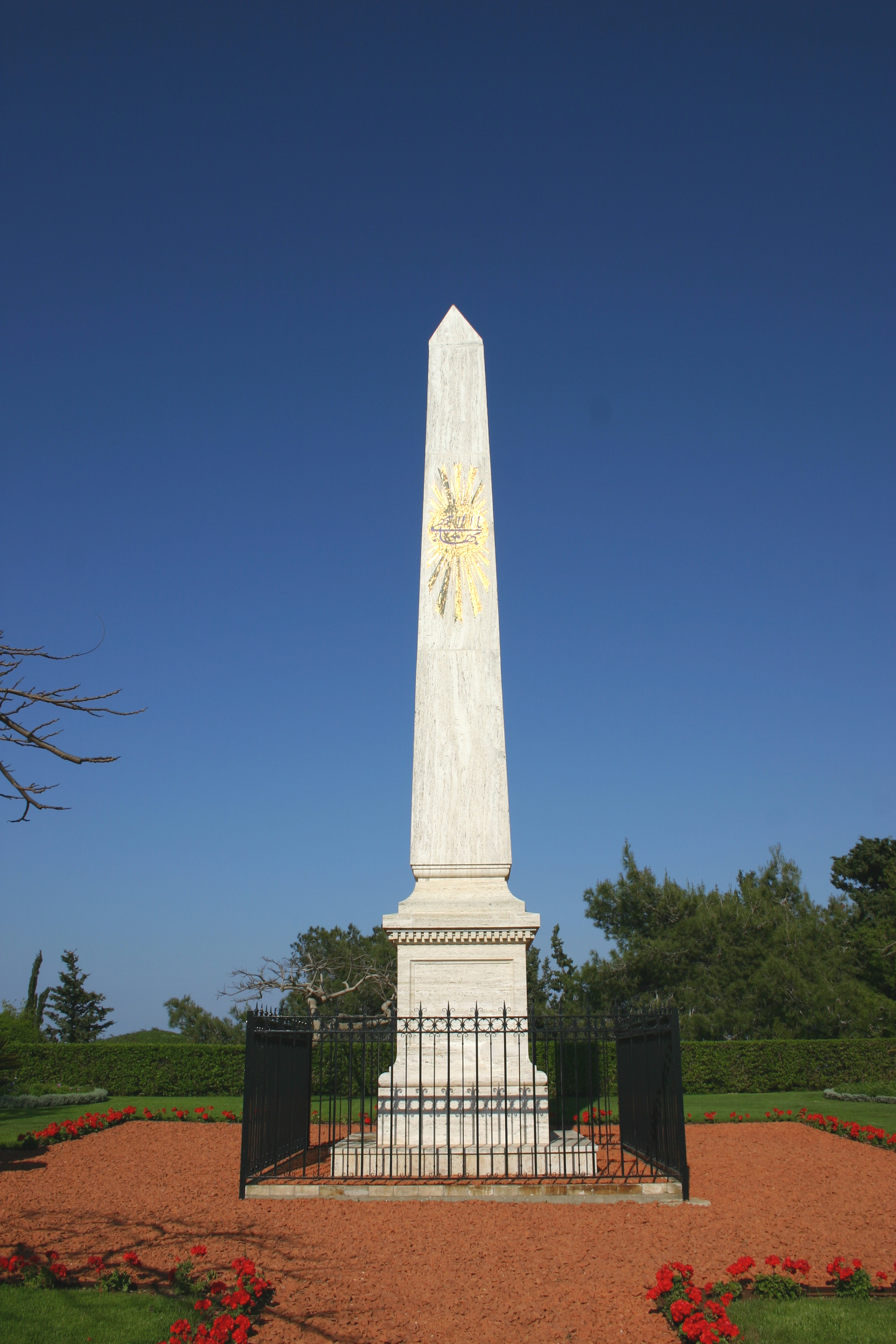
Obelisk marking the position of the future Bahá'í House of Worship, Mount Carmel, Haifa, Israel

In 2021, groundbreaking ceremony took place for a local Baháʼí House of Worship in Hargawan near Bihar Sharif, India. The design for the temple near Bihar Sharif, created by architect Amritha Ballal, was shortlisted for the 2022 World Architecture Festival.

In April 2023, the Universal House of Justice announced plans for three further Houses of Worship: local Houses of Worship in Nepal and Zambia and a national House of Worship in Canada. In May 2026, the architectural design for the House of Worship in Nepal was unveiled, and in October 2026 the design for the House of Worship in Canada was unveiled.

In October 2024, the Universal House of Justice announced plans for another three Houses of Worship: a local House of Worship in Batouri, Cameroon and national Houses of Worship in Brasília, Brazil and Lilongwe, Malawi. The design for the House of Worship to be built in Cameroon was unveiled in 2026.

In April 2025, the Universal House of Justice announced plans for a national House of Worship to be built in Manila, Philippines.

A site was selected and purchased in 1932 for a Baháʼí House of Worship in Hadiqa, northeast of Tehran, Iran. Charles Mason Remey provided a design for this temple which Shoghi Effendi then approved. A drawing of the design was published in an issue of The Baháʼí World. To date, however, the construction of this temple has not been possible.

Similarly, a design was created for a Baháʼí House of Worship near Mount Carmel in Haifa, Israel. It was created by Charles Mason Remey and approved by Shoghi Effendi in 1952. A photo of the model of the Haifa House of Worship can be found in an issue of The Baháʼí World. An obelisk marks the site where the House of Worship is to be built, but as of 2010, plans for constructing this House of Worship have not been made.

== Analysis ==
Margit Warburg describes the architecture of the Baháʼí Houses of Worship as "remarkable". Denis MacEoin writes that several of the Baháʼí Houses of Worship are "fine examples of modern religious architecture", but argues that no distinct Baháʼí architectural style has emerged given that the best-designed Baháʼí Houses of Worship each have a unique character. Anne Gordon Perry argues, by contrast, that Baháʼí Houses of Worship may provide "the clearest indication of a distinctive Bahá’í aesthetic thus far ... with their characteristic nine sides, circular domes, serene and welcoming gardens and walkways, fountains, and other aesthetic elements".

Warburg writes that the presence of Baháʼí Houses of Worship on all continents except Antarctica shows the worldwide presence of the Baháʼí Faith. She also argues that there are a number of parallels between Baháʼí Houses of Worship and mosques: decoration with geometric patterns rather than images or statues, the absence of offering or communion rituals, and the adaptation of architectural designs to local cultural styles.

Warburg found in her fieldwork at several Baháʼí temples that almost all attendees of weekly services were Baháʼís but that many non-Baháʼís visited at other times during the week. She has questioned whether having the temples open for visitors but without activities at most times during the week is "the optimal mission strategy" for Baháʼís, noting an account of a visitor confused by one temple's apparent lack of purpose. However, Graham Hassall has disputed Warburg's analysis, pointing to the large number of tourists visiting many Baháʼí Houses of Worship and positive coverage in online media such as travel guides and blogs.

== Gallery ==
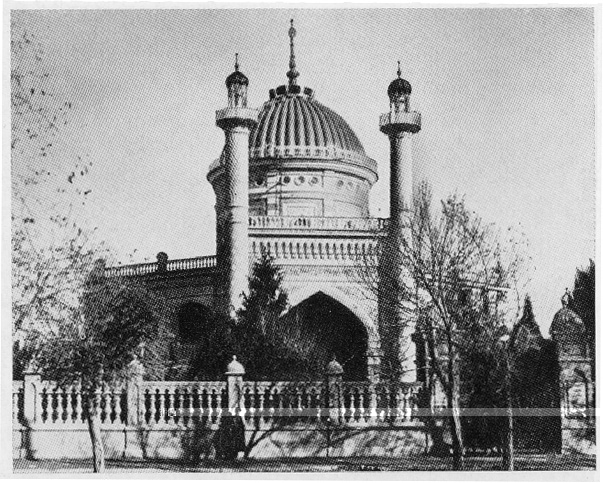
Ashgabat, Turkmenistan (since destroyed)

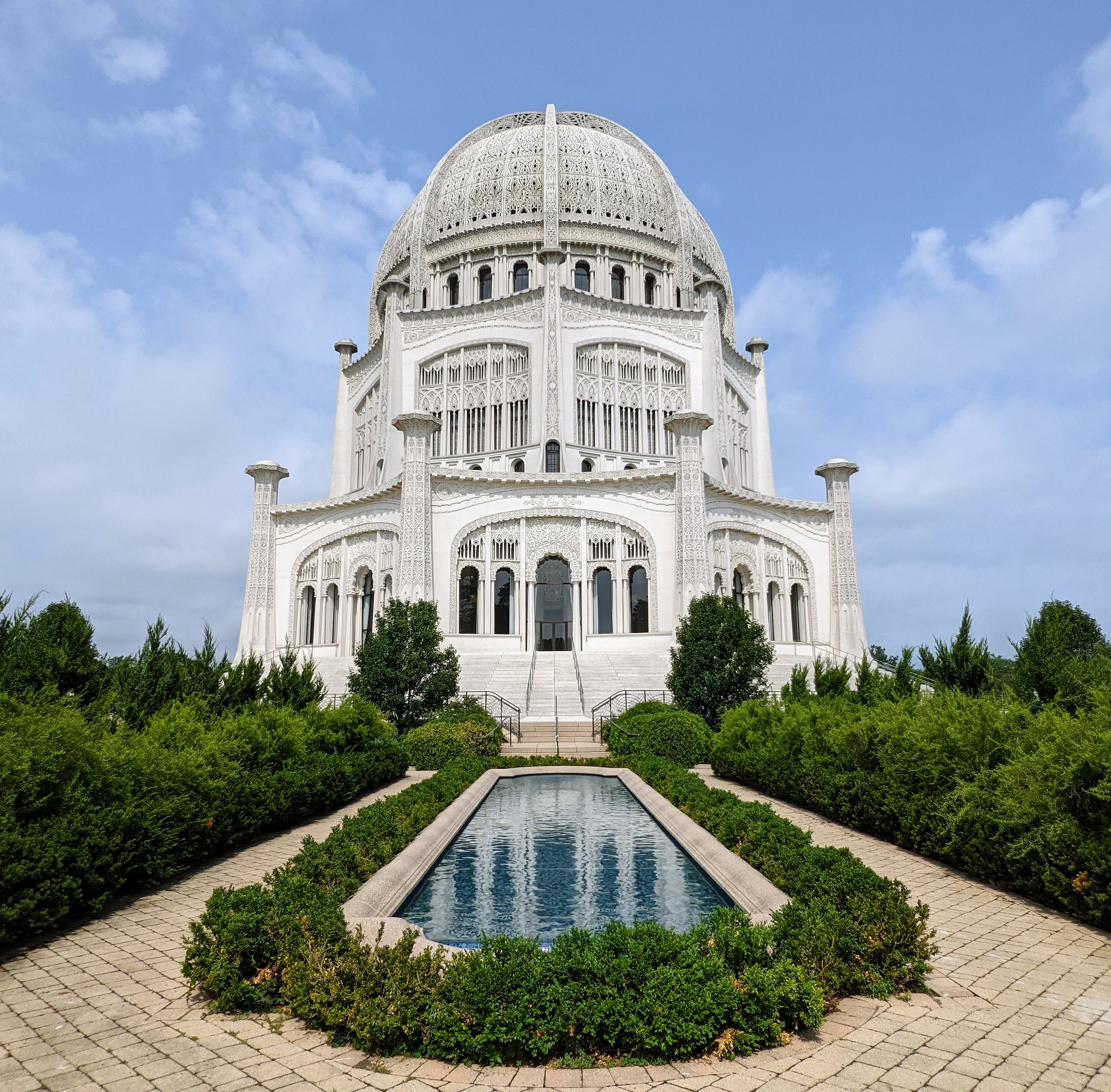
Wilmette, United States

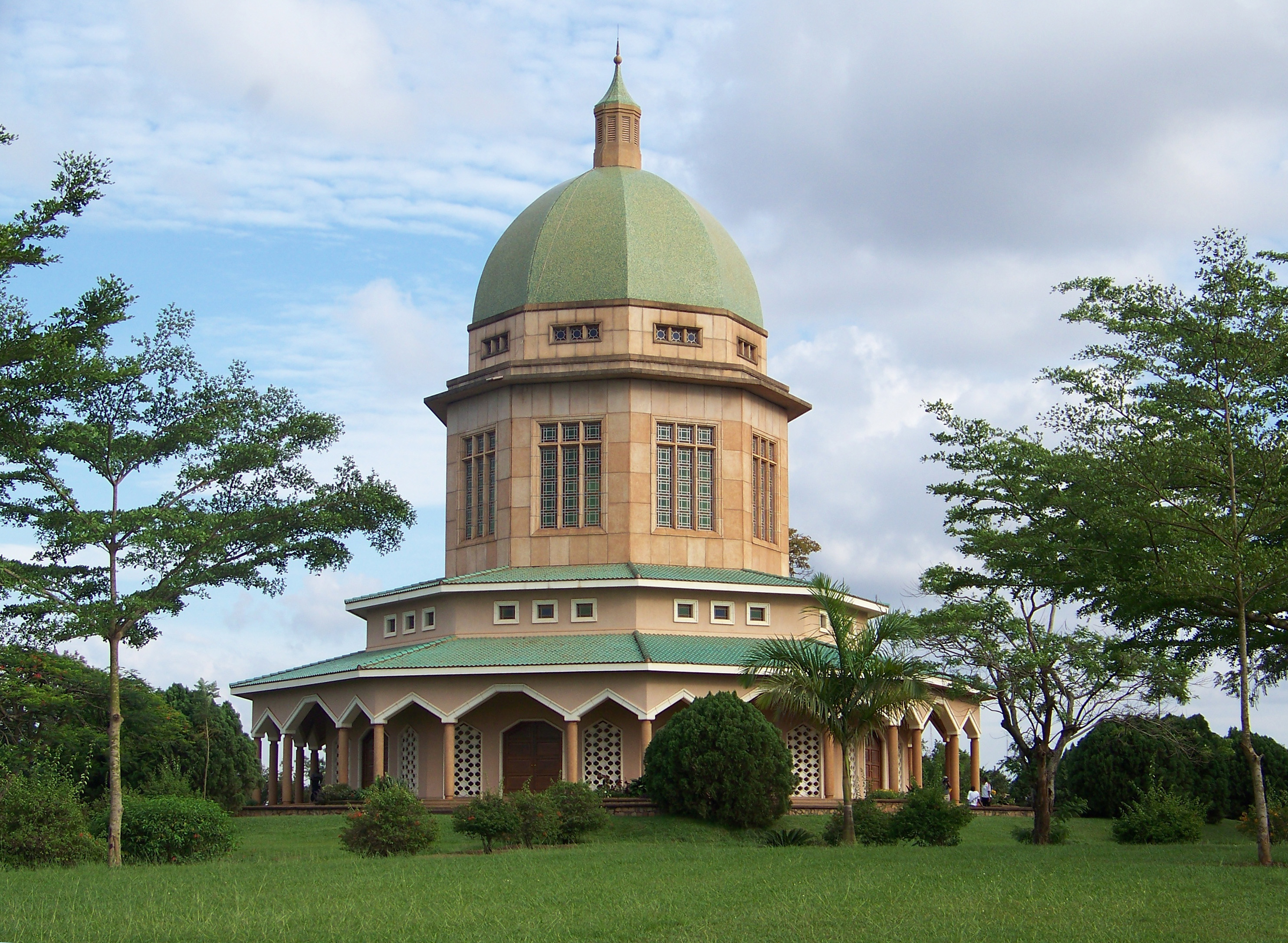
Kampala, Uganda

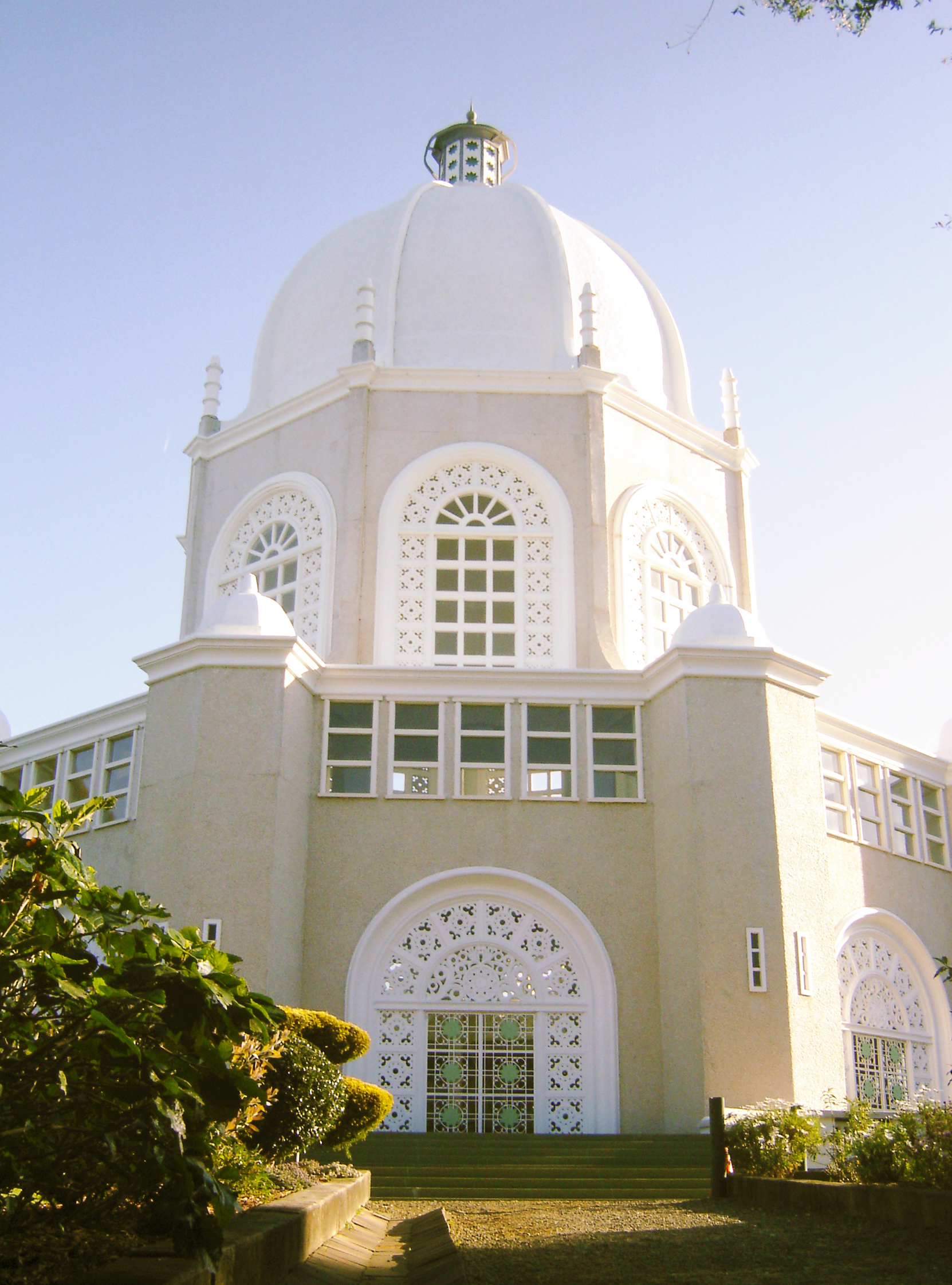
Sydney, Australia

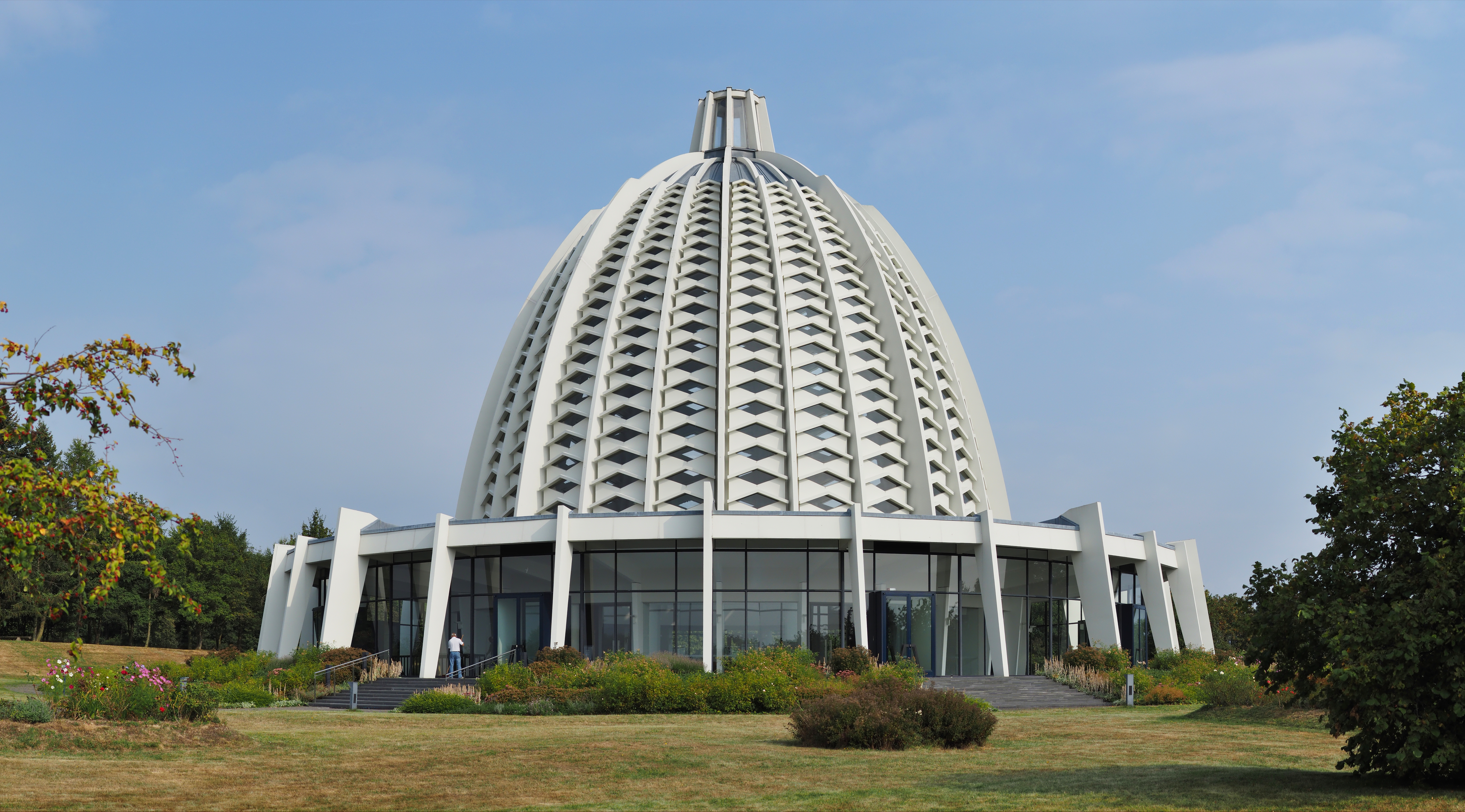
Langenhain, Germany

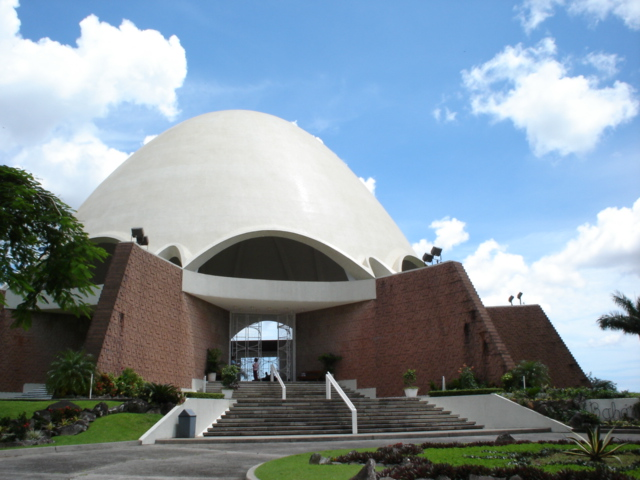
Panama City, Panama

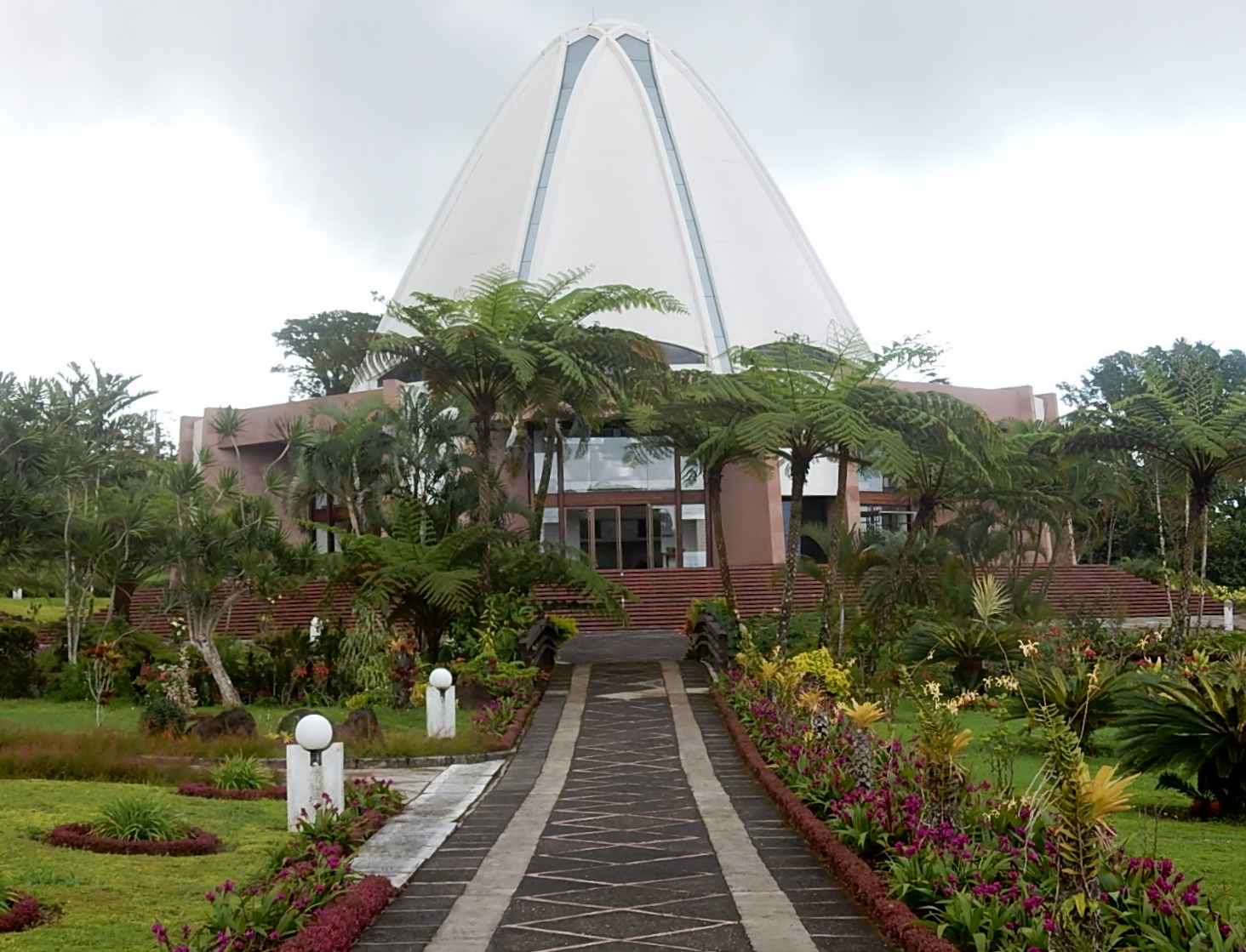
Tiapapata, Samoa

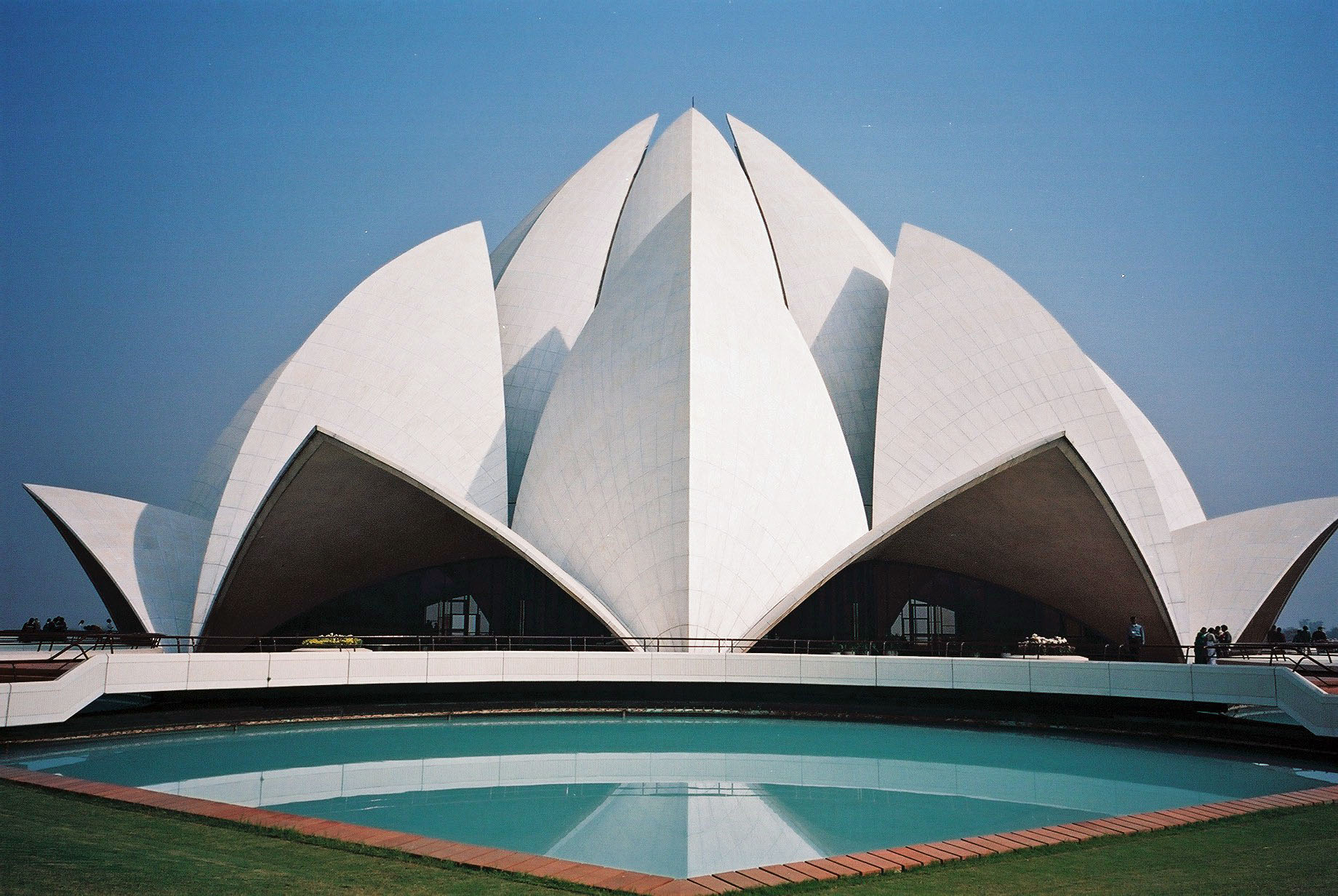
Delhi, India – known as the Lotus Temple

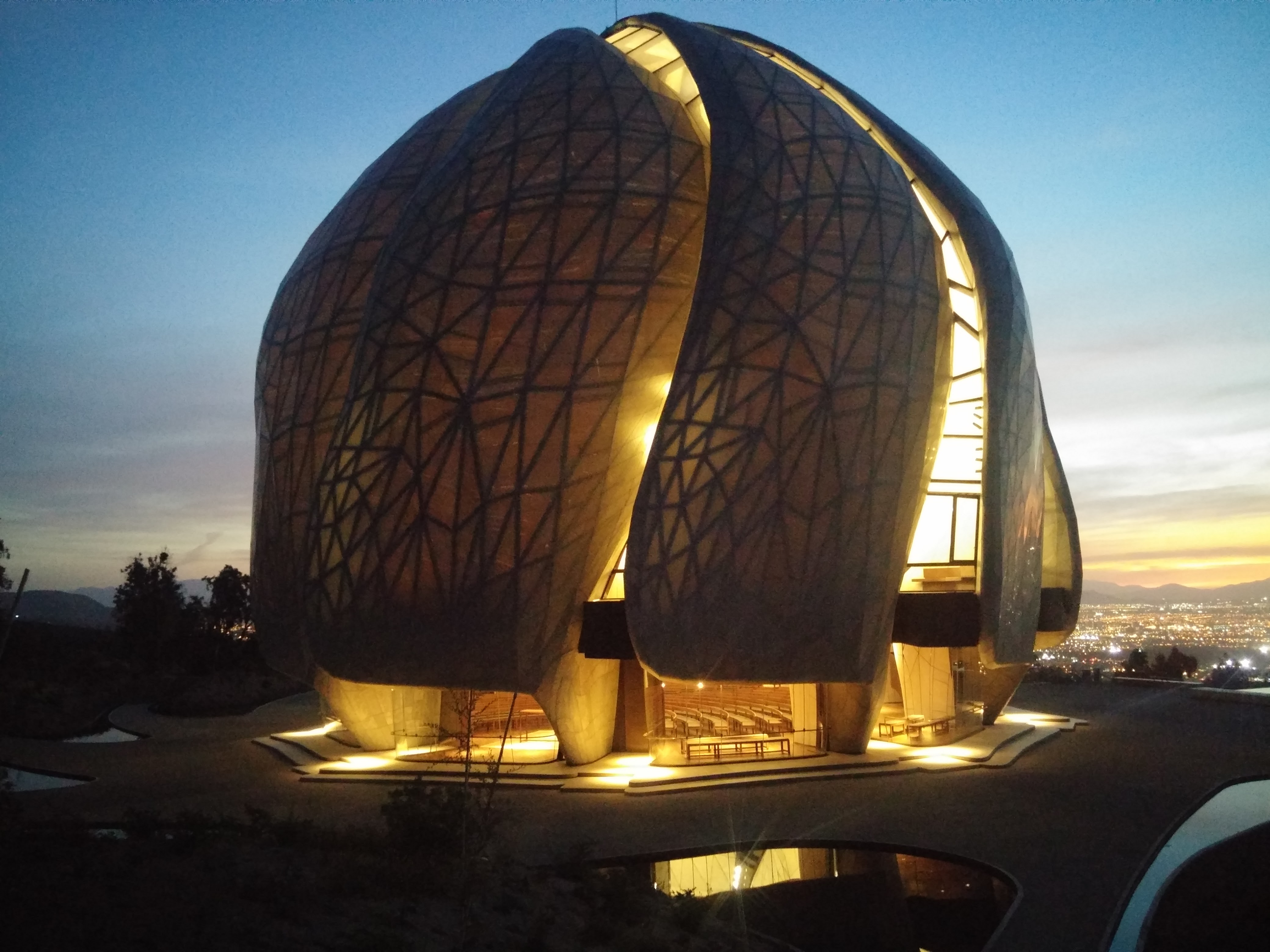
Santiago, Chile

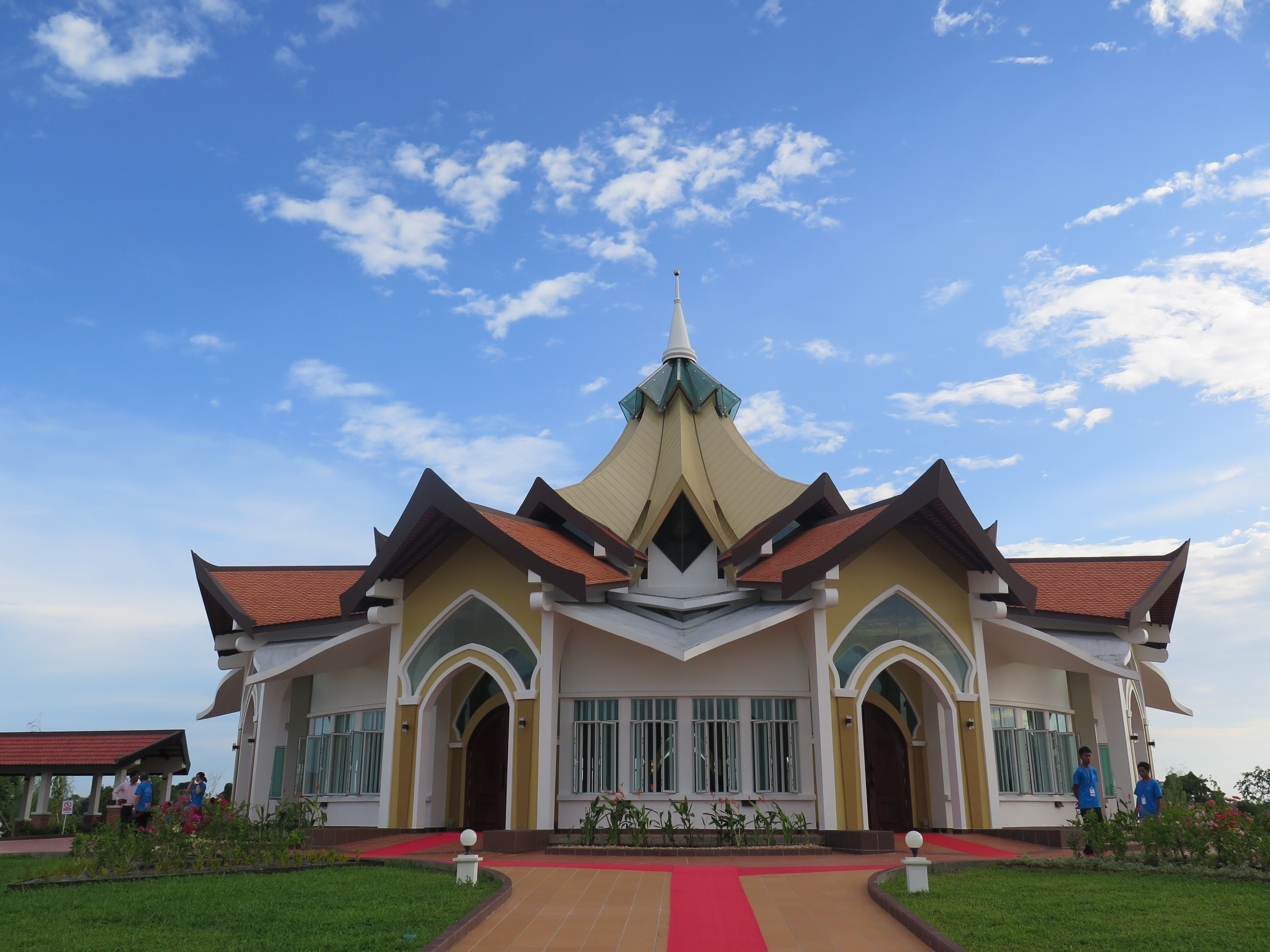
Battambang, Cambodia

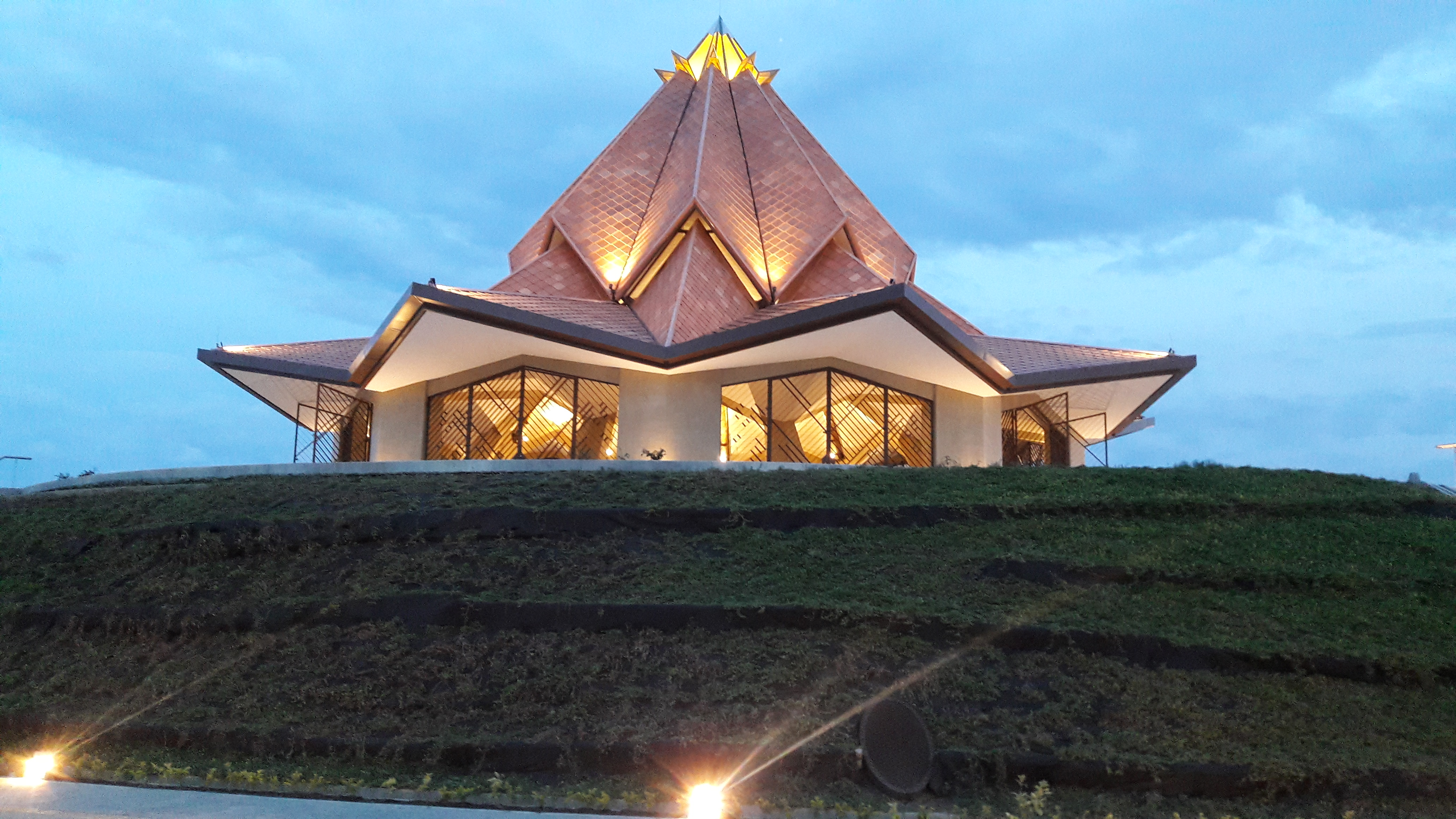
Agua Azul, Colombia

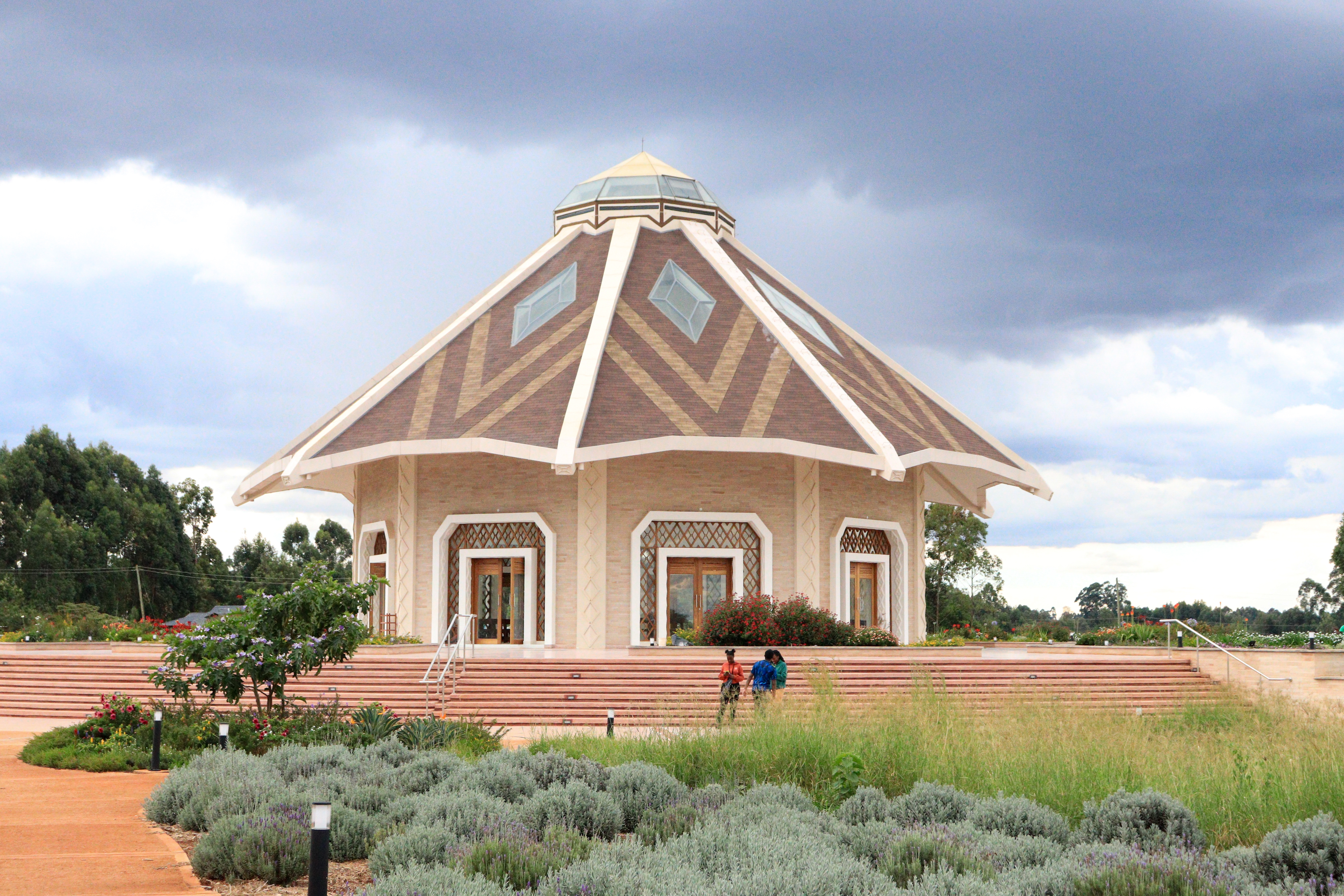
Matunda Soy, Kenya

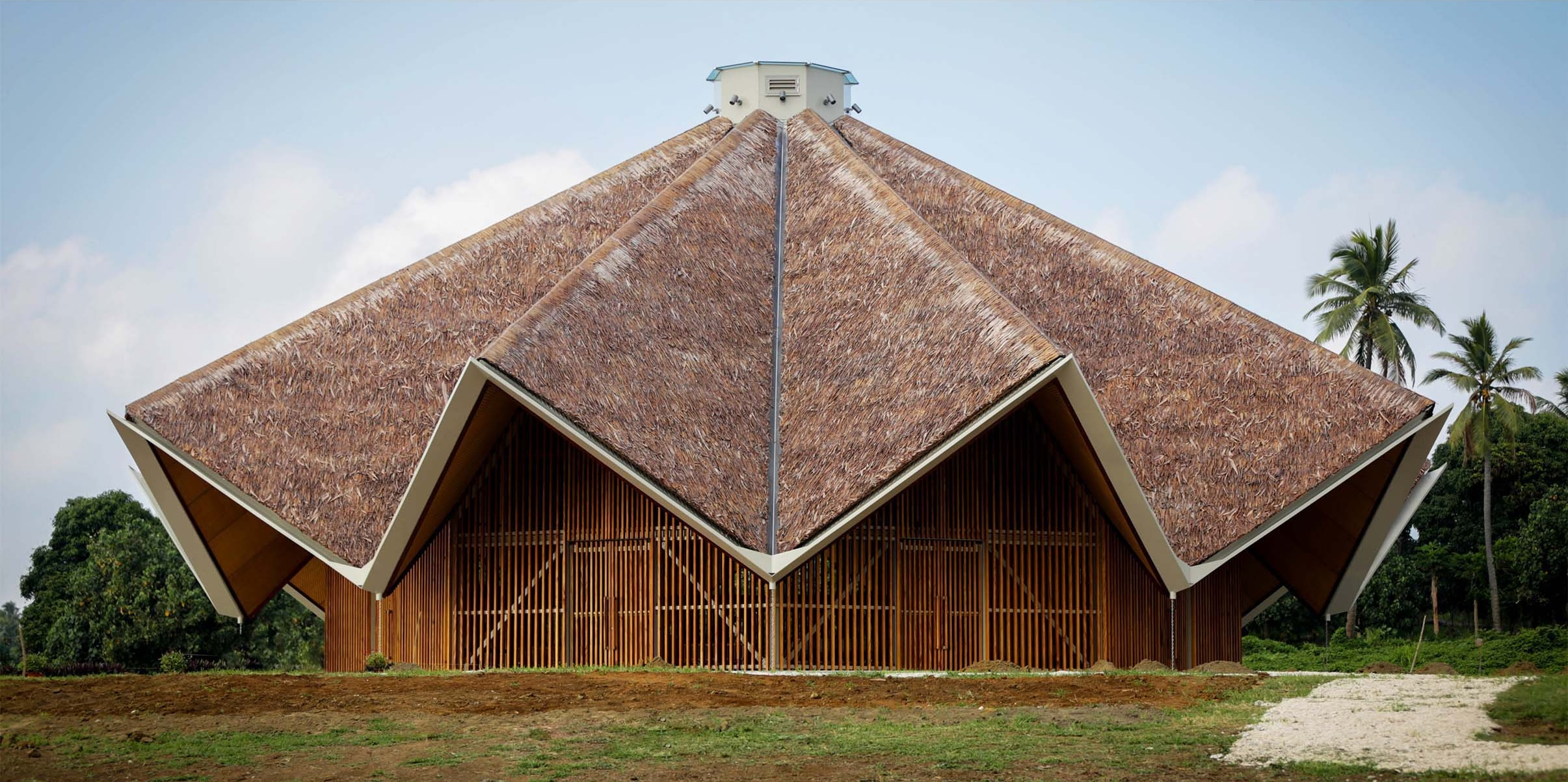
Tanna, Vanuatu

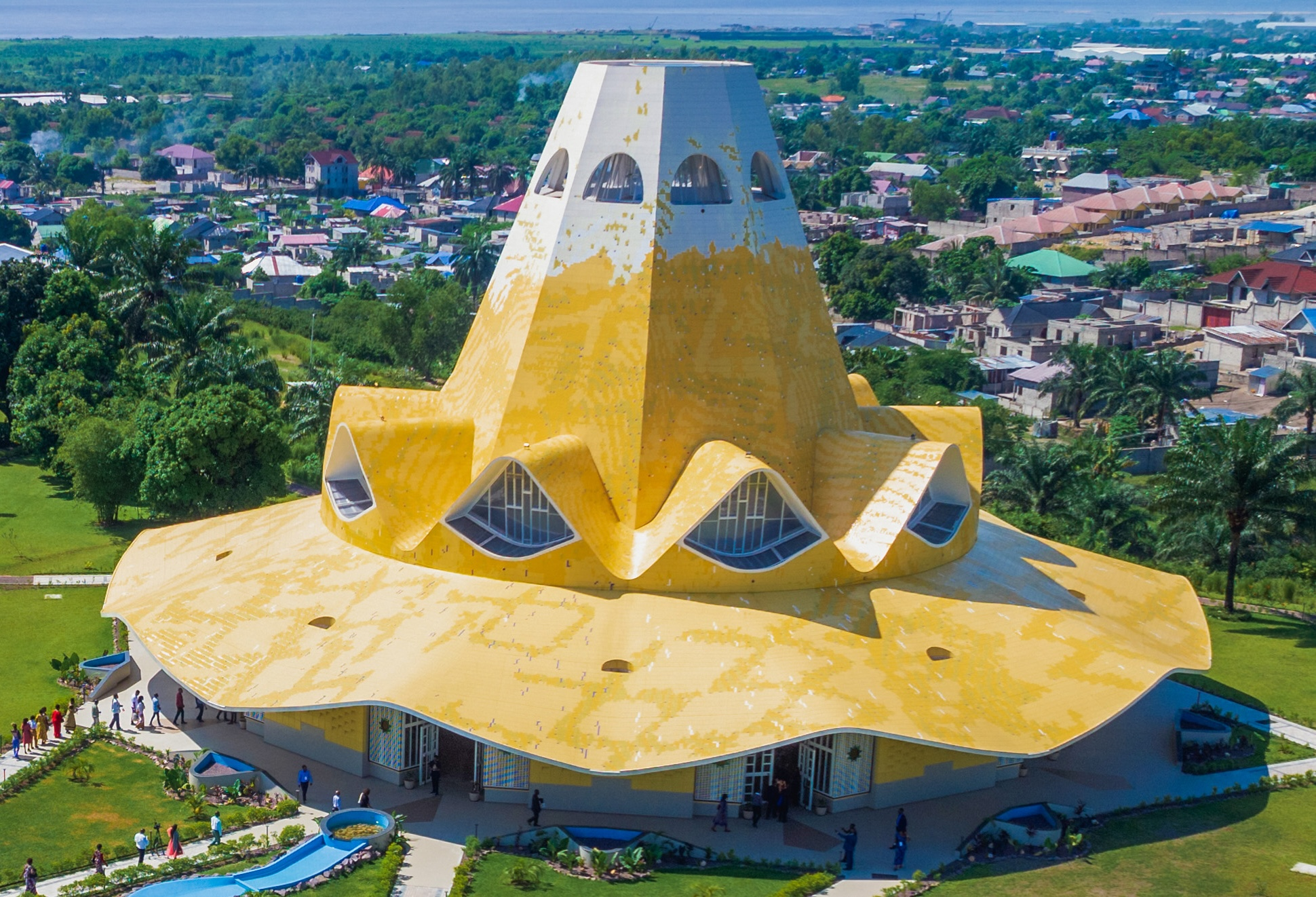
Kinshasa, Democratic Republic of the Congo

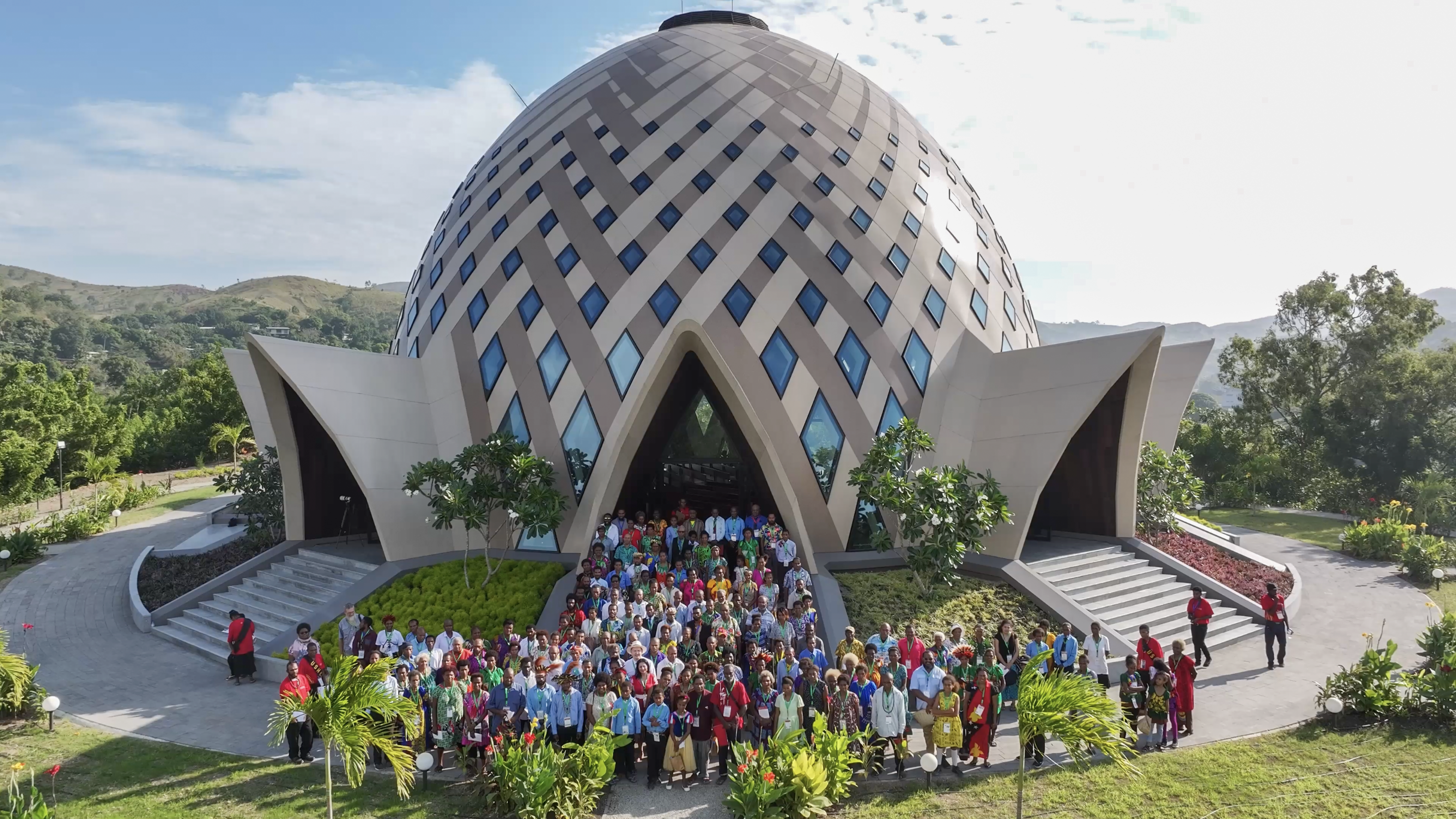
Port Moresby, Papua New Guinea

Design for a Baháʼí House of Worship to be built in Tehran, Iran

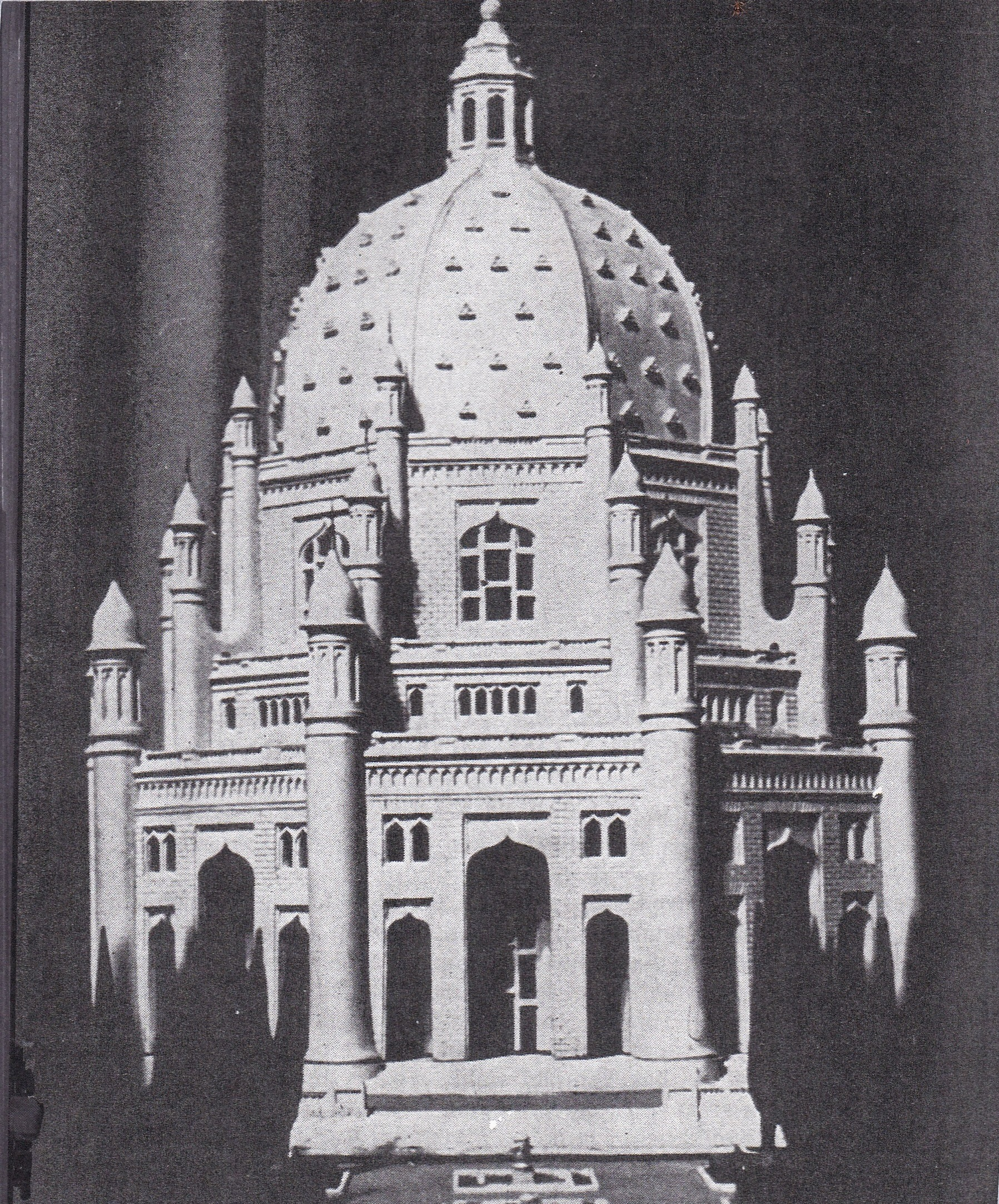
Design for a Baháʼí House of Worship to be built in Haifa, Israel

== See also ==
- List of Baháʼí Houses of Worship
- Terraces (Baháʼí)
- Prayer in the Baháʼí Faith
- Sacral architecture
