= Haziratu'l-Quds =

National, regional and local administrative centres in the Baháʼí Faith

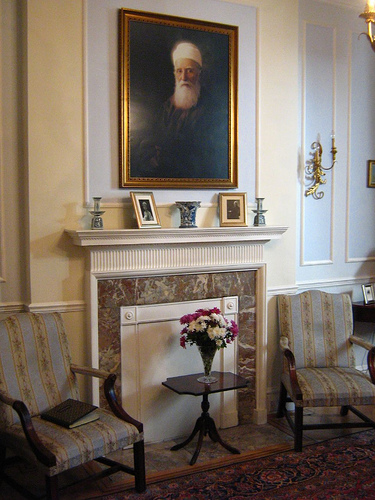
Waiting room inside the National Bahá'í Centre of the United Kingdom. A portrait of 'Abdu'l-Bahá hangs above the mantel.

A Haziratu'l-Quds (Arabic, sacred fold), or Baháʼí centre, is one of the national, regional or local Baháʼí administrative centres.

Shoghi Effendi, the head of the Baháʼí Faith in the first half of the 20th century, wrote that the Haziratu'l-Quds should include the secretariat, treasury, archives, library, publishing office, assembly hall, council chamber and the pilgrims' hostel. He also stated that its functions would be complementary to those of the Baháʼí House of Worship, and that it would be desirable if both these buildings would be on the same site.
