= Baha'i Temple Port Moresby =

Baha'i temple in Papua New Guinea

Baháʼí Temple of Port Moresby

Religion
- Affiliation: Baháʼí Faith
- District: National Capital District

Location
- Location: Tokarara, Port Moresby
- Country: Papua New Guinea

Architecture
- Completed: 2024

The Baháʼí Temple of Port Moresby is a House of Worship for the Baháʼí community that has been established in Port Moresby, Papua New Guinea. The inauguration ceremony of the newly constructed place of worship at Port Moresby Tokarara took place on Saturday, May 25, 2024.

== History ==
Construction of this building for the Baháʼí community began in 2019 and was completed in 2024. Tony Lakame, a leader of the National Spiritual Assembly of the Baháʼís, described the project as a significant achievement amidst the community's numerous service activities. Architects Henry Labb and Saeed Granfar from Papua have collaborated to create a design that reflects the Bahá'í principle of "unity in diversity." They have crafted a structure with universal appeal for a region characterized by immense linguistic and cultural diversity. This project showcases the skills of master woodcarvers from the Sepik region of Papua New Guinea. The lead sculptor for the project is Charles Sasa.

== Opening ceremony ==
Many people attended and celebrated the opening of the House of Worship, including the local National Capital District Governor, Powes Parkop. The establishment of the Baháʼí House of Worship reflects the unity and collective spirit of the Baháʼí community; it stands as a beacon of light and a symbol of harmony and prayer for the people. The year 2025 marks the Platinum Jubilee (70th anniversary) of the Baháʼí Faith in Papua New Guinea, commemorating its establishment in 1954, prior to the country's independence. This House of Worship was officially opened for public use on Monday, May 27, 2024. The confined temple has nine entrances designed in the style of House Thampuran so that people can easily come and go. At the event, Kessia Ruwe, a member of the Continental Board of Counsellors for Australasia, delivered an address. She had been appointed by the Universal House of Justice as its representative for the occasion. Ms. Ruwe had the pleasure of reading out a message sent by the House of Justice to the gathering.

== Population ==
There are over 60,000 Baháʼís is across more than 250 locations in Papua New Guinea—spanning the Highlands, Momose, and the southern regions. The Baha'i Faith is an independent world religion; like Christians, Baháʼís believing in one God.

== See also ==
- List of Baháʼí Houses of Worship
- Baháʼí House of Worship
- Baháʼí Faith in Oceania
- Baháʼí Faith in Papua New Guinea
