= Langenhain =

Village near Frankfurt, Germany

Coordinates: 50°06′20″N 8°23′52″E

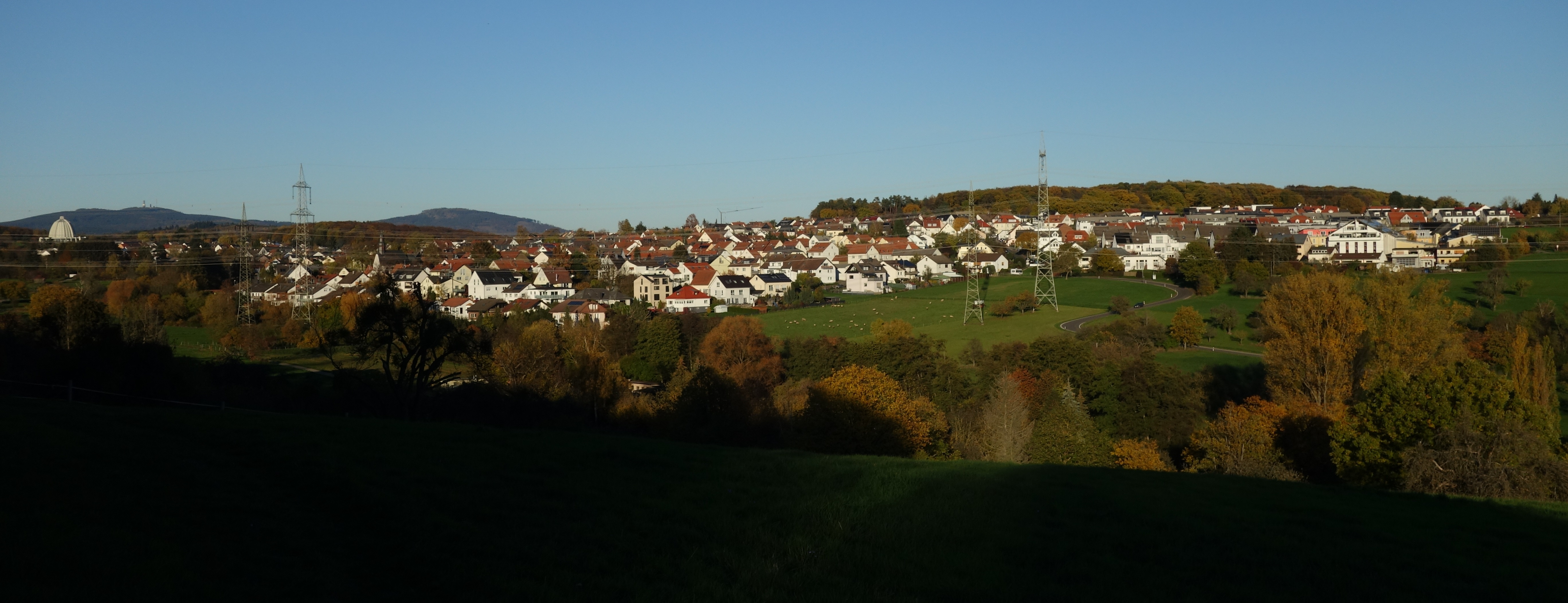
Langenhain as seen from the west

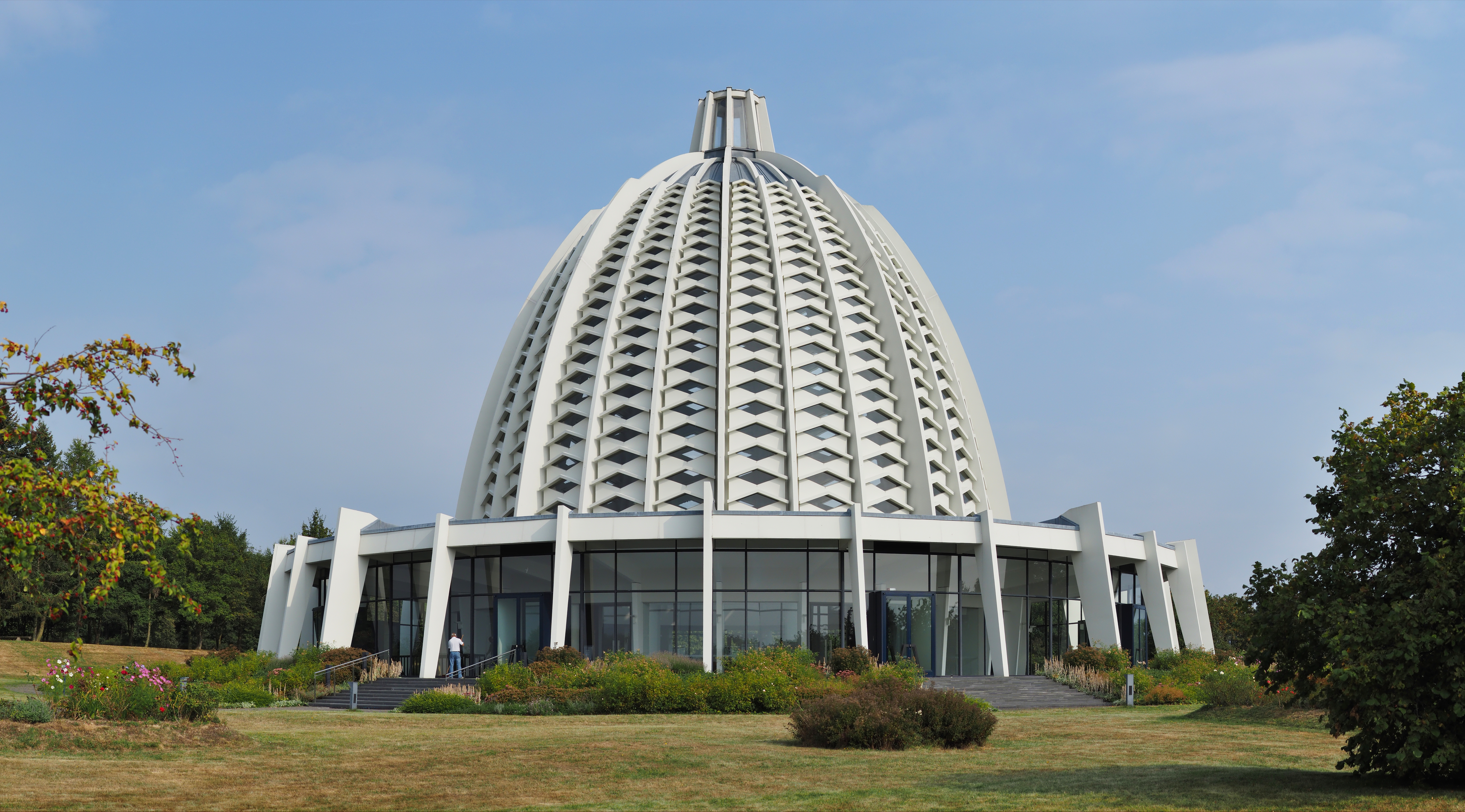
Bahá'í House of Worship in Langenhain

Langenhain (German pronunciation: [ˈlaŋənˌhaɪn]) is a village and a district in the town of Hofheim, Hesse, near Frankfurt, Germany. The village was incorporated into Hofheim in 1972, and it is in the north part of the city. The district currently has a population of around 4,000.

== History ==
Roman settlers first left behind a series of graves near 500 BC, and the first historical references to the town were in 1309.

Historical landmarks in the town include the Protestant church built in 1748, as well as some half-timbered houses. The newest and most prominent landmark in the district is the Baha'i House of Worship that was finished in 1964.
