= Baháʼí Faith in Trinidad and Tobago =

The Baháʼí Faith in Trinidad and Tobago begins with a mention by ʻAbdu'l-Bahá, then head of the religion, in 1916 as the Caribbean was among the places Baháʼís should take the religion to. The first Baháʼí to visit came in 1927 while pioneers arrived by 1956 and the first Baháʼí Local Spiritual Assembly was elected in 1957 In 1971 the first Baháʼí National Spiritual Assembly was elected. A count of the community then noted 27 assemblies with Baháʼís living in 77 locations. Since then Baháʼís have participated in several projects for the benefit of the wider community and between 2005 and 2010 various sources report near 1.2% of the country, about 10,000–16,000 citizens, are Baháʼís.

== Pre-history ==
ʻAbdu'l-Bahá, the son of the founder of the religion, wrote a series of letters, or tablets, to the followers of the religion in the United States in 1916-1917; these letters were compiled together in the book titled Tablets of the Divine Plan. The sixth of the tablets was the first to mention Latin American regions and was written on April 8, 1916, but was delayed in being presented in the United States until 1919—after the end of the First World War and the Spanish flu. The sixth tablet was translated and presented by Mirza Ahmad Sohrab on April 4, 1919, and published in Star of the West magazine on December 12, 1919.

His Holiness Christ says: Travel ye to the East and to the West of the world and summon the people to the Kingdom of God.…(travel to) the Islands of the West Indies, such as Cuba, Haiti, Puerto Rico, Jamaica, the Islands of the Lesser Antilles(which includes Trinidad and Tobago), Bahama Islands, even the small Watling Island, have great importance…

In 1927 Leonora Armstrong was the first Baháʼí to visit and give lectures about the Baháʼí Faith in many Latin American countries including Trinidad and Tobago as part of her plan to complement and complete Martha Root's unfulfilled intention of visiting all the Latin American countries for the purpose of presenting the religion to an audience.

=== Seven Year Plan and succeeding decades ===
Shoghi Effendi wrote a cable on May 1, 1936, to the Baháʼí Annual Convention of the United States and Canada, asking for the systematic implementation of ʻAbdu'l-Bahá's vision to begin. In his cable he wrote:

Appeal to assembled delegates ponder historic appeal voiced by ʻAbdu'l-Bahá in Tablets of the Divine Plan. Urge earnest deliberation with incoming National Assembly to insure its complete fulfillment. First century of Baháʼí Era drawing to a close. Humanity entering outer fringes most perilous stage its existence. Opportunities of present hour unimaginably precious. Would to God every State within American Republic and every Republic in American continent might ere termination of this glorious century embrace the light of the Faith of Baháʼu'lláh and establish structural basis of His World Order.

Following the May 1 cable, another cable from Shoghi Effendi came on May 19 calling for permanent pioneers to be established in all the countries of Latin America. The Baháʼí National Spiritual Assembly of the United States and Canada appointed the Inter-America Committee to take charge of the preparations. During the 1937 Baháʼí North American Convention, Shoghi Effendi cabled advising the convention to prolong their deliberations to permit the delegates and the National Assembly to consult on a plan that would enable Baháʼís to go to Latin America as well as to include the completion of the outer structure of the Baháʼí House of Worship in Wilmette, Illinois. In 1937 the First Seven Year Plan (1937–44), an international initiative, gave the American Baháʼís the goal of establishing the Baháʼí Faith in every country in Latin America. With the spread of American Baháʼís in Latin American, Baháʼí communities and Local Spiritual Assemblies began to form in 1938 across the Latin America.

A few other Baháʼís are known to have visited the islands before WWII. Mr. and Mrs. Dudley Blakeley visited on their way out from New York City and back during a tour of the Caribbean in 1936–37 with their visit resulting in a newspaper story. Wilfred Barton traveled the region and made contact with Trinidadians circa 1939. Anecdotes of a Trinidadian in Canada report a sensitivity to actually being treated equally; this likely is a report of Ralph Laltoo, a student from Trinidad, and son of a United Church Minister. He converted to the religion in October 1940 while in Canada. While the first known Trinidadian Baháʼí however returning to Trinidad in 1943 there was no Baháʼí community to be with him and he developed other connections while serving at Naparima College. When Hand of the Cause Dorothy Beecher Baker died in an airplane crash in 1954 in Europe she had been intending to travel to Trinidad. Another early contact between the Baháʼí Faith and a Trinidadian was noticed in 1954 by a policeman serving in Nassau.

Dr. Malcolm King promoted the religion while traveling among the islands starting in 1950. King taught the religion to Mrs. Harriet Phillip, sister to Dr. Cyril Turney, fellow convert and friend of King. Mrs. Phillip became the first person living in Trinidad to convert to the religion. Cyril Turney returned, in 1957, with his daughter, Viola, to Trinidad, where he lived in Belmont. His brother, Albert Turney, later converted and had the first Baháʼí funeral held in his name, when he died. With local converts and a few pioneers, the first Baháʼí Local Spiritual Assembly was subsequently elected in Port of Spain in 1957.

== Inter/National development ==
As far back as 1951 the Baháʼís had organized a regional National Assembly covering Mexico, Central America and the Antilles islands, and another for South America and nearby islands including Trinidad and Tobago. Further Baháʼís continued to travel to Trinidad and Tobago. Winston Evans toured the Caribbean including Trinidad in 1957. In 1962 Joel Caverly from Massachusetts came to Trinidad for the first time as a member of the music band from the Washington DC Navy School of Music. Israel Posner from Venezuela toured Trinidad promoting the religion in 1964 and was followed by two pioneers from England, Mr. and Mrs. John Firman. The Port of Spain assembly had lapsed but was reformed in 1965 - its members were: Mrs. Baptiste, John Firman, Mrs. Philips, Mrs. Firman, Mr. Paris, Miss Hopkinson, Mrs. George, Mr. Kedheroo, Mrs. Coure. That year the Trinidad Sunday Mirror published a photo of ʻAbdu'l-Bahá and an article titled "A Message of Peace and New Way of Life."

There were some developments in 1966 - reorganized as a regional national assembly among the Baháʼís of Leeward, Windward and Virgin Islands with its seat in Charlotte Amalie and Anthony Worley from Brazil was appointed as the twelfth member of the Auxiliary Board to foster the development of the religion in the Guianas and Trinidad and Tobago. During October 1966 a trip to ten islands including Trinidad was planned by Lorraine Landau, a pioneer in Barbados who was elected to the regional national assembly.

With further pioneers and converts by 1969 there were two additional local assemblies: Arima and San Fernando, and the number of Baháʼís had increased to 285.

Caverly returned and was living in Saint James where he and his fiancé became the first Baháʼí couple to be married in Trinidad and Tobago on August 4, 1970

Among the more notable visitors to the country were two Hands of the Cause, a select group of Baháʼís, appointed for life, whose main function is to serve the worldwide interests of the religion. First, Ruhiyyih Khanum visited for a few days in May. The second, Enoch Olinga, visited the country for five days at the beginning of September. In October he visited the island of Tobago for a few days as well. Both met with many local and regional dignitaries as well as meeting with Baháʼís and journalists.

In 1971 the first Baháʼí National Spiritual Assembly was elected. Its members were: Ramdass Ramkissoon, Don Swihert, Joel Caverly, Dr. Lavern Johnson, Leo Fraser, Edna Ruth Caverly, Nikou Amarsingh, Shamsi Sedegat, and Fitzroy Soukoo. A count of the community then noted 27 assemblies with Baháʼís living in 77 locations. That same year the national assembly established a correspondence course for Baháʼís to study the religion more formally and share community news.

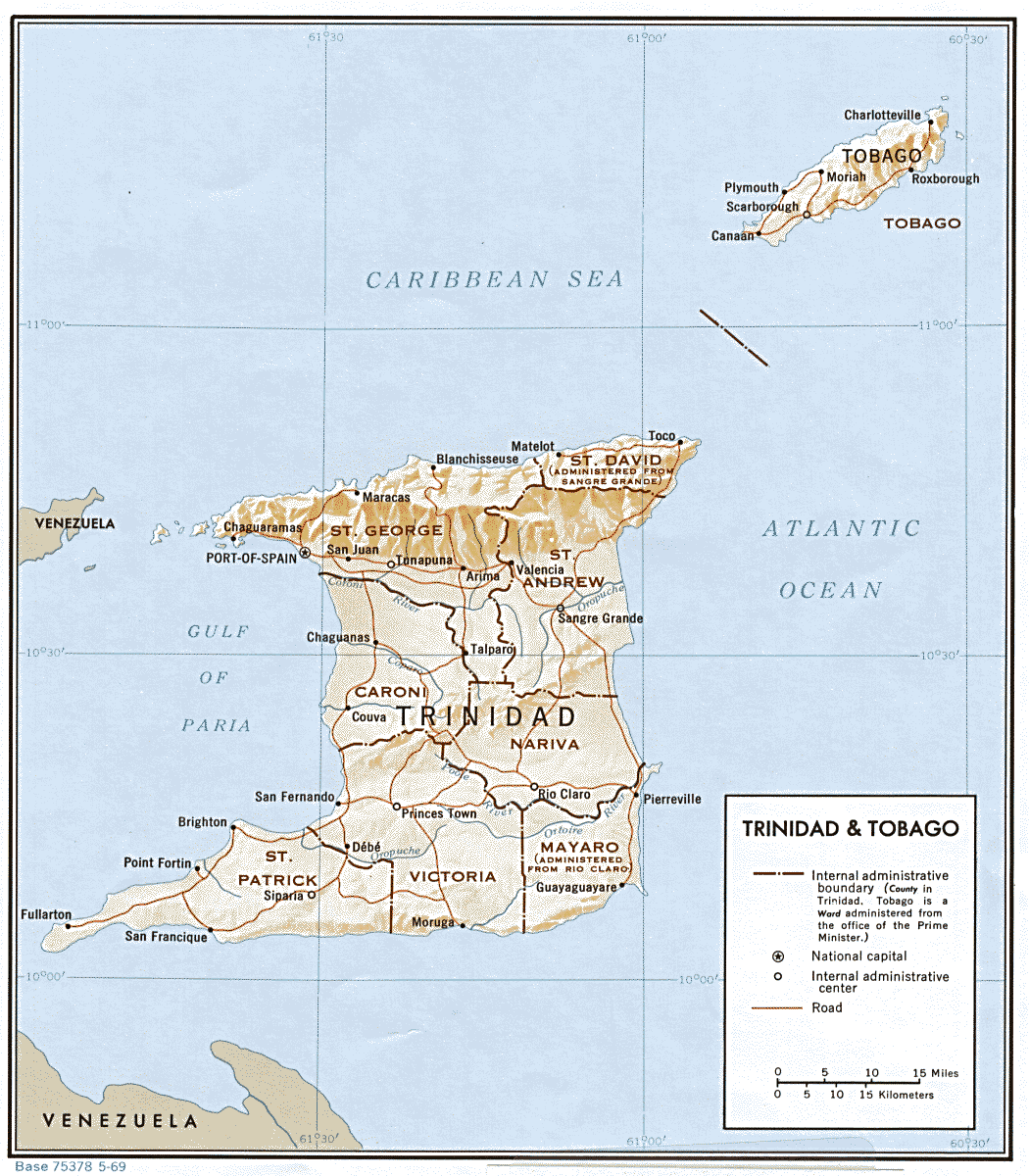
Map showing old counties of Trinidad

And a third Hand of the Cause visited in 1972 - Dr. Ugo Giachery came specifically as a representative from the Universal House of Justice, head of the religion since 1963, for its second national convention (with 17 delegates). Giachery's visit had coverage from Trinidadian newspaper and radio journalists and receptions for civic leaders. Diverse activities were then coordinated including - sending local pioneers to more localities across the country, donating several works to the national library system (Baháʼu'lláh and the New Era, Some Answered Questions, Divine Art of Living, and Paris Talks), interfaith meetings, a regular children's classes, and a regular six-minute contribution to a local radio station. The religion gained founding membership in Trinidad and Tobago's Inter-Religious Organization in 1972 lapsing only when it felt the organization was acting too political.

In 1975 the first national youth conference of the Baháʼís of Trinidad and Tobago was held in November attended by some 70 youth followed by a national conference on the promulgation of the religion in the country with 75 attendees from most of the administrative units of the country in 1976. The first Carib Indians of Trinidad to join the religion that year. Other Iranian pioneers were known in Trinidad in 1976. Meanwhile, Baháʼís from Trinidad and Tobago show up as visitors to Barbados in the 1960s and 70s. Hand of the Cause Enoch Olinga revisited in February 1977. Around this time three district Baháʼí centers were raised up - in Sangre Grande, San Fernando and one in Tobago - in addition to the national center and a surge in conversions. In 1978 Shirin Boman, serving as a Continental Counselor of the religion, toured the country with public and private meetings and interviews. The 1981 Baháʼí Naw-Rúz, or "New Year", was observed with the presence of a number of dignitaries and an early comment by a government official on the Persecution of Baháʼís in Iran.

An early implementation of the Ruhi Institute system occurred in 1982.

In 1983 the Baháʼís invited national civic leaders and university professors to a special dinner and viewed a film of the testimony in the US Congress of the incidence of the persecution of Baháʼís in Iran along with introductory materials on the religion.

=== Developmental projects ===
Since its inception the religion has had involvement in socio-economic development The Baháʼís of Trinidad and Tobago organized an observation of the UN International Year of the Child in 1979 and Baháʼís became formerly invited to work with one area school. An open Baháʼí Women's conference was held in 1979 with Baháʼí and non-Baháʼí women attending. A national children's conference was held in November 1980 with about 120 children plus adults and youth followed by a youth conference in December and conference on the growth of the religion in January 1981. Also in 1981 the Baháʼís participated in an interfaith meeting at the Port of Spain town hall. Three schools in the country formally introduced classes on the religion in 1981–2 school year.

Baháʼís continued to be active in developmental circles related to children.

== Modern community ==
In the 1990s youth conferences and proclamation events, and Ruhi Institute meetings multiplied.

The national center was renovated circa 1998–2000. A Minister of Trinidad and Tobago, Dr. Daphne Phillips, spoke at the official opening of the National Baháʼí Center in Port of Spain on 12 November 2000 addressing an audience of some 200 people.

Youth, women, and minorities are among those taking the lead in becoming tutors on Ruhi Institute courses in Trinidad and Tobago since 2006.

In 2008 the Baháʼí Community of Trinidad and Tobago promoted the United Nations International Day for the Elimination of Violence against Women through emphasizing moral education and equal partnerships between women and men.

The national library has a selection of Baháʼí literature.

Newspapers have published commemorations of the founding figures of the religion. or printed quotes on occasion.

=== Interfaith activities ===
The federal government published a series of stamps on local religions in 1992 in honor of the Inter-Religious Organization's steadfast interfaith activities. One of them was a symbol of the Baháʼí Faith - the Ringstone symbol. Through it Baháʼís have been a visible presence in the media. The Baháʼís has been mentioned as part of the discussions on national policy, cross-cultural events all while visibly not receiving government aide.

=== Arts ===
Several Trinidadian Baháʼís have been visible in the arts. Film Composer/Sound Designer/Musician/Music Producer Navid Lancaster is an active professional. Kathleen (Kathy) Farabi is a painter and a member of the Art Society of Trinidad & Tobago. Thunder Sowevhi is an artist, performer, dramatist and educator. Anne-Marie Brimacombe and her husband Peter Brimacombe are the Founding Directors of Arts Alive Tobago

=== Demographics ===
The Baháʼís are a small group in the country. In 2005/2010 the Association of Religion Data Archives (relying on World Christian Encyclopedia) estimated some 1.2% in Trinidad and Tobago - some 14–16,000 - were Baháʼís. The civic census does not specify Baháʼís as of 2011 and Baháʼís themselves claim somewhat smaller numbers at about 10,000 and within the civic boundaries of the possible 25 locations for local assemblies there are such assemblies in 21 of them.

== See also ==
- Culture of Trinidad and Tobago
- History of Trinidad and Tobago
