= Baháʼí Faith in Dominica =

The Baháʼí Faith in Dominica begins with a mention by ʻAbdu'l-Bahá, then head of the religion, in 1916 as Latin America being among the places Baháʼís should take the religion to. The island of Dominica was specifically listed as an objective for plans on spreading the religion in 1939 by Shoghi Effendi, who succeeded ʻAbdu'l-Baha as head of the religion. In 1983, William Nedden is credited with being the first pioneer to Dominica (he arrived on April 19, 1966) at the festivities associated with the inaugural election of the Dominican Baháʼís National Spiritual Assembly with Hand of the Cause, Dhikru'llah Khadem representing the Universal House of Justice. Later research records Ivor Ellard arrived two days before, April 17, 1966. The first Baháʼí Local Spiritual Assembly of Dominica was elected in 1976. Since then, Baháʼís have participated in several projects for the benefit of the wider community, and in 2001 various sources report between less than 1.4% and up to 1.7% of the island's approximately 70,000 citizens are Baháʼís.

== Pre-history ==
ʻAbdu'l-Bahá, the son of the founder of the religion, wrote a series of letters, or tablets, to the followers of the religion in the United States in 1916-1917; these letters were compiled together in the book titled Tablets of the Divine Plan. The sixth of the tablets was the first to mention Latin American regions and was written on April 8, 1916, but was delayed in being presented in the United States until 1919—after the end of the First World War and the Spanish flu. The first actions on the part of Baháʼí community towards Latin America were that of a few individuals who made trips to Mexico and South America near or before this unveiling in 1919, including Mr. and Mrs. Frankland, and Roy C. Wilhelm, and Martha Root. The sixth tablet was translated and presented by Mirza Ahmad Sohrab on April 4, 1919, and published in Star of the West magazine on December 12, 1919.

His Holiness Christ says: Travel ye to the East and to the West of the world and summon the people to the Kingdom of God.…(travel to) the Islands of the West Indies, such as Cuba, Haiti, Puerto Rico, Jamaica, the Islands of the Lesser Antilles (which includes Dominica), Bahama Islands, even the small Watling Island, have great importance…

=== Seven Year Plan and succeeding decades ===
Shoghi Effendi wrote a cable on May 1, 1936 to the Baháʼí Annual Convention of the United States and Canada, and asked for the systematic implementation of ʻAbdu'l-Bahá's vision to begin. In his cable he wrote:

Appeal to assembled delegates ponder historic appeal voiced by ʻAbdu'l-Bahá in Tablets of the Divine Plan. Urge earnest deliberation with incoming National Assembly to insure its complete fulfillment. First century of Baháʼí Era drawing to a close. Humanity entering outer fringes most perilous stage its existence. Opportunities of present hour unimaginably precious. Would to God every State within American Republic and every Republic in American continent might ere termination of this glorious century embrace the light of the Faith of Baháʼu'lláh and establish structural basis of His World Order.

Following the May 1 cable, another cable from Shoghi Effendi came on May 19 calling for permanent pioneers to be established in all the countries of Latin America. The Baháʼí National Spiritual Assembly of the United States and Canada appointed the Inter-America Committee to take charge of the preparations. During the 1937 Baháʼí North American Convention, Shoghi Effendi cabled advising the convention to prolong their deliberations to permit the delegates and the National Assembly to consult on a plan that would enable Baháʼís to go to Latin America as well as to include the completion of the outer structure of the Baháʼí House of Worship in Wilmette, Illinois. In 1937 the First Seven Year Plan (1937–44), which was an international plan designed by Shoghi Effendi, gave the American Baháʼís the goal of establishing the Baháʼí Faith in every country in Latin America. With the spread of American Baháʼís in Latin American, Baháʼí communities and Local Spiritual Assemblies began to form in 1938 across the rest of Latin America. Dominica was specifically listed as an objective for plans on spreading the religion in 1939. There is a record of an Elena Marsella, from Boston, in Dominica before June 1947 though other sources claim no Baháʼí had settled in Dominica through 1966 and other references of Marella show her in the Dominican Republic.

== Establishment ==
As far back as 1951 the Baháʼís had organized a regional National Assembly for the combination of Mexico, Central America and the Antilles islands. A Baháʼí made a trip to Dominica specifically to try to reach the Carib Indians on May 7, 1959. Pioneers arrived on April 17 (Ivor Ellard) and 19 (William Nedden), 1966. From 1966 the region was reorganized among the Baháʼís of Leeward, Windward and Virgin Islands with its seat in Charlotte Amalie with Baháʼí Local Spiritual Assemblies in neighboring islands to Dominica by the end of 1963. Nedden moved to other nearby islands. For five weeks in 1970 Hand of the Cause Ruhiyyih Khanum toured Caribbean Islands. On the island of Dominica she could only find one Baháʼí, a pioneer from Haita, as the rest were semi-nomadic. From 1972 the regional assembly was reorganized for Barbados, St. Lucia, Dominica, St. Vincent, Grenada and other Windward Islands. About December 1975 Bahá´ís again visited the Carib Indians; this time leaving them with Baháʼí literature. The first Baháʼí Local Spiritual Assembly of Dominica was elected in 1976 in St. George. In 1977 the first Carib joined the religion Joe Rabess. In 1978 assemblies were elected in St. Luke, St. Paul and St. Joseph. In 1979, Category 5 Hurricane David impacted Dominica and Errol (Bobby) Martin, who was vice-chairman of the National Spiritual Assembly of the Baha'is of the Leeward and Virgin Islands and an officer of the Montserrat Amateur Radio Society provided the lone link off the island for communication for some time.

Early in 1983 a team of Dominican Baháʼís set out to tour several cities and villages to makes contact isolated Baháʼís as well as promulgate the religion in new areas - they may have been the first time to do so composed only of Dominican citizens. Later in 1983 Hand of the Cause Dhikru'llah Khadem represented the Universal House of Justice, which succeeded Shoghi Effendi as the head of the religion, at the inaugural Convention for the National Spiritual Assembly of Dominica in Roseau. In October 1984 the Baháʼís of Roseau held a youth conference. In 1988 the National Assembly oversaw the translation and publication of the Hidden Words of Baháʼu'lláh.

== Modern community ==
Since its inception the religion has had involvement in socio-economic development beginning by giving greater freedom to women, promulgating the promotion of female education as a priority concern, and that involvement was given practical expression by creating schools, agricultural coops, and clinics. The religion entered a new phase of activity when a message of the Universal House of Justice dated 20 October 1983 was released. Baháʼís were urged to seek out ways, compatible with the Baháʼí teachings, in which they could become involved in the social and economic development of the communities in which they lived. Worldwide in 1979 there were 129 officially recognized Baháʼí socio-economic development projects. By 1987, the number of officially recognized development projects had increased to 1482. In 1982 the Baháʼís starting holding observances of World Religion Day and in 1986 the observance included a tribute of Martin Luther King Jr. by a Dominican official brought the largest audience so far and coverage by national radio news. Through the rest of 1986 the distribution of a publication of the Universal House of Justice, The Promise of World Peace reached a point where it or the author were noticed in a number of venues from non-Baháʼís until the Baháʼís themselves lead a procession through several villages and an art contest celebrating peace. In 1988 Carib Indians from Belize visited Dominica as part of a Trail of Light series of events Baháʼí Native Americans have been undertaking. Interviews of the travelers was taken and broadcast on Dominican radio several times as well as in print for the island newspaper. Public performances and private audiences between the visiting and native Caribs took place. In 1989 a translation in Creole of The Hidden Words was published and was recognized as a contribution to the preservation of the Dominican culture. In 1990 teams of Caribbean youth traveled among the islands and a team went to Dominica and worked for the Association for the Disabled. In 2000 Baháʼís of Dominica hosted a prayer gathering in an auditorium at the University of West Indies Centre in Roseau and accomplished literacy and education projects. The Dominican government supported the United Nations General Assembly vote on the "Situation of Human Rights in the Islamic Republic of Iran" (A/56/583/Add.3 Draft Resolution) on 19 December 2001.

=== Demographics ===
According to the 2001 population and housing census for Dominica, 1.4% of the population belonged to "other" religious groups, including the Baháʼí Faith. However, the 2001 World Christian Database reported 1.7% of Dominicans were Baháʼís.

== See also ==
- Baháʼí Faith by country
- Culture of Dominica
- History of Dominica
