= Baháʼí Faith in Brazil =

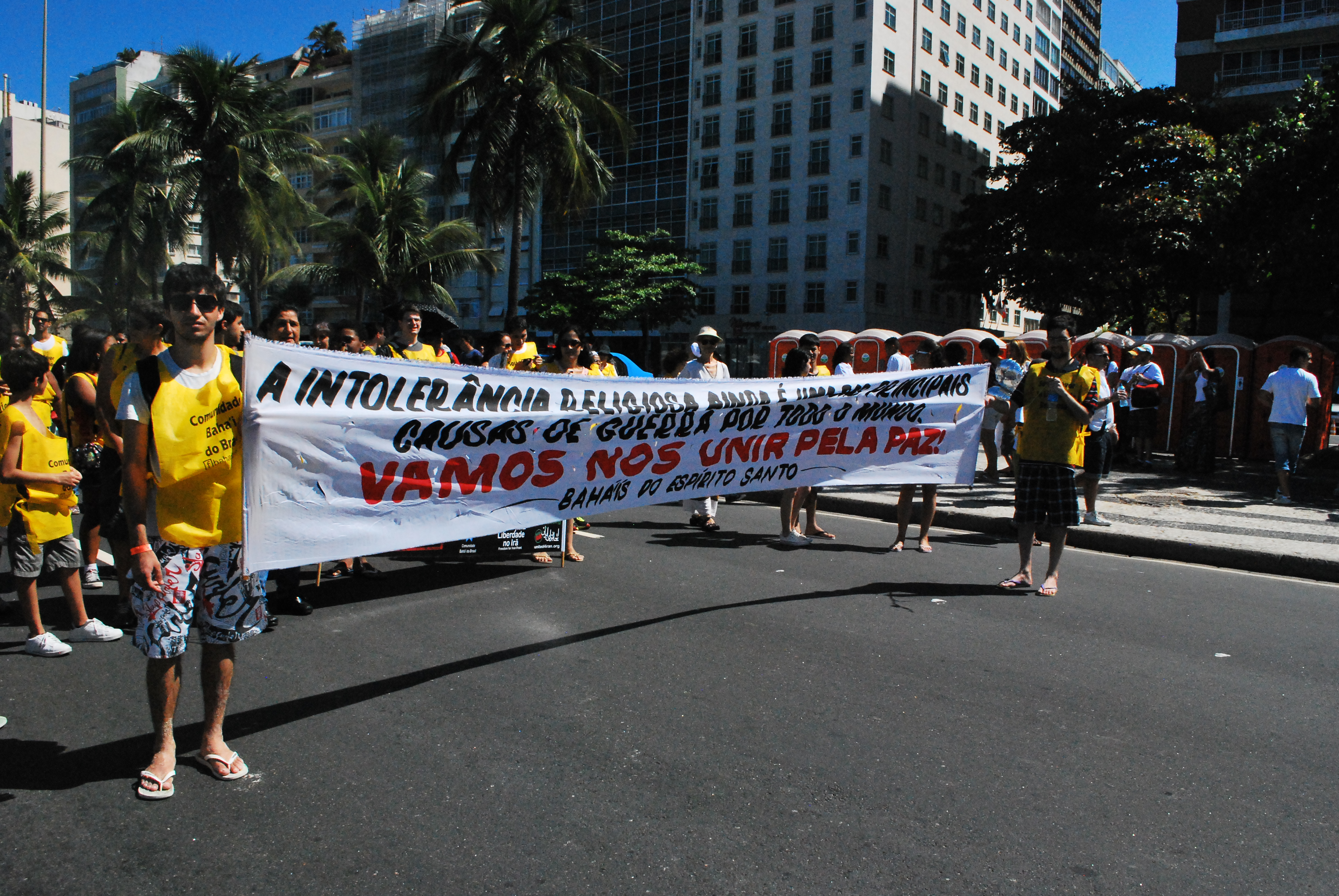
Baháʼí Faith in Brazil

The Baháʼí Faith in Brazil started in 1919 with Baháʼís first visiting the country that year, and the first Baháʼí Local Spiritual Assembly in Brazil was established in 1928. There followed a period of growth with the arrival of coordinated pioneers from the United States finding national Brazilian converts and in 1961 an independent national Baháʼí community was formed. During the 1992 Earth Summit, which was held in Brazil, the international and local Baháʼí community were given the responsibility for organizing a series of different programs, and since then the involvements of the Baháʼí community in the country have continued to multiply. The Association of Religion Data Archives (relying on World Christian Encyclopedia) estimated some 42211 Baháʼís in 2005.

== ʻAbdu'l-Bahá's Tablets of the Divine Plan ==
ʻAbdu'l-Bahá, the son of the founder of the religion, wrote a series of letters, or tablets, to the followers of the religion in the United States in 1916-1917; these letters were compiled together in the book titled Tablets of the Divine Plan. The sixth of the tablets was the first to mention Latin American regions and was written on April 8, 1916, but was delayed in being presented in the United States until 1919—after the end of the First World War and the Spanish flu. The first actions on the part of Baháʼí community towards Latin America were that of a few individuals who made trips to Mexico and South America near or before this unveiling in 1919, including Mr. and Mrs. Frankland, and Roy C. Wilhelm, and Martha Root. Root's travels, probably the first Baháʼí to Brazil, began in the summer of 1919 - stopping first in Brazil, then Argentina and Uruguay before setting out to cross the Andes mountains into Chile in winter. The sixth tablet was translated and presented by Mirza Ahmad Sohrab on April 4, 1919, and published in Star of the West magazine on December 12, 1919.

His Holiness Christ says: Travel ye to the East and to the West of the world and summon the people to the Kingdom of God. ... the republic of Mexico...to be familiar with the Spanish language...Guatemala, Honduras, Salvador, Nicaragua, Costa Rica, Panama and the seventh country Belize...Attach great importance to the indigenous population of America...Likewise the islands of ... Cuba, Haiti, Puerto Rico, Jamaica, ... Bahama Islands, even the small Watling Island...Haiti and Santo Domingo...the islands of Bermuda... the republics of the continent of South America—Colombia, Ecuador, Peru, Brazil, the Guianas, Bolivia, Chile, Argentina, Uruguay, Paraguay, Venezuela; also the islands to the north, east and west of South America, such as Falkland Islands, the Galapagòs, Juan Fernandez, Tobago and Trinidad. Likewise the city of Bahia, situated on the eastern shore of Brazil. Because it is some time that it has become known by this name, its efficacy will be most potent.

Following the Tablets and about the time of ʻAbdu'l-Bahá's passing in 1921, a few Baháʼís began moving to or at least visiting Latin America. The community in Brazil was established in 1921 when the first Baháʼí permanent resident in South America, Leonora Armstrong, arrived in Brazil in 1921. The second member of the community was Maude Mickle by April 1925. Following guidance from Shoghi Effendi, who was named as ʻAbdu'l-Bahá's successor, there was a rapid proliferation of Local Spiritual Assemblies around the world and a 1928 count listed Brazil having one of the 85 local Spiritual Assemblies worldwide.

== Seven Year Plan and succeeding decades ==
Shoghi Effendi wrote a cable on May 1, 1936 to the Baháʼí Annual Convention of the United States and Canada, and asked for the systematic implementation of ʻAbdu'l-Bahá's vision to begin. In his cable he wrote:

Appeal to assembled delegates ponder historic appeal voiced by ʻAbdu'l-Bahá in Tablets of the Divine Plan. Urge earnest deliberation with incoming National Assembly to insure its complete fulfillment. First century of Baháʼí Era drawing to a close. Humanity entering outer fringes most perilous stage its existence. Opportunities of present hour unimaginably precious. Would to God every State within American Republic and every Republic in American continent might ere termination of this glorious century embrace the light of the Faith of Baháʼu'lláh and establish structural basis of His World Order.

Following the May 1 cable, another cable from Shoghi Effendi came on May 19 calling for permanent pioneers to be established in all the countries of Latin America. The Baháʼí National Spiritual Assembly of the United States and Canada appointed the Inter-America Committee to take charge of the preparations. During the 1937 Baháʼí North American Convention, Shoghi Effendi cabled advising the convention to prolong their deliberations to permit the delegates and the National Assembly to consult on a plan that would enable Baháʼís to go to Latin America as well as to include the completion of the outer structure of the Baháʼí House of Worship in Wilmette, Illinois. In 1937 the First Seven Year Plan (1937–44), which was an international plan designed by Shoghi Effendi, gave the American Baháʼís the goal of establishing the Baháʼí Faith in every country in Latin America. With the spread of American Baháʼís in Latin American, Baháʼí communities and Local Spiritual Assemblies began to form in 1938 across the rest of Latin America. After a lapse of some years the assembly of Bahia was re-elected in 1940. By October 1941 Brazilian converts in Bahia included Donna Antonia, and Mr. and Mrs. Worley. Other pioneers in Brazil by 1946 included Jean Silver, Vivian Wesson, Virginia Orbison, Mr. and Mrs. Edward Bode, and Mr. and Mrs. Edmund J. Miessler. In 1946 the first assembly of Rio de Janeiro was elected. By June 1947 Brazil had three assemblies.

Following the election of the Regional Baháʼí Spiritual Assembly of South America in 1950, in 1957 this Assembly was split into two - basically northern/eastern South America with the Republics of Brazil, Peru, Colombia, Ecuador, and Venezuela, in Lima, Peru and one of the western/southern South America with the Republics of Argentina, Chile, Uruguay, Paraguay, and Bolivia in Buenos Aires, Argentina. Brazil established its independent Baháʼí National Spiritual Assembly in 1961. By 1963 there were 12 assemblies in Brazil: Bahia, Campinas, Curitiba, Lagoa Grande, Niterói, Porto Alegre, Recife, Rio de Janeiro, Santo André, São Caetano do Sul, Mogi Mirim, and São Paulo, plus an additional five communities with smaller groups of Baháʼís - Belém, Belo Horizonte, Brasília, Cachoeira Dourada and Poços de Caldas. In 1977 the first of the Macushi people join the religion.

== Baháʼí educational institutions ==
In 1980 the School of the Nations, "Escola das Nações", a bilingual (English-Portuguese) internationalist Baháʼí school was founded in Brasília. During the 1990 International Literacy Year the school cooperated with several communities on projects, one of which included sponsorship by the Secretary of Education of the Federal District. In 2007 this school had approximately 610 students enrolled and 90 teachers on the staff including assistants.

In the late 1980s and 1990s the Associação Monte Carmelo was formed as a community of educators, families, their children, and support staff forming a social and economic development non-governmental organization by the Ayvazian family who donated an 84,000 square metres (900,000 sq ft) rural property they owned near Porto Feliz to the Baháʼí community so that it might be used to serve the needs of Porto Feliz and its vicinity. After careful assessment and consultation with local leaders and authorities, it was established that the best use for the property would be to turn it into a center for the material, human and spiritual education of (currently 120) children and adolescents of all religious backgrounds and ethnic groups from low income families.

== 1992 Earth Summit ==
The international Baháʼí community was approached to help in the preparation for the 1992 Earth Summit that was held in Brazil. In August 1991, for example, the community was approached by Mr. Warren Lindner, Co-Chairman of the Global Forum, for assistance in setting up the Global Forum offices in Rio de Janeiro. "We were able to offer to the Forum the full-time assistance of Ms. Amanda Gurney, a Brazilian Baháʼí who is fluent in both English and Portuguese, as an assistant to Mr. Lindner," said Mr. Arturo. "Our hope was that early involvement by Baháʼís would help to infuse a unifying spirit to the Forum, and we believe this was accomplished." The Baháʼí International Community followed up several times to the Earth Summit efforts despite dwindling interest and pledged support around the world.

During the Earth Summit the Baháʼí International Community addressed the Global Forum which ran alongside the governmental meetings as well as playing a major role in ancillary activities including the Peace Monument itself - commissioned by the Baháʼí International Community and came to be viewed as the symbol of the Earth Summit which is located in the green areas of Goiânia. The Baháʼís in Brazil and beyond also aided in the preparation and production of a book of artwork and essays by children from around the world about the need for greater environmental protection and for peace. This book, entitled Tomorrow Belongs to the Children, was sent to all heads of state in 1993. The Baháʼís sponsored a day-long symposium, held at the Global Forum, on "Values and Institutions for a Sustainable and Ever-Advancing World Civilization." The Baháʼís were also given the responsibility for organizing a series of evening music and cultural programs for the 1992 Global Forum. The "Evening Series in the Park" took place every night during the Global Forum in the Flamengo Park Amphitheater.

== Current demographics ==
In 1990 the first assembly entirely composed of indigenous people in Brazil was elected from the Mura people in Beruri. In 2002 Baháʼís claimed there were around 55,000 Baháʼís in Brazil, and 66 Local Spiritual Assemblies. In 2007-8 local Baháʼí communities with electronic contact exist in Barretos, Bauru, Belo Horizonte, Blumenau, Brasília, Cachoeira do Bom Jesus - Florianópolis, Goiabeiras, Lauro de Freitas, Londrina, Manaus, Mogi Guaçu, Natal, Porto Feliz, Recife, Rio Branco, Rio de Janeiro, Santo André, São Paulo, São Sebastião, and Vila Velha. The Association of Religion Data Archives (relying on World Christian Encyclopedia) estimated some 42211 Baháʼís in 2005.

== Diverse involvements ==
Since its inception the religion has had involvement in socio-economic development beginning by giving greater freedom to women, promulgating the promotion of female education as a priority concern, and that involvement was given practical expression by creating schools, agricultural coops, and clinics. The religion entered a new phase of activity when a message of the Universal House of Justice dated 20 October 1983 was released. Baháʼís were urged to seek out ways, compatible with the Baháʼí teachings, in which they could become involved in the social and economic development of the communities in which they lived. Worldwide in 1979 there were 129 officially recognized Baháʼí socio-economic development projects. By 1987, the number of officially recognized development projects had increased to 1482. The modern Brazilian Baháʼí community has members and activities and external interests in issues affecting the religion. And the community continues programs of outreach. In 1986 the Brazilian Society of Physicians for Peace was formed on the initiative of a number of Baháʼí physicians (some 120 medical professionals attend the convocation.) In 2002 the National Spiritual Assembly prepared a list of some 44 names of national religious leaders, theologians, and religious academics, and then sent the letter Letter to the World's Religious Leaders out by mail or personal delivery. As a second step, some 330 copies of the letter were sent to the local Spiritual Assemblies in Brazil, for distribution to local religious leaders. "In Brazilian society, religious divisions are a problem," said Roberto Eghrari, secretary of external affairs for the Brazilian National Spiritual Assembly. "There are tensions between evangelical groups and other Christian denominations, and between Christians and Afro-based religious groups. So we believe the distribution of this message is very timely, that it has the potential to bring new understandings." Mr. Eghrari said religious leaders have acted with much appreciation. Several groups had indicated a desire for some kind of collaboration or follow-up on the message with the Brazilian Baha'i community. "It is not just a matter of people reading the message. They want to put it into action."

=== People ===
There are artists and academics and professionals who are Baháʼís - award-winning Flora Purim is a Brazilian jazz singer living in the United States who began her career in Brazil during the early 1960s and is known mainly for her work in the jazz fusion style. In September 2002, Brazil's President Fernando Henrique Cardoso named Purim to the "Order of Rio Branco", one of Brazil's highest honors for those who have significantly contributed to the promotion of Brazil's international relations. Paulo Amorim Cardoso accepted the Baháʼí Faith in Brazil in 1971 and helped found the Baháʼí Esperanto-League. Through the 1990s Baháʼí Roland Zwicker has been a mime and theatre actor in Brazil, France, and the United States. In 1992 Siron Franco, who first declared his belief in Baháʼu'lláh during a live radio interview broadcast throughout Brazil, designed the Peace Monument for the Earth Summit and has continued to work in painting, ceramics, sculpture. From 2002 Albertina Lourenci has been a sustainability software architect and Baháʼí, a post-doctorate researcher under the supervising of Professor João Antonio Zuffo of University of São Paulo 2007 Brazilian television personality Shideh Granfar uses the positive attitude of the Baha'i teachings as her inspiration of her style.

=== Other Baháʼí organizations ===
Baháʼís and Baháʼí institutions have founded or established a number of organizations promoting service to the community. In 1985, the South American branch of the Association of Baháʼí Studies first me in Brazil. In 1990 the Brazilian Society of Educators for Peace, founded by Baháʼís, was recognized by the Amazonas State government. In January 2002 the Ninth Congress of the Baha'i Youth Movement of the Americas with 600 youth from 15 countries met at the Soltanieh Baháʼí Educational Center outside Mogi Mirim.

==== ADCAM ====
The Associação para o Desenvolvimento Coesivo da Amazônia (The Association for the Cohesive Development of the Amazon - ADCAM) started in 1984 organized by the National Spiritual Assembly of the Baháʼís from Brazil. ADCAM began serving in two different areas: in the agricultural area, through its Djalal Egrhari Polytechnical Agricultural Institute– IPRAM, in Iranduba, which provides formal education in its Elementary School and in the urban area, ADCAM established what became the Mansrour Vocational Institute, in the east zone of Manaus, the only such home in the city, inaugurated on September 7, 1989. The Brazilian Ministry of Education made a grant, equivalent to some US$850,000 in 2001 to the Manrour Vocational Institute to expand it to serve 4000 students. In 2003, because of the new law LDB 9394/96, regulating the Graduate Status for Teaching, ADCAM with the authorization of Ministry of Education inaugurated the Táhirih College with a B. A. course in Pedagogy to graduate teachers who will become engaged in social development. In November 2005 Táhirih College received its official accreditation as a College.

=== External interests in the religion ===
On May 28, 1992, the Chamber of Deputies of Brazil met in special session to commemorate the centenary of the passing of Baháʼu'lláh, whose influence was acknowledged as becoming increasingly familiar feature of the world's social and intellectual landscape. There was an official postage cancel released on the occasion as well. In 1996 the Chamber of Deputies of Brazil held a special solemn session to honor Ruhiyyih Khanum, who was visiting Brazil to commemorate the 75th anniversary of the establishment of the Baháʼí Faith in Brazil. In 2000 Brazil agreed to take in 30 families facing religious persecution in their native Iran. National Justice Secretary Elizabeth Sussekind said that the resettlement was part of an agreement with the UN High Commissioner for Refugees. Since the initial arrest of members of the leadership of the Baháʼís in Iran in March 2008 Brazilian Congressmen have been speaking out: Luiz Couto - 13 March, Fernando Ferro - 8 April, Luiz Couto again - 3 July, Boy Alencar - 13 August, Bullet Rocha - 13 August, Luiz Couto again - 8 October, Geraldo Resende - 16 October and Pompeo de Mattos and Carlos Abicalil November 19. The issue was raised again in Brazil 17 February 2009 when de Mattos released an open letter to the legal authorities of the Islamic Republic of Iran through the Brazilian Congress' Commission for Human Rights and Minorities. See Persecution of Baháʼís.

== See also ==
- Religion in Brazil
- History of Brazil
