= Baháʼí Faith in Alaska =

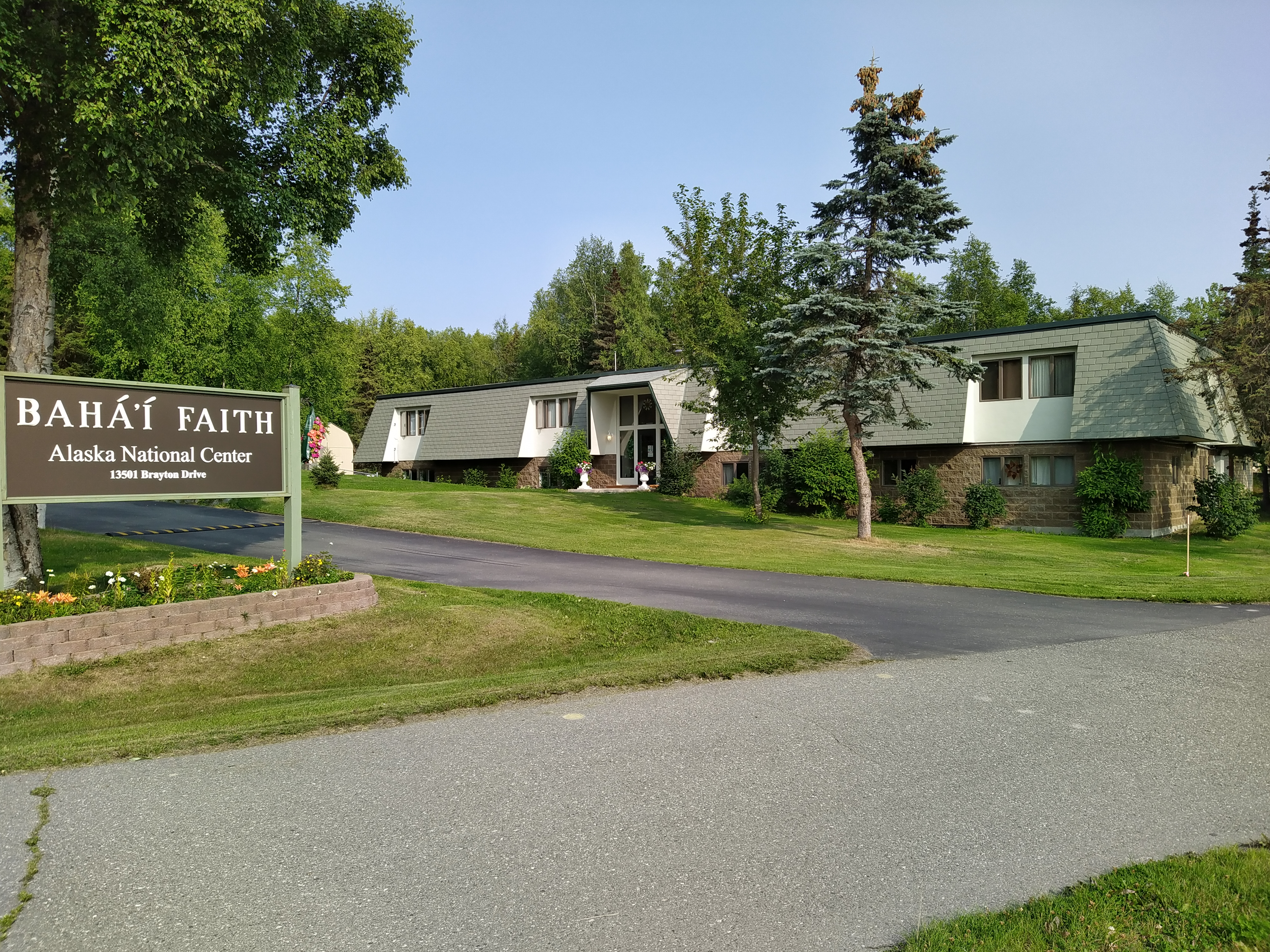
Baháʼí Faith Alaska headquarters, located alongside the Seward Highway on the far southern edge of Anchorage proper.

The Baháʼí Faith was introduced to Alaska before the 1915 arrival of the first member of that religion to move there. Over time the community of Baháʼís grew and established local governing councils called spiritual assemblies in several cities.

== History ==
Agnes Alexander was the first member of the Baháʼí Faith to ever visit Alaska. She was on her way back to Hawaii when she made several stops in Southeast Alaska and gave several talks, as recorded by Aseyeh Allen.

The first Baháʼí to move to Alaska and live here was Margaret Green. She lived in Juneau from June 16, 1915, to June 6, 1918, and worked as a librarian. The first Baháʼí pioneer in Alaska, in answer to The Tablets of the Divine Plan, was Orcella Rexford. The first person to become a Baháʼí in Alaska was Dr. Gayne V. Gregory, who later married Rexford. The other first new Baháʼí was Victoria Robarts.

Several Baháʼís traveled to Alaska in the 1920s, but there was very little activity. In 1939, Honor Kempton arose in answer to a letter from Shoghi Effendi written to the Baháʼís of North America where he asked them to move to the nine states, provinces and territories of the United States and Canada that still had no Baháʼís in them. Since the word "anchorage" was mentioned in the letter Honor decided to move to Anchorage, Alaska. She first settled in Juneau, but quickly relocated to Anchorage where she lived from May 1939 to 1947. She operated a bookshop called The Book Cache, which was called ''The cultural center of Alaska" by the Governor. The other Baháʼí who answered Shoghi Effendi's request was Betty Becker who moved to Juneau. In 1941, Janet Whitenack became the first Alaskan Baháʼí in this period that was to mark the permanent establishment of the Baháʼí Faith in Alaska. Whitenack married Verne Stout in 1945, and they had the first marriage of Baháʼís in Alaska.

The first Baháʼí Local Spiritual Assembly was established in Alaska in Anchorage in 1943, and Local Spiritual Assemblies in Fairbanks (1955), Tanana Valley (1956), Ketchikan (1956) and Juneau (1957) followed. In 1957 the National Spiritual Assembly of the Baháʼís of Alaska was formed. Shoghi Effendi, head of the religion from 1921 to his death in 1957, wrote many letters to the Baháʼís of Alaska - these were compiled and published in High Endeavours: Messages to Alaska in 1976.

By the 1980s, the Baháʼí Faith was established in over 200 localities in Alaska with more than 60 Local Spiritual Assemblies, 26 of which were legally incorporated. There are currently approximately 1,500 Baháʼís in Alaska. And there have been conferences. In 1986 North American Indian Baháʼí Lee Brown gave a talk at the 1986 Baháʼí Continental Indigenous Council held at Tanana Valley which was recorded — it includes his interpretation of Native American, especially Hopi, prophecies.

== See also ==
- Baháʼí Faith in North America
