= Baháʼí Faith in South America =

Religion of an area

The Baháʼí Faith was introduced to South America in 1919. There are Baháʼí Houses of Worship in Chile and Colombia, completed in 2016 and 2018 respectively. The Ruhi Institute, whose courses are now used by Baháʼís around the world, was originally created by the Colombian Baháʼí community.

== Early history ==
The Baháʼí Faith was introduced into South America in 1919 when Martha Root made an extended trip to Brazil, Argentina, Chile, and Peru. She introduced the Baháʼí Faith to Esperantists and Theosophical groups and visited local newspapers to ask them to publish articles about the Baháʼí Faith. The first Baháʼí permanently resident in South America was Leonora Armstrong, who arrived in Brazil in 1921. The first Seven Year Plan (1937–44), an international plan organized by then head of the Baháʼí Faith, Shoghi Effendi, gave the American Baháʼís the goal of establishing the Baháʼí Faith in every country in Latin America (that is, settling at least one Baháʼí or converting at least one native). In 1950, the National Spiritual Assembly of the Baháʼís of South America was first elected, and then in 1957 this Assembly was split into two – basically northern/eastern South America with the Republics of Brazil, Peru, Colombia, Ecuador, and Venezuela, in Lima, Peru and one of the western/southern South America with the Republics of Argentina, Chile, Uruguay, Paraguay, and Bolivia in Buenos Aires, Argentina. By 1963, most countries in South America had their own National Spiritual Assembly.

== Later developments ==
Among the more significant developments across South and Central America for the religion has been the building of the last continental Baháʼí House of Worship in Chile, a program of developing Baháʼí radio stations in several countries, relationships with indigenous populations, development programs like FUNDAEC, and the Ruhi institute process began in Colombia.

=== House of Worship in Chile ===
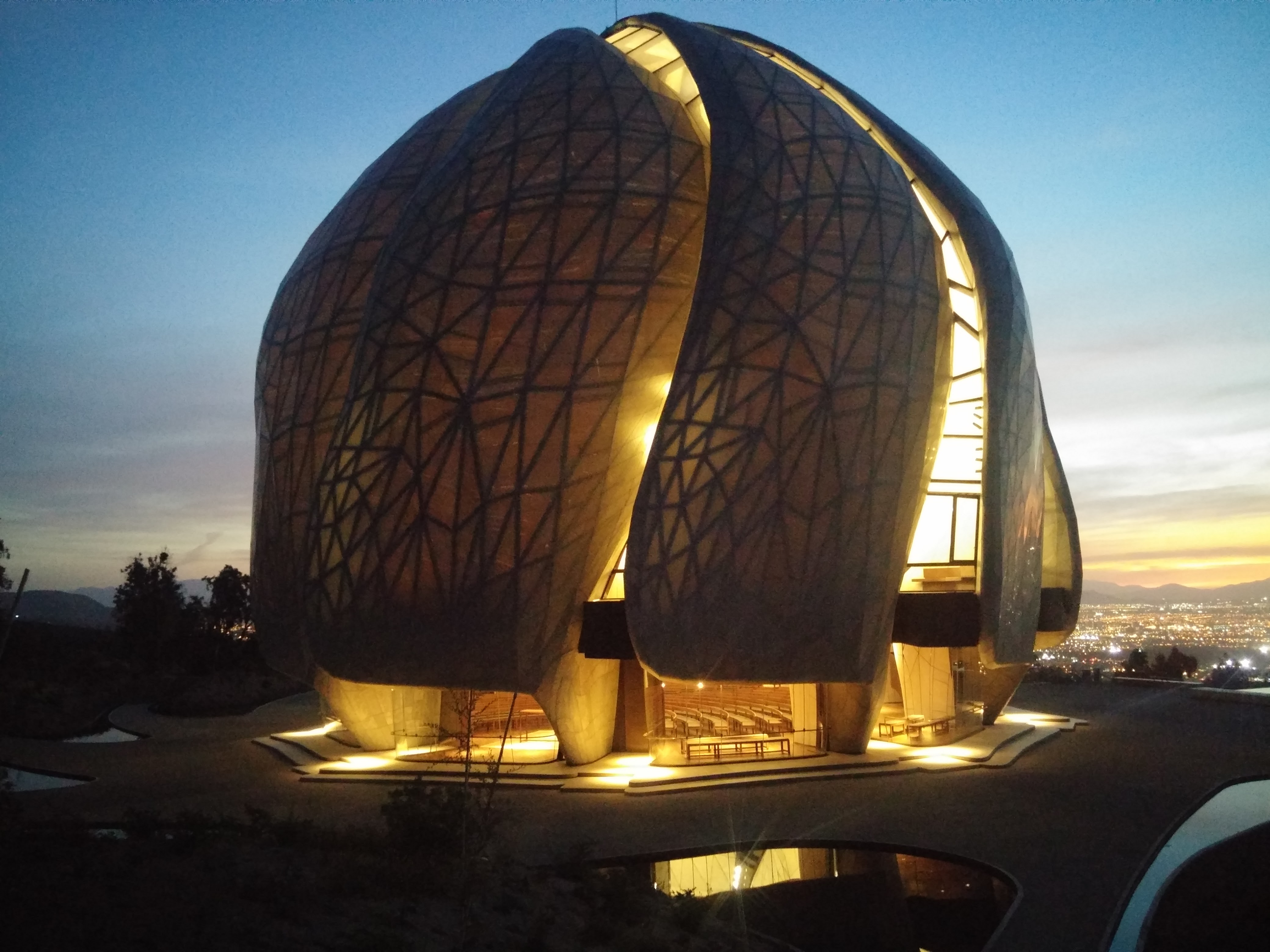
The House of Worship in Santiago, Chile

In late 2002, the National Spiritual Assembly of the Baháʼís of Chile and the Universal House of Justice, the international governing body of the Baháʼís, announced a competition for the design of the first Baháʼí House of Worship for South America, to be built near Santiago (33.476423°S 70.511649°W) though the general decision to have the first temple of South America was set since 1953. The selected design was designed by Siamak Hariri of Toronto, Canada, and fabrication of components began in 2007. The temple was inaugurated in 2016. Its sides are composed of translucent panels of alabaster and cast glass. The interior structure is a lattice structure of steel supporting the inside of the upper dome.

=== Baháʼí radio ===
Since the 1960s there has been interest in mass media to promote and support development projects. This was followed by a view that the service of the community of the religion was through the participation of the community and spread of information. At a series of UNESCO conferences Baháʼís consulted and the consensus of opinion lead to advancing the issues until in 1978 a conference was held in Ecuador. At that conference researchers summarized developments along these lines and noted challenges such projects faced and a few ways such projects failed while also noting that village radio stations seemed to be a nice fit because of the necessary quality of communication in a society. The Baháʼí Radio project in Ecuador served as a means to study the process of the two trends by setting up a community radio station of the community for the community – and may have been the first such project in all Latin America aimed at serving the campesinos as its primary purpose with development oriented programming. It mixed national music forms with public service features (lost and found, messages to individuals, official communications, but looking to develop more.) The project was studied through faculty from Northwestern University from 1980 to 1982, and briefly in 1983, and reviewed Baháʼí Radio projects in Peru and Bolivia as well and resulted in a PhD by Kurt John Hein in 1985 following which he took up service at WLGI Radio Baháʼí.

Since 1977, Baháʼís have established several radio stations worldwide, particularly in South America. Programmes broadcast may include local news, music, topics related to socio-economic and community development, educational programmes focusing on indigenous language and culture, and Baháʼí introductory and deepening material.

=== FUNDAEC ===
FUNDAEC, the acronym in Spanish for "The Foundation for the Application and Teaching of the Sciences", is a non-profit, non-governmental organization that focuses on training and development in the rural areas of Colombia and other countries in Latin America. It was created in 1974 in Colombia by a group of scientists and professionals led by Farzam Arbab, who was then a visiting professor to the University of Valle. In 1974 FUNDAEC was initiated as a Colombian NGO based on Baháʼí consultations with Colombians starting in the 1970s which developed a number of projects like a secondary curriculum centered on skill development for living in the countryside and minimized urbanization for example. According to Gustav Correa, director of FUNDAEC, it was originally inspired by a quotation from Baháʼu'lláh – "Baha'u'llah talks about man as 'a mine rich in gems of inestimable value.' He says that 'education can, alone, cause it to reveal its treasures, and enable mankind to benefit therefrom.'" Its founding ideals included not seeing the people as masses of undernourished people, overwhelmed by problems and needs-housing, employment, sanitation, education, but instead to consider the participants of its programs as irreplaceable resources in a self-sustaining process of change. FUNDAEC was officially instituted as a private development foundation based in Cali, and has developed a number of development projects centered around a goal that rural populations should not only benefit from higher education, but should also actively participate in creating and generating knowledge and technologies, to improve their quality of life and standard of living FUNDAEC sought to dispel the image of the poor farmer whose life must be planned and managed by more privileged members of society.

=== Ruhi Institute ===
The Ruhi Institute is an educational institution, operating under the guidance of the National Spiritual Assembly of the Baháʼí Faith in Colombia. The general idea of an institute in Baháʼí terms originates with the beginning of the Nine Year Plan (starting in 1964) designated by the Universal House of Justice. The institute or training institute was especially for countries where large-scale expansion was taking place to meet the needs of the thousands who were entering the religion. At that time, the emphasis was on acquiring a physical facility to which group after group of newly enrolled believers would be invited to attend deepening courses. Over the years, in conjunction with these institutes as well as independent of them, a number of courses—referred to, for example, as weekend institutes, five-day institutes, and nine-day institutes— were developed for the purpose of promulgating the fundamental verities of the religion and how to serve it. Since its founding the program of courses developed first in Colombia has been adopted for work around the world and across age groups and studied in a variety of applications.

== Among indigenous peoples ==
The Baháʼí Faith and Native Americans has a history reaching back to the lifetime of ʻAbdu'l-Bahá, the head of the religion near the turn of the 20th century, and has multiplied its relationships across the Americas. Individuals have joined the religion and institutions have been founded to serve Native Americans and have Native Americans serve on Baháʼí institutions.

By 1963, Baháʼí sources claimed that members of some 83 tribes of Native Americans had joined the religion. Among Central and South American indigenous people there are substantial populations of Baháʼís. An informal summary of the Wayuu (a tribe living in La Guajira Desert) community in 1971 showed about 1,000 Baháʼís.

Relationships between North American and South American indigenous populations have been fostered by North American indigenous people. The idea for a "Trail of Light" occurred during preparations for the first Baháʼí Native Council in 1978. Another inspiration for the Trail of Light was the concept of promulgating the religion among the indigenous peoples in the Pacific Rim that was described by the Hand of the Cause Rahmátu'llah Muhájir in 1978. The Trail of Light, also known as Camino del Sol, was defined as a process whereby native Baháʼís engaged with diverse native peoples about a number of issues including promulgating their religion as well as organizing councils for the people and encouraged discovery of mutual cultural links across the native peoples. The first Trail of Light traveling trip by 22 members of the religion occurred spontaneously immediately after the council. In 1985 the Trail of Light project began its work in Colombia.

== By country ==
=== Bolivia ===
The Baháʼí Faith in Bolivia begins with references to the country in Baháʼí literature as early as 1916. The first Baháʼí to arrive in Bolivia was in 1940 through the beginning of the arrival of coordinated pioneers, people who chose to move for the growth of the religion, from the United States. That same year the first Bolivian joined the religion. The first Baháʼí Local Spiritual Assembly was elected in La Paz in 1945 and the first Indian formally joined the religion in 1956 which soon spread widely among that subculture. The community elected an independent National Spiritual Assembly in 1961. By 1963 there were hundreds of local assemblies. The Baháʼí Faith is currently the largest international religious minority in Bolivia. The largest population of Baháʼís in South America is in Bolivia, where there is a Baháʼí population estimated at 217,000 in 2005 according to the Association of Religion Data Archives.

=== Brazil ===
The Baháʼí Faith in Brazil started in 1919 with Baháʼís first visiting the country that year, and the first Baháʼí Local Spiritual Assembly in Brazil was established in 1928. There followed a period of growth with the arrival of coordinated pioneers from the United States finding national Brazilian converts and in 1961 an independent national Baháʼí community was formed. During the 1992 Earth Summit, which was held in Brazil, the international and local Baháʼí community were given the responsibility for organizing a series of different programs, and since then the involvements of the Baháʼí community in the country have continued to multiply. The Association of Religion Data Archives (relying on World Christian Encyclopedia) estimated some 42,211 Baháʼís in 2005.

=== Chile ===
The Baháʼí Faith was first mentioned Chile in Baháʼí sources as early as 1916, with Baháʼís visiting as early as 1919 but the community wasn't founded in Chile until 1940 with the beginning of the arrival of coordinated pioneers from the United States finding national Chilean converts and achieved an independent national community in 1963. In 2002 this community was picked for the establishment of the first Baháʼí Temple of South America which the community is still prosecuting.

The permanent Chilean Baháʼí community dates from the arrival of Marcia Stewart Atwater, born in 1904 in Pasadena, California, who arrived in Chile on 7 December 1940. The first Chilean to accept the Baháʼí Faith was 12-year-old Paul Bravo, which was followed by his family becoming Baháʼís. Then in 1943, Chile's first Baháʼí Local Spiritual Assembly was elected. Following the election of the Regional Baháʼí Spiritual Assembly of South America in 1950, Chile established its independent Baháʼí National Spiritual Assembly in 1961. The Association of Religion Data Archives (relying mostly on the World Christian Encyclopedia) estimated some 26,000 Baháʼís in 2005.

=== Colombia ===
The Baháʼí Faith in Colombia begins with references to the country in Baháʼí literature as early as 1916, with Baháʼís visiting as early as 1927. The first Colombian joined the religion in 1929 and the first Baháʼí Local Spiritual Assembly was elected in Bogotá in 1944 with the beginning of the arrival of coordinated pioneers from the United States and achieved an independent National Spiritual Assembly in 1961. By 1963 there were eleven local assemblies. In the 1980s institutions were developed in Colombia that have influenced activities inside and independent of the religion in other countries: FUNDAEC and the Ruhi Institute. The Association of Religion Data Archives (relying mostly on the World Christian Encyclopedia) estimated some 70,000 Baháʼís in 2005. The world's second local Baháʼí House of Worship was opened in Colombia in 2018.

=== Guyana ===
The Baháʼí Faith in Guyana was first mentioned in Baháʼí sources as early as 1916, the first Baháʼís visited as early as 1927 but the community was founded in Guyana in 1953 with the beginning of the arrival of coordinated pioneers and from Guyanese converts. The community elected the first BaháʼíLocal Spiritual Assembly in 1955 and an independent National Spiritual Assembly in 1977. The country has experienced large migrations and the size of the Baháʼí community has also dramatically changed. In the most recent cycle the 2002 national census showed about 0.1%, or 500, Baháʼís mostly in three of its Regions though Baháʼís were noted in every Region. However, by 2005 the Association of Religion Data Archives estimated there were some 13,000 Baháʼís. Baháʼís are now widely distributed across Guyana and represent all major racial groups and regions. The Baháʼí community, while relatively small, is well known for its emphasis on unity, non-involvement in politics and its work in issues such as literacy and youth issues.

=== Paraguay ===
The Baháʼí Faith in Paraguay begins after ʻAbdu'l-Bahá, then head of the religion, mentioned the country in 1916. Paraguayan Maria Casati was the first to join the religion in 1939 when living in Buenos Aires. The first pioneer to settle in Paraguay was Elizabeth Cheney late in 1940 and the first Baháʼí Local Spiritual Assembly of Asunción was elected in 1944. By 1961 Paraguayan Baháʼís had elected the first National Spiritual Assembly and by 1963 there were 3 local assemblies plus other communities. Recent estimates of Baháʼís mention 5,500 or 10,600 Baháʼís though the state census does not mention the Baháʼís.

=== Peru ===
The Baháʼí Faith in Peru begins with references to Peru in Baháʼí literature as early as 1916, with the first Baháʼís visiting as early as 1919. A functioning community wasn't founded in Peru until the 1930s with the beginning of the arrival of coordinated pioneers from the United States which progressed into finding national Peruvian converts and achieved an independent national community in 1961. The Association of Religion Data Archives (relying mostly on the World Christian Encyclopedia) estimated some 41,900 Baháʼís in 2005.

=== Uruguay ===
The Baháʼí Faith in Uruguay begins after ʻAbdu'l-Bahá, then head of the religion, mentioned the country in 1916. The first Baháʼí to enter the country was Martha Root in 1919. The first pioneer to settle there was Wilfrid Barton early in 1940 and the first Baháʼí Local Spiritual Assembly of Montevideo was elected in 1942. By 1961 Uruguayan Baháʼís had elected the first National Spiritual Assembly and by 1963 there were three Local Assemblies plus other communities. Circa 2001 there was an estimated 4,000 Baháʼís in Uruguay. The Association of Religion Data Archives (relying on World Christian Encyclopedia) estimated some 7,300 Baháʼís in 2005.

== See also ==
- Bahá'í Faith by country
- Baháʼí Faith and Native Americans
- Religion in South America
- Hinduism in South America
