= Baháʼí Faith in America =

Baháʼí Faith in America may refer to:

- Baháʼí Faith in Central America
- Baháʼí Faith in North America
- Baháʼí Faith in South America
