= Baháʼí Faith in Jamaica =

The Baháʼí Faith in Jamaica begins with a mention by ʻAbdu'l-Bahá, then head of the religion, in 1916 as Latin America being among the places Baháʼís should take the religion to. The community of the Baháʼís begins in 1942 with the arrival of Dr. Malcolm King. The first Baháʼí Local Spiritual Assembly of Jamaica, in Kingston, was elected in 1943. By 1957 the Baháʼís of Jamaica were organized under the regional National Spiritual Assembly of the Greater Antilles, and on the eve of national independence in 1962, the Jamaica Baháʼís elected their own National Spiritual Assembly in 1961. By 1981 hundreds of Baháʼís and hundreds more non-Baháʼís turned out for weekend meetings when Rúhíyyih Khánum spent six days in Jamaica. Public recognition of the religion came in the form of the Governor General of Jamaica, Sir Howard Cooke, proclaiming a National Baháʼí Day first on July 25 in 2003 and it has been an annual event since. While there is evidence of several active communities by 2008 in Jamaica, estimates of the Baháʼís population range from the hundreds to the thousands.

== Early phase ==
ʻAbdu'l-Bahá, the son of the founder of the religion, wrote a series of letters, or tablets, to the followers of the religion in the United States in 1916–1917; these letters were compiled together in the book titled Tablets of the Divine Plan. The sixth of the tablets was the first to mention Latin American regions and was written on April 8, 1916, but was delayed in being presented in the United States until 1919—after the end of the First World War and the Spanish flu. The first actions on the part of the Baháʼí community towards Latin America were that of a few individuals who made trips to Mexico and South America near or before this unveiling in 1919, including Mr. and Mrs. Frankland, Roy C. Wilhelm, and Martha Root. The sixth tablet was translated and presented by Mirza Ahmad Sohrab on April 4, 1919, and published in Star of the West magazine on December 12, 1919.

His Christ Holiness says: Travel ye to the East and to the West of the world and summon the people to the Kingdom of God....(travel to) the Islands of the West Indies, such as Cuba, Haiti, Puerto Rico, Jamaica, the Islands of the Lesser Antilles, Bahama Islands, even the small Watling Island, have great importance...

=== Seven Year Plan and succeeding decades ===
Shoghi Effendi wrote a cable on May 1, 1936, to the Baháʼí Annual Convention of the United States and Canada, and asked for the systematic implementation of ʻAbdu'l-Bahá's vision to begin. In his cable he wrote:

Appeal to assembled delegates ponder historic appeal voiced by ʻAbdu'l-Bahá in Tablets of the Divine Plan. Urge earnest deliberation with the incoming National Assembly to ensure its complete fulfillment. The first century of the Baháʼí Era is drawing to a close. Humanity entering outer fringes most perilous stage its existence. Opportunities of present hour unimaginably precious. Would to God every State within American Republic and every Republic in American continent might ere termination of this glorious century embrace the light of the Faith of Baháʼu'lláh and establish structural basis of His World Order.

Following the May 1 cable, another cable from Shoghi Effendi came on May 19 calling for permanent pioneers to be established in all the countries of Latin America. The Baháʼí National Spiritual Assembly of the United States and Canada appointed the Inter-America Committee to take charge of the preparations. During the 1937 Baháʼí North American Convention, Shoghi Effendi cabled advising the convention to prolong their deliberations to permit the delegates and the National Assembly to consult on a plan that would enable Baháʼís to go to Latin America as well as to include the completion of the outer structure of the Baháʼí House of Worship in Wilmette, Illinois. In 1937 the First Seven Year Plan (1937–44), which was an international plan designed by Shoghi Effendi, gave the American Baháʼís the goal of establishing the Baháʼí Faith in every country in Latin America. With the spread of American Baháʼís in Latin American, Baháʼí communities and Local Spiritual Assemblies began to form in 1938 across the rest of Latin America.

=== Establishment ===
After a brief visit in 1939 by John and Rosa Shaw from San Francisco, the community of the Baháʼí Faith in Jamaica began in 1942 with the arrival of Dr. Malcolm King—from Portland, Oregon, United States and of Jamaican background. King taught the religion to Marion Maxwell, the first Jamaican Baháʼí and William Mitchell (previously accountant for the Universal Negro Improvement Association and African Communities League (UNIA) founded by Marcus Garvey). The first Baháʼí Local Spiritual Assembly of Jamaica, in Kingston, was elected in 1943. Mitchell was the Jamaican delegate to the Baháʼí All-America Convention called for by Shoghi Effendi, then head of the religion, to be held in the United States May 17–24, 1944, on the centenary of the declaration of the Báb. Mitchell in turn taught the religion to Julius Edwards, associated with Garvey and later pioneered to the area now called Ghana in 1953 and later in Liberia. There was also Eustace Whyte among the early Baháʼís of Jamaica who served as president of UNIA's Harmony Division in Kingston as well as elected to the Local Spiritual Assembly of Kingston. Garvey scholar Robert Hill gave a eulogy at one of Whyte's funeral services.

== Growth ==
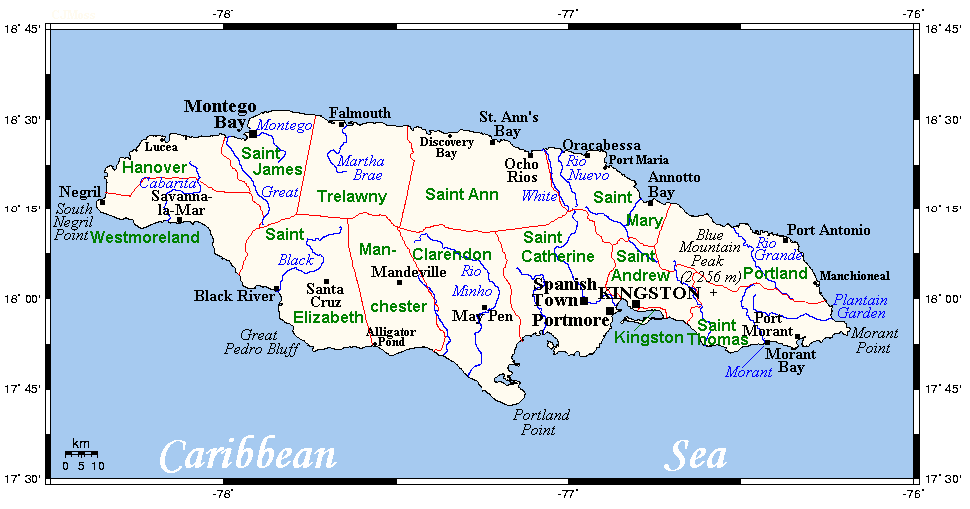
Jamaica parishes and towns

From the early period of development the Baháʼí community in Jamaica grew in organization and relationship with the wider community while growing internally as well. Before national independence, the Jamaicans were part of a regional National Spiritual Assembly of the Greater Antilles from 1957 through 1961 and on the eve of national independence in 1962, the Jamaica Baháʼís elected their own National Spiritual Assembly in 1961 with Hand of the Cause Enoch Olinga representing the Baháʼí International Community. In 1963 there were Baháʼí Local Spiritual Assemblies in six cities: Annatto Bay, Kingston, May Pen, Port Antonio, Spanish Town, and Yallahs and smaller groups of Baháʼís in Bartons (St. Catherine), Crooked River, Montego Bay, and Porus.

In 1963 the Baháʼís of the world looked to the election of the Universal House of Justice as the new head of the religion. The electors were the members of the national assemblies then in existence. The members of the Jamaican National Assembly who participated in the election were Miss Doris Maud Buchanan, Mr. Randolph Fitz-Henley, Miss Alice Maude Gallier, Mr. Wm. Arthur Wellesley Mitchell, Mr. Alfred Senior, Miss Emily Taylor, Miss Ruby Taylor, Mr. Clarence Ullrich, Mrs. Margarite Ullrich. Later the Universal House of Justice called for eight Oceanic and Continental Conferences and one was held in Kingston for the Caribbean region in May 1971. In 1981, just before the 40th anniversary of the founding of the Baháʼí community in Jamaica, Hand of the Cause Rúhíyyih Khánum traveled throughout the Caribbean region and spent six days in Jamaica. She was received by the Governor General and Prime Minister while over two hundred Baháʼís attended a weekend conference and more non-Baháʼís attended a public meeting. A twenty-minute television interview as well as general coverage by radio and television reporters highlighted her visit.

Since its inception the religion has had involvement in socio-economic development beginning by giving greater freedom to women, promulgating the promotion of female education as a priority concern, and that involvement was given practical expression by creating schools, agricultural coops, and clinics. The religion entered a new phase of activity when a message of the Universal House of Justice dated 20 October 1983 was released. Baháʼís were urged to seek out ways, compatible with the Baháʼí teachings, in which they could become involved in the social and economic development of the communities in which they lived. Worldwide in 1979 there were 129 officially recognized Baháʼí socio-economic development projects. By 1987, the number of officially recognized development projects had increased to 1482. In 1985 the Baháʼí International Community canvassed the National Assemblies with a questionnaire—77 of the 143 then existing assemblies responded. Jamaican responses highlighted a sense that women in Jamaica were taking on leadership positions in local assemblies. Former assistant to the dean of the school of engineering and applied science at Washington University in St. Louis, Naomi McCord, and her husband served as caretakers of the National Baháʼí Center in Kingston for a number of years. McCord willed more than 200 volumes from her personal library to the center.

In a first step in relation to the general Jamaican community, the National Spiritual Assembly of the Baháʼís of Jamaica was a founding member of the Jamaican Interfaith Council in 1992.

== Modern community ==
The Baháʼís have participated in a number of activities of wider and local relevance to Jamaicans. In 2000 Baháʼís joined in observing the International Day of Peace with prayers called for by the Millennium World Peace Summit of religious leaders which met at the United Nations during August 28–31, and in 2002 Baháʼís participated in a national dialogue on transcending tribalistic boundaries present in politics. Governor General of Jamaica, Sir Howard Cooke, proclaimed a National Baháʼí Day first on July 25 in 2003 and it has been an annual event since. Among the celebrations of the 60th anniversary of the first Jamaican local spiritual assembly after two weeks of events was a blood drive organized by the Baháʼís of Kingston. The festivities were also attended by retired Continental Counselor Ruth Pringle just two weeks before her death. In 2006 the Baháʼís of Port Antonio held a 4-day exhibition at the public library on the history of the Faith in Jamaica with the Baháʼí Day observance. The Baháʼí Centre in Kingston has hosted Sir Howard Cooke's Thursday Group which has continued to operate since Sir Cooke's retirement in 2006. In 2008 Baháʼí Dorothy Whyte was named the new executive director at the Women's Resource and Outreach Centre in Kingston. In 2005 the international Baháʼí choir, Voices of Bahá, performed in Jamaica as part of their first tour in the Caribbean and performed at Ward Theatre and the University's Chapel with proceeds earmarked to two Jamaican charities serving families of policemen slain in the line of duty and the Denham Town Golden Age Home.

=== Demographics ===
In 2000 local sources reported 4,000 Baháʼís in Jamaica, notably in cities like Montego Bay, Port Antonio, Ocho Rios and May Pen though recent international sources reported anywhere from 279 Baháʼís to more than 8,000. The Association of Religion Data Archives (relying on World Christian Encyclopedia) estimated some 5137 Baháʼís in 2005. In 2006 there were 21 local spiritual assemblies. In 2008, Baháʼí community events are listed especially in Montego Bay, Morant Bay, Port Morant, and the Kingston/St. Andrew Parish area.

== Further study ==
- Have You Heard the News (film). South Carolina and Jamaica: Kiva Films, Inc for the National Spiritual Assembly of the Baháʼís of the United States. 1972.

== See also ==
- Baháʼí Faith by country
- Culture of Jamaica
- History of Jamaica
