= Leonora Armstrong =

First Bahá'í to live in Brazil

- Born: Leonora Stirling Holsapple; June 23, 1895; Hudson, New York, United States
- Died: October 17, 1980 (aged 85); Salvador
- Known for: Baháʼí Faith in Brazil

Leonora Stirling Holsapple Armstrong (June 23, 1895 – October 17, 1980) was the first person of the Baháʼí faith to live in Brazil. She went as a Baháʼí pioneer to Brazil in 1921 when she was 25 years old. Later, in recognition of her efforts and services for the Baháʼí Faith in Brazil and across Latin America she was named the 'Spiritual Mother of the Baháʼís of South America'.

== Early life ==
Leonora Stirling Holsapple was born on June 23, 1895, in the City of Hudson, New York. Her father was businessman Samuel Norris Holsapple and her mother was Grace Heathcote Stirling, who served actively in civic work and had taught school. However, Grace had serious health problems [what would later be known as diabetes], and died soon after Leonora turned five years old. This created a profound effect upon Leonora and her younger sister Alethe during their childhood and adolescence. Their father was devastated at the loss and often left the two little girls in the care of their grandmothers and a housekeeper.

Leonora was a very talented child. She read the entire Bible as a child, a secret she only disclosed later in life, and was high school valedictorian. She entered Cornell University in Ithaca, New York, on a full four-year scholarship and was elected to Phi Beta Kappa in her junior year. Leonora graduated with a Bachelor of Arts degree from Cornell, where she had studied Latin, Greek, Physics, Botany, Astronomy and Chemistry. After that, she taught Latin in high schools for two years in Boston and was active in social work, just as her mother and grandmother had been before her.

=== Introduction to the Baháʼí Faith ===
When Leonora was about eleven years old, her maternal grandmother found the Baháʼí Faith after years of searching and declared herself a Baháʼí [circa 1906]. She began to instruct her granddaughters in the Baháʼí Faith, teaching them to sing Baháʼí "hymns" and read and memorize passages and prayers from Hidden Words and the Baháʼí Writings. Later, Leonora would share the Baháʼí teachings with her classmates and friends.

=== Interest in Pioneering ===
The desire to pioneer first came in Leonora's mind when ʻAbdu'l-Bahá's Tablets of the Divine Plan were unveiled at the Baháʼí Convention held in New York City in April 1919. She immediately wrote to ʻAbdu'l-Bahá, offering herself in service and His reply to her was:

Thou hadst expressed thy great wish to be of service to the Divine Threshold and to heal the infirm with the Divine Panacea--the infirm who is afflicted with passion and self. Spiritual malady is more severe than physical illness for it may be that the latter may be converted by the least remedy into health and vigor, while the former will not be cured by a thousand well-known remedies ... My hope is that thou mayest become a spiritual physician.

Leonora was touched by the message from ʻAbdu'l-Bahá. She was also influenced by Martha Root, a well-known Baháʼí who traveled widely, who was instrumental in Leonora's eventual immigration to South America. Leonora later said:

This hope of the Master's became my highest aspiration and when, early in 1920, I read His Tablet to Martha Root, commending her teaching work in South America and stressing the importance of its being followed up by others, it at once seemed to me that here there might be a definite task for me. A letter to Martha brought an immediate reply, with all encouragement.

Martha Root, who had visited South America in 1919, sent Leonora a copy of her own diary notes from that period. Although Martha had suggested Argentina as a destination, she later encouraged her to go to Brazil.

=== Arrival in Brazil ===
Many of Leonora's family members and friends were concerned about her decision to travel alone to far-away Brazil without knowing Portuguese or having any contacts there. However, on February 1, 1921, she arrived in the port of Rio de Janeiro. The fact that she was a single woman, at a time when women had less rights and freedom, made her situation difficult, but she managed to stay in the country. Leonora got her first job in an office through a young theosophist in the city of Santos, São Paulo. Later, she started to give private English classes, which gave her a chance to teach the Baháʼí Faith. When she could, Leonora would participate as a speaker in the national conferences. During her first year in Rio de Janeiro, she participated in the National Congress of Esperanto.

== Service ==
In 1925 in the city of Belém, Pará she published her first translation (English to Portuguese) of the book Paris Talks written by ʻAbdu'l-Bahá. As well as being a lecturer, educator and translator, Leonora was also a social worker and was responsible for an orphanage in Salvador, Bahia in the from 1924 to 1927. During her first years in Brazil, she lived in Salvador, Bahia, and traveled several times to Belém and Manaus. She always had a lot of support from many Theosophists and Esperantists in her services. In 1927, she published many articles and pamphlets about the Baháʼí Faith in Belém. That same year, she was the first Baháʼí to talk about the Baháʼí Faith in Colombia, Venezuela, Coracion, Trinidad and Tobago, Barbados, Haiti, Guyana and Suriname.

Leonora also helped translate Baháʼí books into Spanish. She went to Madrid, Spain to improve her language proficiency because Shoghi Effendi, the great-grandson of Baháʼuʼlláh and then head of the religion, was looking for translators. In July 1930 she traveled to Madrid to take university courses. However, she soon fell seriously ill for a time and was unable to begin her studies. Shortly thereafter, she went on Baháʼí pilgrimage and then returned to South America.

=== Formation of the Baháʼí Institution in Brazil ===
In 1940 at Salvador — after 19 years of her dedicated work of education, translations and social services — Leonora was thrilled to witness the formation of the first official Baháʼí Institution in Brazil: the Local Spiritual Assembly (LSA) of the Baháʼís of Salvador. The Assembly has nine members that are elected each April for an annual term by the Baháʼí community in Ridván. She was one of the first members, together with some Brazilians who had converted to the Bahá'í faith. Later, a second LSA was formed in Rio de Janeiro and in 1946, a third one in the city of São Paulo. In 1961, the first National Spiritual Assembly of the Baháʼís of Brazil was founded. In 1973 Leonora was appointed a Continental Counsellor, the highest appointed position of service in the religion, by the Universal House of Justice, now the head of the Baháʼí Faith. The Counsellors dedicate their time fully to the Baháʼí Cause. They are an extension of the Hands of the Cause of God, appointments to service made by Baháʼuʼlláh, 'Abdu'l-Bahá and Shoghi Effendi during their lifetimes.

=== Marriage ===
In August 1941, at age 46, Leonora married an Englishman, Harold V. Armstrong, a widower whom she had known for several years. Leonora and her husband lived in many places in Brazil. Though they never had children of their own they adopted and raised about twenty over the course of the years, or provided others with financial assistance.

=== Defender of Women's Rights ===
Leonora was a notable defender of women's rights, emphasizing their role as educators and servants for the cause of world peace. Her message, recorded on a tape in Salvador, Bahia days before her death in October 1980, was addressed to hundreds of women gathered in the Centre of Conventions of Brasília, participants of the first Women's Latin-American Baháʼí Conference. Here are some excerpts from her message:

Woman, light of the future generation - When we, the women of the world, reflect on the true meaning of this subject that was chosen and to the measure that its full meaning penetrate deeply each time in the conscience of each woman, we should understand how loving, what a supreme privilege is ours and inescapable duty we have, and that we should rise like never before, to fulfill our first obligation. The women know that they are the first educators of the humanity ...

== Last Years ==
Leonora spent her last years in Minas Gerais, in the city of Juiz de Fora, and died on October 17, 1980, at the age of 85 in the city of Salvador. That same day, hundreds of Baháʼís from several communities of Latin America were gathered in Brasília, participating in the first Women's Latin-American Baháʼí Conference. The climax of this meeting for promotion of the condition of women was the moment her words of greeting to the participants of the event were played for the assembly.

== See also ==
- Baháʼí Faith in Brazil
- Baháʼí Faith in South America
