= Siron Franco =

Brazilian painter (born 1947)

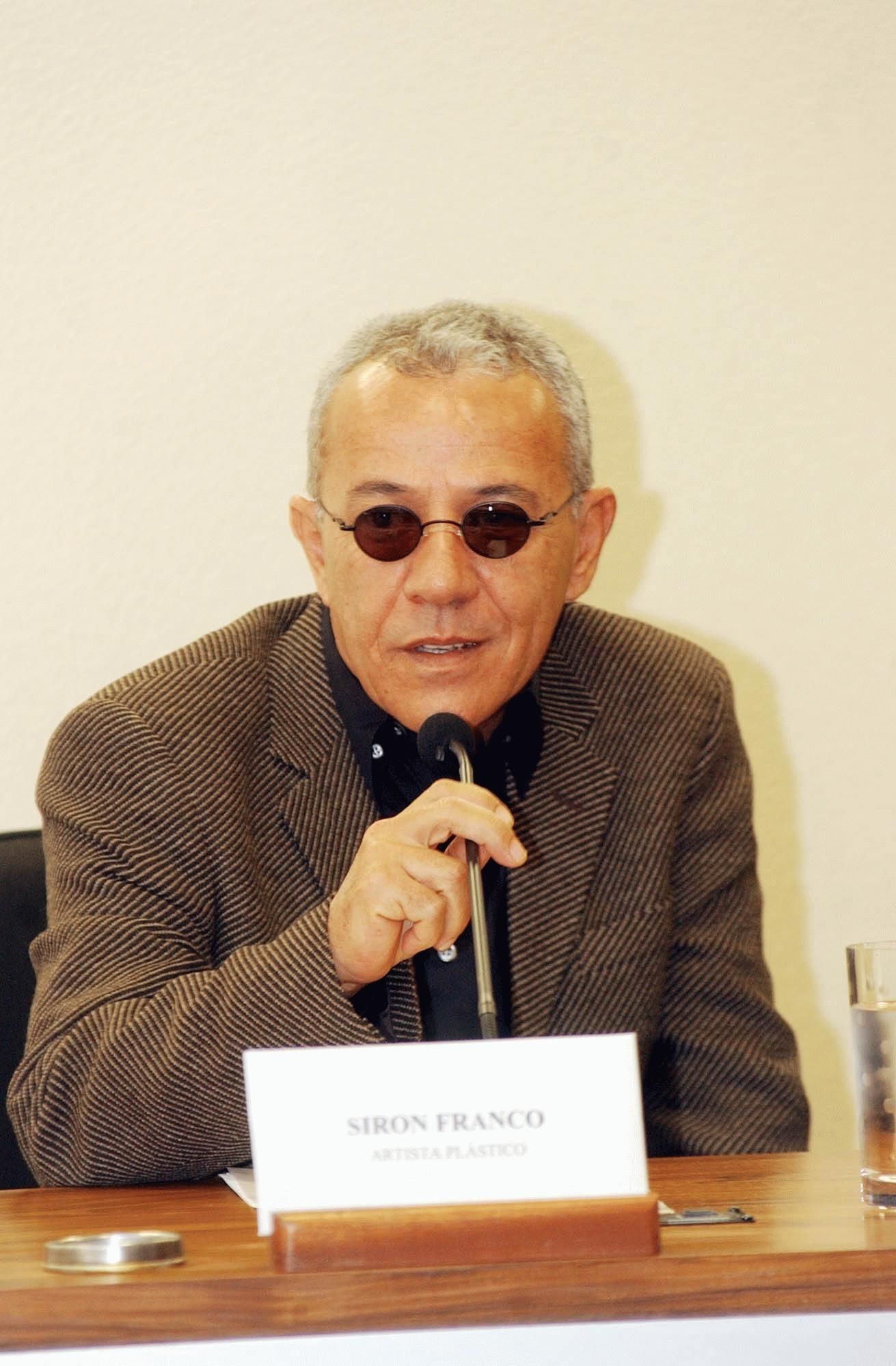
- Speaking to a Commission of the Brazilian Senate
- Born: Gessiron Alves de Franco; July 26, 1947 (age 78); Goiás, Goiás
- Known for: Painter, Sculptor
- Movement: Modernism
- Awards: 1968 - Biennal of Bahia; 1973 - Salao Global da Primavera; 1974 - National Prize of São Paulo's Biennal; 1975 - International Prize of Sao Paulo's Biennal; 1982 - Best Exhibition in Brazil; 1982 - Best Brazilian Painter

Gessiron Alves de Franco, known as Siron Franco (born July 26, 1947), is a Brazilian painter and sculptor. Siron Franco was born in Goiás Velho on July 26, 1947. Siron Franco spent his childhood and adolescence in Goiânia, taking his first painting lessons under the guidance of the artists DJ Oliveira and Cleber Gouveia. He started making a living at the age of 13, painting and selling portraits of the cities' bourgeoise. In 1965, he focused on drawings, following the unreal and grotesque sketches he had in mind. In 1968 he won the National Biennal of Bahia. Between 1969 and 1971, Siron lived in São Paulo, frequented the studios of Bernardo Cid and Walter Lewy in São Paulo and was one of the members of the group that participated in the exhibition Surrealism and Fantastic Art at Seta Gallery. In 1973, Siron Franco won the prestigious Salao Global da Primavera in Rio de Janeiro. Afterwards he spent a year living in Mexico City. After winning the International prize of São Paulo's Biennal Exhibition in 1975, Siron toured Europe between 1976 and 1978 living mainly in Toledo and Madrid in Spain. In 1982, his Exhibition at Bonino Gallery was considered the best of the year in Brazil and Siron received the distinguished title of the best Brazilian Painter of 1982 by APCA, São Paulo's Painters & Critics Association.

Owner of an impeccable technique, Siron gives a dramatic atmosphere to his paintings using dark, gray and brown tones. With more than 30,000 pieces created, as well as, facilities and urban interferences around the world, his work was presented in more than one hundred conferences around the world, including the most important exhibitions and biennials. In 2012 Siron Franco's installations at Rio +20 took the visitors breath away. The focus was on the damage caused by criminal fire on the Brazilian Savannah known in Portuguese as Cerrado which is the native biome of Siron's native State of Goias in the heart of Brazil's territory.

In 1992 Siron Franco, who first declared his belief in Baháʼu'lláh during a live radio interview broadcast throughout Brazil, designed the Peace Monument for the Earth Summit and has continued to work in painting, ceramics, sculpture.

== See also ==
- Baháʼí Faith in Brazil
