= Association of Religion Data Archives =

Free online information source

The Association of Religion Data Archives (ARDA) is a free source of online information related to American and international religion. One of the primary goals of the archive is to democratize access to academic information on religion by making this information as widely accessible as possible. More than 1,000 surveys, membership reports, and other data collections are available for online preview, and can all be downloaded free of charge. Other features include national profiles, GIS maps, church membership overviews, denominational heritage trees, historical timelines, tables, charts, and other summary reports.

Founded as the American Religion Data Archive in 1997, and online since 1998, the archive was initially targeted at researchers interested in American religion. In February 2006, the American Religion Data Archive became the Association of Religion Data Archives when an international data archive was added. The archive includes both American and international collections as well as features for educators, journalists, religious congregations, and researchers.

Data included in the ARDA are submitted by religion scholars and research centers worldwide. Housed in the Center for the Study of Religion and American Culture at Indiana University Indianapolis, the ARDA is funded by Lilly Endowment, the John Templeton Foundation, Chapman University, and Indiana University Indianapolis.

== History ==
Roger Finke, then professor of sociology at Purdue University, received a grant from Lilly Endowment to create the American Religion Data Archive in 1996. Data file collection and processing began in 1997. The online archive launched in the fall of 1998 under the domain name www.thearda.com, and originally contained thirty-three surveys regarding American religion. Within ten years, the archive had expanded to include more than 400 data files. As of 2026, more than 1,000 data files were available for free download on the ARDA website.

Starting in 2005, the ARDA began to host surveys dealing with religion outside the United States. In 2006, the archive therefore changed its name from the American Religion Data Archive to the Association of Religion Data Archives to more properly reflect the scope of information available. The new name preserved both the acronym and the domain name from the American Religion Data Archive.

Since its founding, the ARDA has moved from Purdue to the Population Research Institute at Pennsylvania State University to the Center for the Study of Religion and American Culture at Indiana University Indianapolis. The ARDA is directed by Andrew Whitehead of Indiana University Indianapolis and Christopher Bader of Chapman University.

== Overview ==
The primary component of the ARDA, the data archive, contains over 1,000 quantitative data files as of January 2026. ARDA staff do not themselves collect the data encompassed in these files; rather, the surveys' principal investigators submit their data to the ARDA for processing and archiving. Thus, the data files included in the archive originate from almost 200 different sources. Data from the General Social Survey, the American National Election Studies, the World Religion Database, the Public Religion Research Institute, and the Pew Research Center are also available. Among the most common topics of information included are public opinions regarding social issues (e.g. abortion, homosexuality, the role of women in ministry), survey respondents' perceptions of God/the divine, and survey respondents' religious affiliations.

In addition to archived survey data, the ARDA also provides information regarding the religious composition of, and the state of religious freedom in, the 232 nations recognized by the United States State Department; membership and distributional data and historical lineages ("family trees") of major world religions and U.S. denominations thereof; and various learning tools.

A bi-weekly column written by Ryan Burge, Ahead of the Trend, offers the latest data interpretations and visualizations from free religion data sources available on the ARDA website. This column was originated by David Briggs, a former national writer for the Associated Press.

In 2015, the ARDA began providing interactive historical timelines of religion in the United States. There are nine interactive timelines listed: Prominent Religious Events and People, Social Movements and Religion, Religious Minorities, Race/Ethnicity and Religion, Women and Religion, Baptist Events and People, Catholic Events and People, Methodist Events and People, and Presbyterian Events and People.

== Affiliations ==
The ARDA is both affiliated with and funded by the following organizations:

- Lilly Endowment
- The John Templeton Foundation
- Templeton Religion Trust
- Indiana University Indianapolis
- Chapman University

== Awards and recognition ==
- The ARDA was one of thirty online resources selected by the Reference and User Services Association (RUSA) division of the American Library Association for the 2010 Best Free Reference Websites List.
- The Lilly Endowment's "Insights into Religion" portal lists the ARDA as one of the best online resources for continuing education about religion, demographic research, youth research, and teaching religion.

== See also ==
- Religion and the internet
