= Martha Root =

Traveling Baháʼí teacher (1872–1939)

Martha Louise Root

Martha Louise Root (August 10, 1872 – September 28, 1939) was an American traveling teacher of the Baháʼí Faith in the early 20th century. From the declaration of her belief in 1909 until her death thirty years later, she went around the world four times. Shoghi Effendi, then head of the Baháʼí Faith, called her "the foremost travel teacher in the first Baháʼí Century", and named her a Hand of the Cause posthumously. Known for her numerous visits with heads of state and other public figures, of special importance was her interaction with Queen Marie of Romania, considered the first royal to accept Baháʼu'lláh.

== Early life ==
Martha Root was born on August 10, 1872, to Timothy and Nancy Root in Richwood, Ohio, who raised her in the Baptist church. She had two older brothers, Clarence and Claude. Shortly after her birth, the family moved to Cambridge Springs, Pennsylvania, where her father ran a dairy farm. Martha, known as Mattie, was not a typical girl, since her interest lay in books rather than the usual domestic pursuits, and when she was 14 she earned enough money from writing to pay for a trip to Niagara Falls. She distinguished herself in high school and college, attending Oberlin College, where she designed her own program; she then continued to the University of Chicago and earned her degree in literature in 1895.

=== Writing career ===
While she started teaching after her degree, she soon gave that up to start writing for different newspapers. In the summer of 1900, she worked at the Pittsburgh Chronicle Telegraph as the society editor, and then in the fall, she worked for the Pittsburgh Dispatch. She then started writing about automobiles, which took her to France and then back to Pittsburgh.

=== Introduction to the Baháʼí Faith ===
In 1908, she overheard Roy C. Wilhelm in a Pittsburgh restaurant talking about his visit to ʻAbdu'l-Bahá and Bahaʼis in ʻAkka in the Holy Land, and how he had met members of other religions who actively promoted the brotherhood of humanity. This comment appealed to Martha, and she questioned Roy, who gave her some Baha'i literature. While researching the religion, she met several members of the Baháʼí community, including Thornton Chase and Arthur Agnew in Chicago, and in 1909, she declared her faith in Baháʼu'lláh's teachings. During this time, she continued writing newspaper articles, and also in 1909, she wrote a detailed article for the Pittsburgh Post about the history and teachings of the Baháʼí Faith. She also participated in the first annual Baháʼí convention, which took place in Chicago in 1911.

=== Visit of ʻAbdu'l-Bahá to the United States ===
During 1912, from April through December, ʻAbdu'l-Bahá, the son of the founder of the Baháʼí Faith, visited the United States and Canada. Martha attended many of ʻAbdu'l-Bahá's talks, and arranged his talk in Pittsburgh. During this time, Martha developed breast cancer, but with advice from ʻAbdu'l-Baha it went into remission for many years.

=== World travel and teaching ===
After meeting with ʻAbdu'l-Bahá, Martha was profoundly affected by His explanations of His Father's cause and teachings, and began her journeys where she would spread the teachings of the Baháʼí Faith. She did not let her small stature, lack of money, or poor health stop her. She left the United States on January 30, 1915, and after visiting some countries in Europe, she desired to visit Palestine and the Baháʼí holy places, but she could not go due to the First World War. Instead, she traveled to Egypt and stayed there for six months. During that time, she wrote newspaper articles. She then traveled to Bombay, Rangoon, Japan, and Hawaii. She arrived back in the continental United States when she reached San Francisco on August 29, 1915.

After staying in the United States for five years, she then traveled to Canada in 1920, visiting Saint John, Montreal, London, and Saint Thomas, where she arranged teaching programs. She then travelled to Mexico and then Guatemala where she was going to meet with the president, but due to a political revolution, the meeting never happened. By 1921, her breast cancer had spread, and she was in frequent pain; her father's health was also failing, making her travels more limited.

In 1921, she became the first female faculty member at Polish National Alliance College in Cambridge Springs, Pa.

== Middle years ==
After her father's death on November 3, 1922, Martha started her travels once again at the age of 50. She traveled to many parts of the United States, Canada, Japan, and China to spread the teachings of Baháʼu'lláh, and the Baháʼí Faith. She then travelled to Australia, New Zealand, Tasmania, and Hong Kong, and helped Baháʼí pioneers teach about the Baháʼí Faith. She then traveled to South Africa, and went on several radio broadcasts. She also studied Esperanto, and met Lidia Zamenhof, the daughter of Ludwig Zamenhof, the creator of Esperanto, who would later become a Baháʼí.

=== Martha Root and Queen Marie of Romania ===
In January 1926, Martha arrived in Bucharest, where, being advised that she would be unable to meet Queen Marie, she sent her a picture of ʻAbdu'l-Bahá and a copy of the book, Baháʼu’lláh and the New Era. Having read until 3 a.m, Marie sent Martha an invitation to an audience at Controceni Palace, and following an initial greeting, Marie’s first words were, "I believe these Teachings are the solution for the world’s problems today!"

As a result of her contact with Martha, Marie published an article supporting the Bahá’í Faith for Hearst and the North American Newspaper Alliance, for which she had started writing her own columns; and on May 4, she published an open letter in the Toronto Star, full of praise for the Bahá’í Faith and beginning by referring to Martha, "A woman brought me the other day a Book. I spell it with a capital letter because it is a glorious Book of love and goodness, strength and beauty. It teaches that all hatreds, intrigues, suspicions, even words, all aggressive patriotism even, are outside the one essential law of God, and that special beliefs are but surface things, whereas the heart that beats with divine love knows no tribe nor race. It is Christ’s message taken up anew, in the same words almost, but adapted to the thousand years and more difference that lies between the year one and today…. If ever the name of Bahá’u’lláh or Abdu’l-Baha comes to your attention, do not put their writings from you. Search out their Books, and let their glorious, peace-bringing, love-creating words and lessons sink into your hearts as they have into mine."

Martha met Queen Marie on seven further occasions. The second, in 1927, at Pelisor Castle in Sinaia, was followed by a visit in January 1928 at the royal palace in Belgrade. A fourth visit took place in October 1929, at the Queen's summer palace, "Tehna Yuva," at Balcic, on the Black Sea. In August 1932 and February 1933, Martha Root was received at the home of Princess Ileana (then Arch-Duchess Anton of Austria) at Mödling, near Vienna. Marie wrote of her 1933 meeting with Martha in her diary for 31 January 1933, "Eager little Martha Root of the Bahá’í came to lunch. Wonderful how that thin inconspicuous little middle-aged woman manages to spread the teaching, to publish books and get into touch with so many … to make her quiet way and in many ways to succeed. It is admirable. She is a touching person and today we had her to ourselves". Martha’s final two meetings with Queen Marie took place in February 1934 and February 1936 at Controceni Palace.

Martha described her meetings with Queen Marie in Bahá’í World Volume VI, including a statement of Marie’s which was used as the frontispiece to Bahá’í World, Volume IV, stating, "The Bahá’í Teaching brings peace and understanding. It is like a wide embrace gathering together all those who have long searched for words of hope. It accepts all great prophets gone before, it destroys no other creeds and leaves all doors open. Saddened by the continual strife amongst believers of many confessions and wearied of their intolerance towards each other, I discovered in the Bahá’í Teaching the real spirit of Christ so often denied and misunderstood. Unity instead of strife, Hope instead of condemnation, Love instead of hate, and a great reassurance for all men."

=== Visit to the Holy Land ===
In 1925, Martha Root travelled to the Baháʼí holy land, and met Bahíyyih Khánum and Shoghi Effendi. She then traveled to the United Kingdom, Germany, Greece, Yugoslavia and Czechoslovakia, once again teaching the Baháʼí Faith. She then traveled to Iran, even though Shoghi Effendi recommended not doing so. She hoped to meet with the Sháh, Reza Khan Pahlavi, but did not do so.

== Later years ==
In 1930, she wanted to meet with Emperor Hirohito of Japan, but US officials blocked her access. Instead, she sent the Emperor some Baháʼí books and some other gifts. She continued to teach, even while she was in ill-health, travelling in 1937 to Hawaii, China and India. She returned to Hawaii in 1938 where she died on September 28, 1939.

== Publications ==
- Root, Martha (1981). Táhirih the Pure. Los Angeles, USA: Kalimát Press. ISBN 1-890688-04-5.
- Jiling Yang (Jan 12, 2007). In Search of Martha Root: An American Baha'i Feminist and Peace Advocate in the Early Twentieth Century (Thesis). Institute for Women's, Gender, and Sexuality Studies, Georgia State University.

== See also ==
- List of peace activists
