= Baháʼí teaching plans =

Series of multi-year plans to organize Baháʼí teaching efforts

In order to reinforce the overall global vision of the Baháʼí Faith a systematic sequence of plans was established by Shoghi Effendi, beginning with two local plans involving the North American Baháʼís between 1926 and 1933, and expanding to national plans from 1937 onwards. These national plans culminated with the global Ten Year Crusade from 1953 to 1963, and following the establishment of the Universal House of Justice in 1963, the pattern of regular plans continued. With time frames lasting between one and ten years, the plans aim to equip the Baháʼí community in bringing about the betterment of humanity through the promotion of individual spiritual development and social and individual transformation.

== Background ==
Written during 1916 and 1917, and announced during a ceremony in New York in April 1919, ʻAbdu'l-Bahá's fourteen letters known as the Tablets of the Divine Plan were addressed to the Baháʼís of North America and Canada, instructing them to teach the Faith systematically in areas where there were few believers, to establish it in Latin America, and to spread it across the world. These letters were addressed to Baháʼís in specific areas: eight to the Baháʼís in the Northeastern, Southern, Central, and Western states, two to the Baháʼís of Canada, and four jointly to the Baháʼís of Canada and the United States. In addition to specific instructions regarding the different countries and regions to which Baháʼís were to travel, the letters advocate the spiritual qualities which they needed to acquire in order to teach. ʻAbdu'l-Bahá's successor, Shoghi Effendi, refers to the Tablets of the Divine Plan as ʻAbdu'l-Bahá's mandate, and the 'supreme charter for teaching'. All subsequent teaching plans designed by Shoghi Effendi and the Universal House of Justice have been based around the Tablets of the Divine Plan.

== Plans under Shoghi Effendi ==
In 1937 Shoghi Effendi launched the first of a series of national plans with a Seven-Year Plan for the Baháʼís of the United States and Canada, its specific goals being to create at least one Local Spiritual Assembly in every Canadian province and every State in the United States, the opening of every Latin American Republic through the settlement of Baháʼí pioneers, and the completion of the exterior of the Baháʼí house of worship in Wilmette, Illinois.

Two Six-Year Plans followed. The first, from 1938 - 1944, involved India and Burma, and aimed to use pioneers in order to create well-established communities and extend the Faith into small towns and cities; and the second plan, from 1944 -1950, with its focus on the United Kingdom, aimed to form 19 Local Spiritual Assemblies in the UK, Northern Ireland and Eire, to double the number of Baháʼís, and to dispatch pioneers to Scotland, Wales and Northern Ireland.

Having given the Baháʼís in North America a two-year respite following the completion of their first Seven-Year plan, Shoghi Effendi launched a second Seven-Year Plan in 1946, focused on creating National Spiritual Assemblies in South America, Central America and Canada, re-establishing the Faith in Europe following the ravages of the second world war, and completing the interior ornamentation and landscaping of the House of Worship in Illinois. At the plan’s successful conclusion in 1953 Shoghi Effendi designated it as a Holy Year, marking as it did the centenary of the start of Baháʼu'lláh’s mission.

1946 also saw the launch of a Forty-Five Month plan by the National Spiritual Assembly of Iran, leading to an increase in Baháʼí communities and to many Baháʼís moving to surrounding countries. A Four Year Plan followed from 1950, one of the objectives being the elevation of the status of women; as a result, for the first time women became eligible for election to local and national Spiritual Assemblies by the end of the plan.

In January 1946 the first of two further plans for India and Burma was implemented. Lasting four and a half years, the goals for this plan included the building of a national centre, reestablishing disbanded LSAs, the distribution of Baháʼí literature and re-establishment of committees and schools, and assistance for the poor. The second plan, beginning in September 1951 and lasting nineteen months, focused on the enhancement of Baháʼí literature in local languages, sending pioneers to Nepal, Malaysia, Singapore, Madagascar, Vietnam and Zanzibar, supporting the Baháʼí school in Panchgani, expanding the number of LSAs in India, Pakistan and Sri Lanka, and contributing to the building of the Báb’s Shrine.

In 1947 two plans were launched. The three-year plan for Iraq involved the construction of a national centre and an increase in the number of Baháʼí centres, the implementation of ten new LSAs, and support for Baháʼí communities in the south. The six-year plan overseen by the National Spiritual Assembly of Australia and New Zealand expedited Shoghi Effendi’s directive to expand the number of places in which one or more Baháʼís resided, as well as establishing 19 groups in Austalasia and two LSAs in Australia.

In 1948 three five-year plans were launched. The aims of the plan for Canada were to increase the number of Baháʼí centres to 100, to create Baháʼí groups in Newfoundland, double the number of LSAs, and secure the involvement of indigenous people in Baháʼí administration. The plan for Egypt and Sudan involved raising the number of Baháʼí centres to 33, strengthening the Baháʼí community in Ethiopia, and sending pioneers to Algeria, Tunisia and Libya. The plan for Austria and Germany aimed to establish a national centre in Frankfurt, increase the number of LSAs to 28, encourage the study of the Baháʼí writings and increase the comprehension of Baháʼí administration, and to have 9 books published by 1952.

The two-year plan for South America, 1951 to 1953, and one-year plan for Central America from 1952 to 1953 both involved the assimilation of LSAs, the enhancement of Spanish literature, and the dissimilation of the Baháʼí Faith amongst the Indian population. An additional two year plan was launched by Shoghi Effendi in 1951 in order to open up large areas of Africa to the Baháʼí Faith, the resulting collaboration between several National Spiritual Assemblies offering a foretaste of future international plans.

=== Ten Year Crusade (1953–1963) ===
All Shoghi Effend’s plans having concluded successfully by 1953, in April of that year he launched a global Ten Year Plan, or Ten Year Crusade, the purpose of which was to develop the institutions at the Baháʼí World Centre, and develop new Baháʼí communities in as many territories as possible that were mentioned in ʻAbdu’l-Bahá's Tablets of the Divine Plan. This global plan concluded in 1963, coinciding with the centenary of Baháʼu’lláh’s declaration in the Garden of Ridván.

Aims of Ten Year Crusade included the opening of 132 major territories and countries to the Baháʼí Faith, an increase in the number of national and local Spiritual Assemblies in Latin America and Europe, the expansion of Baháʼí communities already existing in 120 territories and countries, and the multiplication of the diversity of languages into which Baháʼí literature was translated. Also included was the continuing work on the House of Worship in Wilmette, Chicago, which was dedicated in May 1953; work also began on Houses of Worship in Kampala, Uganda, designated the ‘Mother Temple’ for Africa, in Sydney, Australia for the Pacific, and in Frankfurt, Germany, for Europe.

Shoghi Effendi arranged a series of International conferences in order to consult on creating a shared vision in regard to the requirements of the Faith and the action required.The first conference, for Africa, took place in Kampala, in 1953, under the overall direction of Shoghi Effendi, with the second, in New Delhi, for Asia and Australasia, and the third in Stockholm, for Europe. Hands of the Cause were in attendance at each conference, one of whom acted as Shoghi Effendi’s representative; Baháʼís and National Spiritual members from the region were also in attendance, with discussion not only on the objectives of the plan, but also focused on the encouragement and inspiration of participants and the fostering of a global Baháʼí identity.

Shoghi Effendi died unexpectedly during a visit to London in November 1957, leaving no successor. However, in his Will and Testament, ʻAbdu’l-Bahá’ had instructed the Hands of the Cause to elect nine members who were to live in Haifa and assist the Guardian in his work. Following Shoghi Effendi’s passing an election was duly arranged, with the nine elected members, known as the Custodians, taking on the leadership of the global Baháʼí community until 1963, when the Ten-Year Crusade came to an end and the Universal House of Justice was first elected. During the five-and-a-half years ‘interregnum’ period the appointed Hands of the Cause steered the Ten Year Crusade successfully through to its climax and prepared the Baháʼí world for the election of the Universal House of Justice, excluding themselves from eligibility.

Following its election, the Universal House of Justice wrote:

"The rightness of the time was further confirmed by references in Shoghi Effendi's letters to the Ten Year Crusade's being followed by other plans under the direction of the Universal House of Justice. ..."

(Messages from the Universal House of Justice, 1963-1986, p. 50)The efforts of the Ten Year Crusade were followed by large enrollments to the Baháʼí Faith in some parts of the world. For example, wide-scale growth in the religion was observed across Sub-Saharan Africa.

The title Knight of Baháʼu'lláh was given by Shoghi Effendi, Guardian of the Baháʼí Faith, to Baháʼís who arose to open new territories to the Faith during the Ten Year Crusade.

Shoghi Effendi kept a Roll of Honour of all the Knights of Baháʼu'lláh. While inaugurated during the Ten Year Crusade, local restrictions caused some of the goals to remain unfilled. The final Knight of Baháʼu'lláh arrived at Sakhalin Island in December 1990. There were 254 total Knights of Baháʼu'lláh who settled in 121 localities, they had been sent to open 131 nations and territories of which 10 had already been opened. On 28 May 1992, during the commemoration of the centenary of the ascension of Baháʼu'lláh, the Roll of Honour was deposited by Rúhíyyih Khanum at the entrance door of the Shrine of Baháʼu'lláh. See a list here.

== Plans under the Universal House of Justice ==
The House of Justice, which was elected after the conclusion of the Ten Year Crusade in 1963, has continued Shoghi Effendi's practice of drawing up international plans. Since its first election in 1963, the Universal House of Justice has overseen a series of international Baháʼí teaching plans.

Summary of plans under the Universal House of Justice
Date	Plan Name	Summary of Plan
1964-1973	Nine Year Plan	This plan aimed to further develop the World Center of the Faith and its institutions, consolidate territories already open to the Baháʼí Faith, and spread the religion's message to more people and territories around the world. This included territories from the Ten Year Crusade and all remaining independent states. The plan also sought to establish 19 new National Spiritual Assemblies in Africa, the Pacific, and Asia.
1974-1979	Five Year Plan	This plan had three main objectives: preserving and consolidating victories from previous plans, expanding the Baháʼí community, and developing the distinctive character of Baháʼí life, particularly in local communities. The plan also aimed to establish 16 new National Spiritual Assemblies.
1979-1986	Seven Year Plan	The Seven Year Plan sought to continue expanding the religion, consolidate earlier victories, and achieve any remaining goals from the Five Year Plan.
1986-1992	Six Year Plan	This plan aimed to expand the religion's resources, increase its global status, and encourage the production and distribution of Baháʼí literature. It also focused on strengthening Baháʼí communities and families, increasing involvement in global needs, and pursuing social and economic development in established Baháʼí communities.
1993-1996	Three Year Plan	This plan focused on enhancing individual Baháʼís' faith, developing the human resources of the religion, and fostering the function of local and national Baháʼí institutions.
1996-2000	Four Year Plan	This plan's primary aim was to make a significant advance in the process of entry by troops.
2000-2001	Twelve Month Plan	Building on the previous Four Year Plan, this plan emphasized creating training institutes and increasing focus on the spiritual education of children and the involvement of junior youth in the Baháʼí community.
2001-2006	Five Year Plan	This plan aimed to achieve a significant advance in the process of entry by troops, marking the first in a series of plans towards this goal.
2006-2011	Five Year Plan	This plan continued the work of advancing the process of entry by troops.
2011-2016	Five Year Plan	This plan focused on extending the methods used for teaching endeavors to other areas of activity, using instruments and methods for teaching with a greater degree of coherence, and increasing the number of people actively working in the Baháʼí Faith.
2016-2021	Five Year Plan	This plan aimed to extend the process of growth to thousands of new clusters.
2021-2022	One Year Plan	This plan was designed to prepare for the Nine Year Plan.
2022-2031	Nine Year Plan	The Nine Year Plan focuses on establishing intensive programs of growth in all the clusters in the world, with the goal of releasing the societal power of the Baháʼí Faith.

== Baháʼí terminology ==
=== Teaching ===
Baháʼu'lláh stated that, although teaching the Cause of God is the greatest service anyone can offer, it should be done in a way which avoids proselytising, which is strictly forbidden. Baháʼí teaching methods have evolved over the decades, the emphasis always being on a loving, patient, respectful and humble attitude. Teaching methods vary widely, ranging from academic treatises and commentaries, the distribution of pamphlets, the publication of Baháʼí literature, including compilations of the writings of Baháʼu’lláh, through publishing trusts, exhibitions, social media, and summer schools. The “fireside”, a term originally coined by Baháʼís in Montreal, Canada, has also been used extensively in the worldwide Baháʼí community, comprising meetings open to friends and acquaintances which are held in private homes.

Current teaching is focused in particular on enabling adolescent youth to realise their intellectual and spiritual potential, using a structured method by which they become empowered to become catalysts for positive change in their communities. This long-term plan which is based on a system of action, reflection on action, and consultation on the next steps, is now being followed by a growing number of participants worldwide. A crucial element which enabled this culture of learning took place in 1996, when the Universal House of Justice asked Baháʼís in every country to establish training institutes in order to give rise to human resources and capacities for increasing the already existing development and expansion of their communities. Relative to their evolving capacities, each training institute began advancing and learning from the global development of structured learning, which has been growing steadily ever since.The evolving educational program in which the training institutes are involved, along with guidance from the Universal House of Justice and other institutions, offers the means by which universal models of learning are transmitted throughout the world to successive generations; the participants then add their own contributions to the worldwide knowledge base, at the same time increasing the knowledge base in their own localities according to their specific regional circumstances. By drawing from and contributing to a world-wide system of structured learning relative to its evolving capabilities, each training institute began what has become a continuing process of advancement.

=== Pioneering ===
The term pioneer is used among Baháʼís to describe someone who moves to a new area or country for the purpose of teaching the Baháʼí Faith. The first pioneer to enter a country or region mentioned in ʻAbdu'l-Bahá's Tablets of the Divine Plan is given the title of Knight of Baháʼu'lláh.

The following is a letter written on behalf of Shoghi Effendi to an individual regarding the term missionary:

"He sees no objection to the word Missionary appearing on your passport as long as it is clearly understood what kind of a 'missionary' a Baháʼí pioneer is. In the best and highest sense of the term it certainly could be applied to our teachers. Unfortunately this word has often been associated with a narrow-minded, bigoted type of proselytizing quite alien to the Baháʼí method of spreading our teachings."

Baháʼís do not consider pioneering to be proselytism, a term which often implies the use of coercion to convert someone to a different religion. However, sociologist Margit Warburg writes that Baháʼí pioneering is a form of organized proselytism similar to systems of organized proselytism in other religions.

=== Declaration ===
Declaration is a term used in the Baháʼí Faith to describe an adult's conversion as a member of the religion. Warburg described the declaration process as "the Baháʼí profession of faith, ritualised in the form of an administrative act."

In 1925, in a letter addressed to the National Spiritual Assemblies in the United States and Canada, Shoghi Effendi noted that defining the qualifications of a "true believer" was a nuanced and intricate matter. However, he outlined what he considered to be the essential elements of membership in the Baháʼí community. These included complete acknowledgment of the roles of the Báb, Bahá'u'lláh, and 'Abdu'l-Bahá; wholehearted acceptance of their writings; loyal and consistent commitment to Will and Testament of ʻAbdu'l-Bahá; and active engagement with both the spirit and structure of the contemporary Baháʼí administration. As World War II approached and Shoghi Effendi emphasized that Bahá'ís should seek non-combatant status if drafted, it became essential to provide a registration certificate for those wishing to join the Bahá'í Faith. In fact, many long-time believers were also asked to sign this card, often mistakenly indicating when they officially became Bahá'ís. With the introduction of these new, more formal requirements, it became common for individuals who had previously had a casual association with the Bahá'í community to completely abandon their affiliation.

=== Entry by troops ===
Entry by troops is a term used in the Baháʼí Faith to describe a process of expansion when the religion would emerge from relative obscurity as a "steady flow of reinforcements" of "troops of peoples of diverse nations and races" would embrace it. It first appeared in Baháʼu'lláh's Súriy-i-Haykal.

Entry by troops is seen as a process, not a singular event. It is seen as foreshadowing of a large-scale embracing of the Baha'i Faith, when a majority of the world will recognize and accept the teachings of Baha'u'llah. As Shoghi Effendi wrote,

"This flow, moreover, will presage and hasten the advent of the day which, as prophesied by ʻAbdu'l-Bahá, will witness the entry by troops of peoples of divers nations and races into the Baháʼí world — a day which, viewed in its proper perspective, will be the prelude to that long-awaited hour when a mass conversion on the part of these same nations and races, and as a direct result of a chain of events, momentous and possibly catastrophic in nature and which cannot as yet be even dimly visualized, will suddenly revolutionize the fortunes of the Faith, derange the equilibrium of the world, and reinforce a thousandfold the numerical strength as well as the material power and the spiritual authority of the Faith of Baháʼu'lláh."

(1953, Shoghi Effendi, "Citadel of Faith: Messages to America 1947-1957", p. 117)

A letter written to a Baháʼí on behalf of Shoghi Effendi has a section that gives a clear perspective of the Baháʼí attitude toward mass conversion.

It is not sufficient to number the souls that embrace the Cause to know the progress that it is making. The more important consequences of your activities are the spirit that is diffused into the life of the community, and the extent to which the teachings we proclaim become part of the consciousness and belief of the people that hear them. For it is only when the spirit has thoroughly permeated the world that the people will begin to enter the Faith in large numbers. At the beginning of the spring only the few, exceptionally favoured seeds will sprout, but when the season gets in its full sway, and the atmosphere gets permeated with the warmth of true springtime, then masses of flowers will begin to appear, and a whole hillside suddenly blooms. We are still in the state when only isolated souls are awakened, but soon we shall have the full swing of the season and the quickening of whole groups and nations into the spiritual life breathed by Baháʼu'lláh."

(Letter 18 February 1932, on behalf of Shoghi Effendi)

== See also ==
- History of the Baháʼí Faith
- Baháʼí Faith by country
