= Spiritual Assembly =

Elected councils that govern the Baháʼí Faith on the local and national level

Spiritual Assembly is a term given by ʻAbdu'l-Bahá to refer to elected councils that govern the Baháʼí Faith. Because the Baháʼí Faith has no clergy, they carry out the affairs of the community. In addition to existing at the local level, there are national Spiritual Assemblies (although "national" in some cases refers to a portion of a country or to a group of countries). Spiritual Assemblies form part of the elected branch of the Baháʼí administration.

== Nature and purpose ==
Baháʼu'lláh, ʻAbdu'l-Bahá, and Shoghi Effendi stated how Spiritual Assemblies should be elected by the Baháʼís, defined their nature and purposes, and described in considerable detail how they should function. Since these institutions are grounded in the Baháʼí authoritative texts, Baháʼís regard them as divine in nature, and contrast the wealth of scriptural guidance with the paucity of scriptural texts on which Jewish, Christian, and Islamic religious institutions are based.

The Universal House of Justice has added that among the responsibilities of Local Spiritual Assemblies are to be “channels of divine guidance, planners of the teaching work, developers of human resources, builders of communities, and loving shepherds of the multitudes.” On a practical level, they organize local Baháʼí communities by maintaining a local Baháʼí Fund, owning the local Baháʼí center (if one exists), organizing Baháʼí events, counseling Baháʼís about personal difficulties, assisting with Baháʼí marriages and funerals, providing educational programs to adults and children, publicizing the Baháʼí Faith locally, fostering projects for the social and economic development of the region, and enrolling new members of the religion. Spiritual Assemblies appoint individuals, task forces, and committees to carry out many of their functions. National Spiritual Assemblies have a similar mandate at the national level: they coordinate publishing and distribution of Baháʼí literature, direct relations with national organizations and governmental agencies, oversee the work of local spiritual assemblies, and (in some countries) Regional Councils, set local Baháʼí jurisdictional boundaries, provide various educational services and programs, and set the overall tone and direction of the national community.

== Local Spiritual Assemblies ==
The origin of the institution of the local Spiritual Assembly originates from Baháʼu'lláh's book of laws, the Kitáb-i-Aqdas:

The Lord hath ordained that in every city a House of Justice be established wherein shall gather counsellors to the number of Baha, and should it exceed this number it doth not matter. They should consider themselves as entering the Court of the presence of God, the Exalted, the Most High, and as beholding Him Who is the Unseen. It behoveth them to be the trusted ones of the Merciful among men and to regard themselves as the guardians appointed of God for all that dwell on earth. It is incumbent upon them to take counsel together and to have regard for the interests of the servants of God, for His sake, even as they regard their own interests, and to choose that which is meet and seemly.

The passage gives the institution a name, a minimum number (nine, for “the number of Baha” refers to the numerical value of the letters of that word, which is nine), and a general responsibility to take care of the welfare of others even as they would take care of their own. While the resulting institution is local, in the Kitáb-i-Aqdas Baháʼu'lláh also spoke about the responsibilities of the supreme or Universal House of Justice. In response to the passage, Mírzá Asadu'lláh Isfahání, a prominent Baháʼí teacher, organized an unofficial Baháʼí consultative body in Tehran, Iran, about 1878. The first official Baháʼí consultative body was organized under ʻAbdu'l-Bahá's direction by Hand of the Cause Hají Ákhúnd in Tehran in 1897; by 1899 it was an elected body. Because of the difficulties in Iran caused by persecution of the Baháʼí Faith, the Tehran body served to coordinate both local and national Baháʼí activities. It is not known what name the body was organized under.

The development of a Baháʼí community in the United States in the 1890s necessitated the creation of local Baháʼí consultative bodies there. In 1899 the Baháʼís of Chicago elected a local council based on their awareness of the provisions of the Kitáb-i-Aqdas (which was circulated in provisional English translation as a typescript as early as 1900). The New York Baháʼís elected a “Board of Counsel” in December 1900. In 1901 the Chicago body was reorganized and re-elected and took the name “House of Justice of Bahais of Chicago, Ills.” In response, ʻAbdu'l-Bahá revealed three tablets of encouragement and guidance to the body, including prayers to say at the beginning and end of their meetings, prayers that Baháʼís use around the world today for their Spiritual Assembly meetings.

In 1902 ʻAbdu'l-Bahá sent a very important tablet to the Chicago governing body where he said "let the designation of that body be 'Spiritual Assembly'—this for the reason that, were it to use the term 'House of Justice', the government might hereafter come to suppose that it was acting as a court of law, or concerning itself in political matters, or that, at some indeterminate future time, it would involve itself in the affairs of government.... This same designation hath been universally adopted throughout Iran." For this reason, Baháʼí local and national governing bodies are designated “Spiritual Assemblies” to this day.

The first decade of the twentieth century saw the proliferation of local Baháʼí governing bodies. Often unaware of ʻAbdu'l-Bahá's guidance, they had a variety of titles in English and Persian, such as “Council Board, “Board of Consultation,” “House of Spirituality,” and "Executive Committee." Unaware ʻAbdu'l-Bahá had told the Chicago Baháʼís to elect their body every five years, they were usually elected annually or even semi-annually. The number of members varied from five to nineteen (except in New York City, where ʻAbdu'l-Bahá, in 1911, said they should elect twenty-seven members in order to be inclusive of and to foster unity between that city's diverse Baháʼí groups). They were male only until ʻAbdu'l-Bahá said, in 1911, that women should be elected to the local governing bodies existing in the United States; their exclusion from local bodies continued in Iran until the 1950s, because of Iranian cultural conventions. In the period of 1900 - 1911, consultative bodies are known to have existed in Kenosha, Wisconsin, Boston, Massachusetts, Washington, D.C., Spokane, Washington, northern Hudson County, New Jersey, the greater San Francisco area, California, in the United States; and in Bombay, British Raj India; Cairo, Khedivate of Egypt; Acre, Ottoman Syria; Baku, Tbilisi, Ashgabat and Samarqand in the Russian Empire; and Mashhad, Abadih, Qazvin, and Tabriz, Persia. Consultative bodies also existed for the Jewish and Zoroastrian Baháʼís in Tehran and for the women of a few Baháʼí communities.

Because efforts to organize local Baháʼí consultative bodies remained informal, few additional ones had formed by 1921 (notable exceptions being Cleveland, Ohio, and London), and some of the ones in the United States had lapsed. Upon assuming the Guardianship of the Baháʼí Faith, Shoghi Effendi read ʻAbdu'l-Bahá's Will and Testament and made establishment of local spiritual assemblies an early priority. His second general letter to the Baháʼís of the world, dated March 5, 1922, referred to the “vital necessity of having a local Spiritual Assembly in every locality where the number of adult declared believers exceeds nine.” The letter also quoted extensively from Baháʼu'lláh and ʻAbdu'l-Bahá about the purposes and duties of Spiritual Assemblies.

The result was a rapid proliferation of local Spiritual Assemblies; a 1928 list had the following: Australia, 6; Brazil, 1; Burma, 3; Canada, 2; China, 1; Egypt, 1; England, 4; France, 1; India, 4; Japan, 1; Korea, 1; Lebanon, 1; New Zealand, 1; Palestine, 1; Iran, 5; Russia, 1; South Africa, 1; Switzerland, 1; Syria, 1; Turkey, 1; and the United States, 47, for a total of 85 local Spiritual Assemblies worldwide.

The number has grown ever since; in 2001 there were 11,740 local Spiritual Assemblies worldwide.

== National Spiritual Assemblies ==
National Spiritual Assemblies are first mentioned in ʻAbdu'l-Bahá's Will and Testament, but the fact that they would be established circulated for years before the contents of the Will became publicly available in early 1922. In 1909, Hippolyte Dreyfus wrote extensively about the role of the national House of Justice (as it would have been known then) in his The Universal Religion: Bahaism, Its Rise and Social Import. In that year, also, the Baháʼís of the United States and Canada elected a nine-member “Executive Committee” for the Bahai Temple Unity, a continental consultative body formed to build the Baháʼí House of Worship in Wilmette, Illinois, a suburb of Chicago. Subsequently, the Bahai Temple Unity, which held annual conventions, appointed committees to publish Baháʼí literature, coordinate the spread of the Baháʼí Faith across North America, and review Baháʼí publications for their accuracy. By the time of ʻAbdu'l-Bahá's passing in November 1921, the Bahai Temple Unity functioned as a “national” Baháʼí coordinating body.

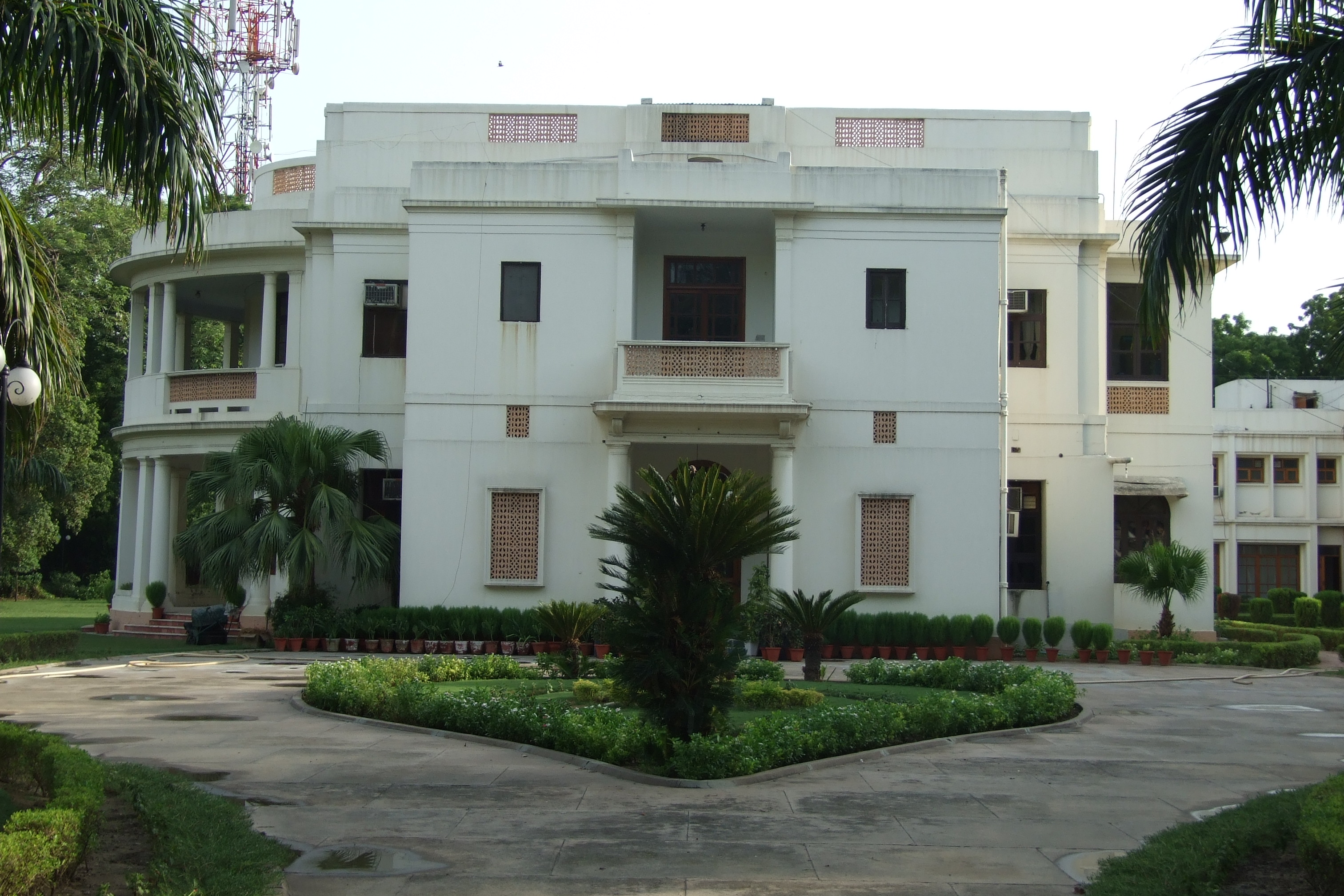
Baháʼí House, New Delhi.

In the same March 5, 1922 letter to the Baháʼís of the world that called for the election of local Spiritual Assemblies, Shoghi Effendi called on them to “indirectly” elect National Spiritual Assemblies. He also enumerated committees that a National Spiritual Assembly should have in order to carry out its responsibilities. “Indirect” election referred to the process, mentioned in the Will and Testament of ʻAbdu'l-Bahá, of the Baháʼís electing one or more delegates from each locality, who would represent them at a national convention and would vote for the nine members of the National Spiritual Assembly. The 1928 issue of The Baháʼí World listed nine National Spiritual Assemblies: Persia (Iran); the United States and Canada; Germany; Great Britain and Ireland; India and Burma; Egypt; Turkistan; Caucasus; and Iraq. Of these, the Iranian body was still the “Central Spiritual Assembly” in Tehran, elected by the Baháʼís of that community; it was not until 1934 that a national Baháʼí membership list could be drawn up that allowed the election of delegates and convening of a fully representative national convention. It is possible that the Turkistan and Caucasus bodies were preliminary as well. By 1953 the number of National Spiritual Assemblies worldwide had increased to 12; in 1963, 56; by 1968, 81, by 1988, 148; by 2001, 182.

An important part of the process was the establishment of “regional” National Spiritual Assemblies; thus in 1951 all of South America elected a single National Spiritual Assembly, but by 1963 nearly every nation on that continent had its own. National Spiritual Assemblies are still being formed as areas of the world achieve religious freedom. Some National Spiritual Assemblies have been formed in areas smaller than a nation: Alaska, Hawaii, and Puerto Rico have their own “national” bodies because they are geographically separated from the lower forty-eight states; Sicily has its own because Shoghi Effendi said major islands also like in the Caribbean should elect independent National Spiritual Assemblies.

Like local Spiritual Assemblies, all National Spiritual Assemblies have nine members and are elected annually, usually during the Ridván Festival (April 21-May 2). All Baháʼí elections occur in an atmosphere of prayer where nominations, campaigning, and all discussion of persons is forbidden.

The members of the National Spiritual Assemblies collectively serve as the electoral college for electing the Universal House of Justice, the supreme governing body of the Baháʼí Faith, which was first formed in 1963.

== See also ==
- Baháʼí Faith by country
- National Spiritual Assembly of the Baháʼís of Iran
