= Baháʼí Faith and Native Americans =

The relationship between Baháʼí Faith and Native Americans has a history reaching back to the lifetime of ʻAbdu'l-Bahá and has multiplied its relationships across the Americas. Individuals have joined the religion and institutions have been founded to serve Native Americans and conversely have Native Americans serve on Baháʼí institutions.

By 1963, Baháʼí sources claimed that members of some 83 tribes of Native Americans had joined the religion. In North America diversification is an ever-present theme in Baháʼí history. Native Americans have been attracted to the Baháʼí Faith in increasing numbers since the 1940s; currently there are several thousand American Indian and Alaska Native Baháʼís, especially in rural Alaska and among the Navajo and Lakota peoples. There are also substantial populations of native Baháʼís among Central and South American Indians. There is an estimate of some 8,000 Guaymi Baháʼís in the area of Panama, about 10% of the population of Guaymi in Panama. An informal summary of the Wayuu (a tribe living in La Guajira Desert) community in 1971 showed about 1,000 Baháʼís. The largest population of Baháʼís in South America is in Bolivia, a country whose population is estimated to be 55%–70% indigenous and 30%–42% Mestizo, with a Baháʼí population estimated at 206,000 in 2005 according to the Association of Religion Data Archives.

== Native American religions ==
=== Acceptance of spiritual founders ===
Shoghi Effendi, head of the religion from 1921 to 1957, stated: "The fundamental principle enunciated by Baháʼu'lláh, the followers of his Faith firmly believe, is that religious truth is not absolute but relative, that Divine Revelation is a continuous and progressive process, that all the great religions of the world are divine in origin, that their basic principles are in complete harmony, that their aims and purposes are one and the same, that their teachings are but facets of one truth, that their functions are complementary, that they differ only in the nonessential aspects of their doctrines, and that their missions represent successive stages in the spiritual evolution of human society."

In principle, a Baháʼí can certainly affirm that Messengers of God have indeed been sent to all peoples, according to Baháʼí belief, but that there is simply no conclusive way to attest legendary culture heroes individually. Under no circumstances does this prevent a real appreciation of such legends, and of the spiritual and cultural values enshrined in them. Thus, Baháʼí authorities may consider adding the category of (rather than names of) Messengers of God to First Nations, or Messengers of God to Indigenous Peoples. The problem now is no longer the principle, but rather the question of names.

The National Spiritual Assembly of the Baháʼís of Canada took a position of advocacy on behalf of First Nations Canadians in its formal submission to the Royal Commission on Aboriginal Peoples in the fall of 1993 on behalf of indigenous people (not in relation to their religion, per se.) Baháʼí pioneers to regions with aboriginal peoples have extended Baháʼí universalism in religion to a recognition of the richness and authenticity of native cultural values. Explicit recognition of individual native messengers of God has yet to be formalised in Baháʼí doctrine. The quote from an authenticated source most directly reflecting on the issue is:

In ancient times the people of America were, through their northern regions, close to Asia, that is, separated from Asia by a strait. For this reason, it hath been said that crossing had occurred. There are other signs which indicate communication.

As to places whose people were not informed of the appearance of Prophets, such people are excused. In the Qur'án it hath been revealed: 'We will not chastise them if they had not been sent a Messenger' (Q. 17:15).

Undoubtedly in those regions the Call of God must have been raised in ancient times, but it hath been forgotten now.

In this particular context, the expression "Call of God" (nidá-yi iláhí) is a transparent, according to Christopher Buck, reference to Prophets of God and who give revelation. Scholars like Susan Maneck and William Collins have taken note of the strength of this quote. However the language is not specific. The Universal House of Justice notes that "The Baháʼí Teachings do not explicitly confirm, nor do they rule out, the possibility that Messengers of God have appeared in the Americas. In the absence of a clear Text the Universal House of Justice has no basis for issuing the kind of statement you propose which would confirm, "in principle, that God sent Manifestations to the indigenous peoples of the Americas."" Nevertheless, the figure of Deganawida, The Great Peacemaker, is mentioned as a leading example in scholarly research; others mentioned by individuals include Quetzalcoatl and Viracocha. David Ruhe, a former member of the Universal House of Justice, has written mentioning his own view of Deganawida as a Prophet. Since no individual or institution can add to Baháʼí scripture it is impossible to add a specific name to a list of accepted Manifestations of God that would be binding on all Baháʼís and Baháʼí institutions. However individuals and institutions may accept for their own purposes that various cultural heroes may have been in fact a Manifestation of God and Baháʼís and institutions of the religion can accept the fact that sacred Native American tradition has mentioned specific names for individuals acting in the role of a Prophet.

=== Interpretation of prophecy ===
In 1986 North American Baháʼí Lee Brown gave a talk at the 1986 Baháʼí Continental Indigenous Council held at Tanana Valley Fairgrounds, Fairbanks, Alaska, which was recorded and transcribed—it includes his interpretation of Native American, especially Hopi, prophecies. Brown also appeared with Martha Many Grey Horses on a Baháʼí program discussing these prophecies.

Guaymi Baháʼís have stated there are prophecies from their own tribe's religion that they interpret to relate to the Baháʼí Faith. The prophecies of the Chilam Balam have been examined as well.

There has been comment among prominent Baháʼís about the White Buffalo Calf Woman and the appearance of the white buffalo.

Chief Albert Isaac of Aishihik is recorded as having identified a near death experience of his in 1957 with the Baháʼí Faith.

== Contacting the indigenous ==
=== First contact ===
Honoré Jaxon, who had been involved in the Métis and First Nations-associated Red River Rebellion, joined the Baháʼí Faith in the late 1890s and is among the earliest documented Indigenous-associated figures connected to the religion in North America.

During the 1940s, Jaxon devoted himself to establishing a library for First Nations in Saskatchewan and collected books, newspapers, and pamphlets relating to the Métis people. In 1951, at the age of 90, he was evicted from his New York apartment and the collection was reportedly discarded at a New York City dump shortly before his death. Baháʼí teachings of the period emphasized the education and guidance of Indigenous peoples. In the Tablets of the Divine Plan, ʻAbdu'l-Bahá wrote: “Attach great importance to the indigenous population of America … should these Indians and aborigines be educated and guided, there is no doubt that through the divine teachings, they will become so enlightened as in turn to shed light to all regions.”

=== ʻAbdu'l-Bahá ===
In 1912 then head of the religion ʻAbdu'l-Bahá took a journey to the West from what was then Palestine. On one leg of his trips as he was leaving Canada, on the way back to the States, and he traveled through several villages. As the train passed through the town of Belleville, Ontario, a four-year-old Mohawk boy, Jimmy Loft, was sitting on a fence as the train passed. ʻAbdu'l-Bahá took that moment to stand up and, facing the window, smile and wave. Loft was so surprised he toppled off the fence. In May 1948 he became one of the first native American Baháʼís of Canada.

==== Tablet to Amr Khan ====
A tablet written by Abdu'l-Bahá, undated but certainly from before his death in 1921 and probably from after 1892, is called the Tablet to Amr Khan, in which he acknowledges that "the Call of God" must have arisen in the Americas though its spiritual effect had been forgotten.

==== ʻAbdu'l-Bahá's Tablets of the Divine Plan ====
ʻAbdu'l-Bahá also wrote a series of letters, or tablets, to the followers of the religion in the United States in 1916–1917; these letters were compiled together in the book Tablets of the Divine Plan. The sixth of the tablets was the first to mention Latin American regions and was written on April 8, 1916, but was delayed in being presented in the United States until 1919—after the end of the First World War and the Spanish flu. The sixth tablet was translated and presented by Mirza Ahmad Sohrab on April 4, 1919, and published in Star of the West magazine on December 12, 1919. After mentioning the need for the message of the religion to visit the Latin American countries ʻAbdu'l-Bahá continued:

Attach great importance to the indigenous population of America. For these souls may be likened unto the ancient inhabitants of the Arabian Peninsula, who, prior to the Mission of Muḥammad, were like unto savages. When the light of Muḥammad shone forth in their midst, however, they became so radiant as to illumine the world. Likewise, these Indians, should they be educated and guided, there can be no doubt that they will become so illumined as to enlighten the whole world ...

Following the Tablets and about the time of ʻAbdu'l-Bahá's passing in 1921, a few other Baháʼís began moving to, or at least visiting, Latin or South America. First Martha Root followed by Leonora Armstrong were among the first to make this trips before 1928.

=== 1920s ===
The next known contact between Native Americans and Baháʼís is the case of Albert T. Freeman, also known as Gai-Wah-Go-Wah, who was an award-winning orator as an Indian of the Lakota people in 1917. He was soon a graduate of Depauw University and visible as a Christian and an actor. Around 1920-1924 he was a student at University of Southern California and took up the Chautauqua educational speaker platforms similar to Nipo T. Strongheart of the Yakama Nation. Many of his talks were at Churches though some were at museums but in 1926 on a tour of the West he gave a lecture/performance at the Baháʼí center in Portland Oregon and was then invited from there to present at the Baháʼí national convention. He continued on afterwards in various churches and colleges into the 1930s. Record of his service has been noted in educational materials in recent decades.

=== Systematic efforts ===
Sara E. Whitt was held the leader of a series of banquets in cooperation with the Local Assembly of Los Angeles "widening the circle of racial amity activities so as to include not only the white and coloured, but the red Natives, aborigines of America, also the Chinese and Japanese ..." A number of banquets were held - one on Feb 27, 1932 was noted with particular prominence with Nellie S. French representing the national assembly and Luther Standing Bear offered a prayer and spoke on peace. Other speakers included Robert Theiss, Joseph R. Scherer, Emmett R. Smith, J. Kam Machida, W. J. Clarendon, Nipo Strongheart, and Willard P. Hatch and a farewell by Shahnaz Waite.

Shoghi Effendi, who was named ʻAbdu'l-Bahá's successor, wrote a cable on May 1, 1936, to the Baháʼí Annual Convention of the United States and Canada, and asked for the systematic implementation of ʻAbdu'l-Bahá's vision to begin and its first large focus was the entire southern American region and its peoples. In his cable he wrote:

Appeal to assembled delegates ponder historic appeal voiced by ʻAbdu'l-Bahá in Tablets of the Divine Plan. Urge earnest deliberation with incoming National Assembly to insure its complete fulfillment. First century of Baháʼí Era drawing to a close. Humanity entering outer fringes most perilous stage its existence. Opportunities of present hour unimaginably precious. Would to God every State within American Republic and every Republic in American continent might ere termination of this glorious century embrace the light of the Faith of Baháʼu'lláh and establish structural basis of His World Order.

Following the May 1st cable, another cable from Shoghi Effendi came on May 19 calling for permanent pioneers to be established in all the countries of Latin America. The Baháʼí National Spiritual Assembly of the United States and Canada was appointed the Inter-America Committee to take charge of the preparations. During the 1937 Baháʼí North American Convention, Shoghi Effendi cabled advising the convention to prolong their deliberations to permit the delegates and the National Assembly to consult on a plan that would enable Baháʼís to go to Latin America as well as to include the completion of the outer structure of the Baháʼí House of Worship in Wilmette, Illinois. In 1937 the First Seven Year Plan (1937–44), which was an international plan designed by Shoghi Effendi, gave the American Baháʼís the goal of establishing the Baháʼí Faith in every country in Latin America. With the spread of American Baháʼís communities and assemblies began to form in 1938 across Latin America.

Across the Americas by 1947 the Baháʼí Faith had contacted peoples among the Eskimos of Alaska and Greenland, the Cree Natives of Prairie Provinces, Canada, the Cherokee Natives in North Carolina, the Oneida Natives in Wisconsin, the Omaha Natives in Nebraska, the Seminole Natives in Florida, the Mexican Natives in Mexico, the Natives of the San Blas Islands, the Natives of Chichicastenango in Guatemala, the Mayans in Yucatán, the Patagonian Natives in Argentina, the Natives of La Paz in Bolivia and the Inca Natives in Peru. In 1944 Gerardo Vega, of Costa Rica, was the first Latin-American native to pioneer when he began work in Panama. Regional committees overseeing various countries of Latin and South America were appointed. Retrospectively a stated purpose for the committee was to facilitate a shift in the balance of roles from North American guidance and Latin cooperation to Latin guidance and North American cooperation. Back in North America, the first all-Native assembly in the Americas was first established in 1948 on the Omaha Indian Reservation at Macy, Nebraska. The process was well underway by 1950 and was to be enforced about 1953. Shoghi Effendi then called for two international conventions to be held at April 1951; one was held in Panama City for the purpose of electing a regional National Spiritual Assembly

The nineteenth objective of that portion of the Ten Year Crusade entrusted in 1953 to the American Baháʼí Community by its architect was the "conversion to the Faith of members of the leading Native American tribes." In August 1957 Shoghi Effendi reminded the regional assembly of the comment of Abdu'l-Baha and would therefore devote considerable energy on the matter. A Baháʼí made a trip to Dominica specifically to try to reach the Carib Indians on May 7, 1959. In Mexico in March 1957 the first Indians joining the religion are noted. A committee focused on that need was active by April 1958 in making contacts and translating materials. Baháʼí observers were welcomed at an Inter-American Indian Congress in the city of Guatemala in 1959 thanks to their contacts with local versions of inter-American Indian institutes in the region and included opportunities for sharing native and Spanish translations of Baháʼí pamphlets. The first all-Indian assembly of Mexico was elected in San Rafael Comac near Cholula, Puebla in 1960. Hand of the Cause Enoch Olinga specifically visited this assembly in May 1961.

By 1961 a number of developments had been achieved. There was the election of the Bolivian national assembly—representative of a community the vast majority of whom were of the Aymara people. Some thirteen hundred of these Indians, in over one hundred localities had joined the religion and over twenty local assemblies in Bolivia had been elected. There were elections of Indian assemblies in Ecuador, Guatemala and Mexico—regions of the former Incas, Mayas, and Aztecs and the formation four assemblies representative of Canadian Indians in the Yukon, Alberta and Saskatchewan. At that time there were over forty Indian and Eskimo tribes represented in the Baháʼí Community throughout the Western Hemisphere—more than double the number in 1957. In 1961 each country of a regional assembly of southern South America elected its own National Spiritual Assembly. In 1961 the Hands of the Cause of the Americas took special note of the spread of the religion among the Indians across the continents. Paraguay's national convention was witnessed by Hand of the Cause, Dr. Ramatu'llah Muhajir. At the convention Dr. Muhajir and the delegates drew up plans for reaching the Indian populations as well as ways to reinforce the communities that already existed. Still in 1961 the National Spiritual Assembly of Panama sent two official representatives, Edna Moses and Donald R. Witzel, to a congress of natives on the San Blas Islands. The Baháʼís presented an outline of the religion. A chief countered that other religionists had presented their religions as a means to divide the people from their tribal religion.

Before 1963 the first two all-Indian Local Spiritual Assemblies in South America were Huanuni and then Vilcollo, Bolivia—by 1963 there were twenty five such assemblies in Bolivia and about 1000 Baha'is among the Bolivian Indian peoples. A team formed to promulgate the religion—a chief of the Peigan Reserve, also chair of its first Baháʼí assembly, and an elected member of the Band Council for the Peigan Band of the Blackfoot and John Hellson, a Baháʼí formerly of Cornwall, England, now of Alberta, who is an adopted member of the Mohawk nation. Together they carried letters of introduction to the chiefs of all the Six Nations of the Grand River First Nation in Ontario and Quebec and were welcomed with a special ceremony on some of the Reserves. Their itinerary included Reserves of Nanaimo and Capilano of British Columbia, Ohsweken, Kettle Point, Tyendinaga, and Curve Lake of Ontario, and Kahnawake, Quebec.

By 1963 there was a small group in Pedro Juan Caballero in Costa Rica and some of whom were from the "Caygüa", who were possibly the Kadiweu people. In the United States, following initial presences among several Indian nations in the 1950s, in late February 1963 a gathering of Indian Baháʼís in Arizona for a "Great Council Fire", which was attended by Hand of the Cause Dhikru'llah Khadem at a time when members of 34 American tribes were represented within the Baháʼí Faith and twenty six were present. Asking attendees who had most recently joined the religion to speak up, and echoing a Baháʼí teaching on the unity of religions, Strongheart said:

"an acknowledgement rather than a declaration." He recalled that his father had taken him as a young man into the towering forests of the north-west and, sitting beneath majestic trees, had related to him the universal Indian tradition of the brotherhood, counseling him, "The birds sing different songs, but they fly in the same sky; the trees have different bark and bear different fruit, but all grow from Mother Earth."

In the national convention of 1964 of Costa Rica members of the Talamanca and Terraba were among the delegates. The first native American Baháʼí of Paraguay, Rosendo Segundo, joined the religion in 1964. Segundo was a member of the Guarani of the Chaco tribe. A national plan of the Baháʼís of the United States in 1964 included officially translating basic literature of the religion "for an increasing number of American Indian believers" and later added a goal to raise the number of assemblies, local organizational and administrative units of the religion, on reservations. In 1965 actual contact with the Chaco tribe began. Grandchildren of Sitting Bull and Bull Head were noted as friends in meetings in 1966. A Pennacook Indian, Gerard Morin aka Little Bishop, presented on local Indian culture in Green Acre Baháʼí School in 1966. A multi-national group including an Indian toured North Bay, Ontario, Canada, in 1967. In 1969 members of the Chulupi speaking and Lengua tribes had converted to the religion and first all-Indian institute in northern Gran Chaco area, in Paraguay with members of the Guarani, Guasurango, (a Tapieté speaking) and Chulupi attending. In 1970 the first Yanaigua (another Tapieté speaking) tribe member joined the religion and that year was first time an indigenous Baháʼí was elected to the national assembly, (in 1982 there were three indigenous members of the national assembly.) In February 1970 pioneer family of Samuel and Teresa Garcia and their four children, native Costa Ricans, in February 1970 to the area of Guanacaste seeking to identify members of lapsed communities. Come April 1970 eight Local Assemblies were re-established following which a number of programs were initiated to solidify the understanding of some of these new Baháʼís.

In 1975–6 Rúhíyyih Khanum travelled by boat through the tributaries of the Amazon River of Brazil and also visiting the high mountain ranges of Peru and Bolivia. Thirty six tribal groups were visited over a period of six months; the trip was called The Green Light Expedition, which followed Khanum's The Great African Safari. There have also been projects developed from the original expedition - In the Footsteps of the Green Light Expedition and Tear of the Clouds. And in 1977 a radio campaign began in Paraguay. The first Guaymí Baháʼí dates back into the 1960s, and since the 1980s there have been several projects started and evolving in those communities.

February 1977 a conference looking at promulgating the religion in Mexico also took place in Mérida with more than 2000 Baháʼís attending. One third of the participants were indigenous believers from across Central America 150 of whom were Mayans. Non-Baháʼí family members of the Indians were allowed to fully attend the meeting. Three Hands of the Cause were present - Paul Haney, Rahmatu'lláh Muhájir, and Enoch Olinga, as well as Counsellor Florence Mayberry who had been on the first national assembly of Mexico. From 1978 a series of Indian Council Fires began to be held and initiatives adopted - see below.

In 1990 the first assembly entirely composed of indigenous people in Brazil was elected from the Mura people in Beruri, Brazil. In 1994 Elizabeth Dahe, a long-time Baháʼí and Hopi elder, invited the other Hopi elders to gather and meet Kevin Locke who presented the claims of the Baháʼí Faith directly to 100 Hopi elders. Baháʼís claim nearly half of the Chilean Baháʼí community is of the indigenous Mapuche people.

Baháʼís in Cape Dorset acted with support and coordination through the spiritual assembly of the Omaha Reservation and of Springfield Illinois. And an assembly was elected in Lac du Flambeau, Wisconsin.

=== Cultural relationships and challenges ===
The cultural norms in the Baháʼí Faith have gone through major transitions. The first occurred at about the turn of the 20th century when the religion became known beyond its mainly Muslim Middle-Eastern population and spread to Christian North America and Europe. The foundations of this achievement had been laid from the earliest days of the new religion when Baháʼu'lláh in two of his writings from the Baghdad period addressed Christian issues. Then towards the end of the nineteenth century, the famous Baháʼí scholar, Mírzá Abu'l-Faḍl, extended these foundations by writing extensively on Baháʼí approaches to the New and Old Testaments. This was followed by the conversion of numerous Jews, in Iran, and Christians, in Syria and Egypt, to the religion. It was Syrian Christian converts in particular who were largely responsible for taking the Baháʼí Faith to Christian North America, from where there was further spread to Europe and Australia. See also ʻAbdu'l-Bahá's journeys to the West. The second major breakthrough started post-World War II when the religion began to spread rapidly in the villages of the Third World. Some idea of the extent of this comparatively sudden change can be gleaned from the fact that prior to 1954, approximately 94% of the world Baháʼí population consisted of Iranians. By 1989, that figure is about 7% while Baháʼís from the non-Muslim Third World represent some 90% of the Baháʼís.

In Latin and South America the religion spread in the 1940s following specific plans of promulgating the religion. A stated purpose for the coordinating committees appointed to oversee the process was to facilitate a shift in the balance of roles from North American leading guidance and Latin cooperation to Latin leading guidance and North American cooperation. The process was well underway by 1950 and was to be enforced about 1953. However a period of "re-activating" core communities was necessary in 1950, while other communities failed to re-elect their institutions initially though the regional committees continued operation. Nevertheless, regional National Spiritual Assemblies for the region were elected in 1950 and 1951. By 1961 most Latin and South American countries had their own national assembly.

In Africa there was widespread conversions to the religion following the 1950s. It was emphasized that western pioneers be self-effacing and focus their efforts not on the colonial leadership but on the native Africans - and that the pioneers must show by actions the sincerity of their sense of service to the Africans in bringing the religion and then the Africans who understand their new religion are to be given freedom to rise up and spread the religion according to their own sensibilities and the pioneers to disperse or step into the background. Enoch Olinga is specifically mentioned as an example of this process unfolding as he arose out of Uganda and repeated the quick growth of the religion. Because of the successive waves of people becoming Knights of Baháʼu'lláh, Enoch Olinga was entitled "Abd'l-Futuh", a Persian name meaning "the father of victories" by Shoghi Effendi though he too implemented changes in character by giving up alcoholism and eventually polygamy.

In India where the Baháʼí message had for decades been primarily addressed to Indian Muslims and Parsees (Zoroastrians), a re-interpretation of the Baháʼí message in accordance with Hindu ideas was necessary to reach the masses of Hindus. India became the largest Baháʼí community in the world in 2000 after less than a century of mass teaching though it also entailed systematically reaching a large community of Untouchables or Harijans. See Baháʼí Faith in India.

Unlike the spread of Christianity within indigenous areas in the United States, the spread of the Baháʼí Faith has never been associated with a fortification of colonial occupation, Euro-American assimilation, or forced conversions of Native Americans. Indeed, in 1960 Hand of the Cause Rúhíyyih Khánum asked for forgiveness for the injustices her race had done and praised their great past. And in 1963 anthropologist Alice Beck Kehoe, a well known researcher of Native Americans, observed that "[The Baháʼí Faith] does not deny the validity of native Indian beliefs, [and] ... appeals to many Indians who are seeking a religion that is neither exclusively Indian nor dominated by white values and customs." However another researcher observed in 2007: "Most white Canadians and Americans have no clue with respect to how constantly they reinforce their own cultural assumptions, right or wrong, and pile them upon Indians, never willing or even interested in hearing our own Native view. I agree that the Baháʼís in Canada and the U.S. have made some good headway in the honoring and validating native spiritual prophecies and principles. However, much more transformation along the lines of intercultural interactions within the Baháʼí international community needs to take place. In particular, I am referring specifically to most (but not all) of our non-Native Baháʼís who find it impossible to break through the inner barriers of their own Euro-American culture."

Patterns of encounters between non-Aboriginal Baha'is and Aboriginal people in British Columbia were studied and the result demonstrated a middle ground between romanticization and violent confrontation was possible, though not fully realized. However, in the words of an historian the encounter with the religion "has nevertheless served as a potent source of empowerment for Aboriginal adherents." The traditions of the people weren't left and again served to solidify community. But there is progress in appreciation of Indian cultural and spiritual experience coming through Baháʼí publishing channels just as there has been of Islam over a century ago.

== Projects engaging Native Americans ==
=== Baháʼí radio ===
Baháʼí radio in Ecuador evolved as a way to serve the thousands of converts in the late 1960s and 1970s. A native of Otavalo, Ecuador and chairman of the National Spiritual Assembly of Ecuador investigated using radio as a tool for spreading the religion and serving the newly forming communities. In early 1973, Raul Pavon leased Radio Turismo station and initiated fourteen hours of daily broadcasts. None involved had backgrounding in running a radio station. Initial success was based on playing local and national music genre. In July 1973 the national assembly added the goal of a radio station to its budget and a committee to create programing. Programming was developed and aired in eight cities between 15-minute segments up to hour-long bilingual (Spanish-Quichua) programs of Baháʼí prayers, and drawing from Baháʼí literature as well as information of its world-wide community. In 1975, training workshops were organized for scriptwriters. Other trainings continued in 1976. By 1976 the committee had produced 1286 hours of programming at a cost of approximately $2000 as well as documentation to support sister projects. A low-power AM radio station which was finally granted in 1977. There were challenges of coordination and staffing to overcome. Outside trainers or professional staff were able to come in 1977, 1978, and 1980. A commission was developed, typically including a body composed of an indigenous person, a "white" person, technical experts, senior Baháʼís and a veteran of the station, with a balance of majority of local people while also one member to be literate and capable of dealing with the administration of the commission.

With regular feedback from experienced institutions operating out of the Baháʼí World Centre, progress was maintained and Dr. David Ruhe, then a member of the Universal House of Justice, visited in 1980 and acted as liaison between the radio station and the Audio-Visual Department at the Baháʼí administrative offices. In 1980 almost the entire staff traveled to Peru to make extensive presentations to the international Baháʼí media conference in Puno where the second Baháʼí Radio station would be set up. It was not until 1981 that a suitable director was able to take up service by combining the qualities of being a Baháʼí, an experienced radio professional, and an Ecuadoran and able to volunteer. In addition to Quinteros, six other indigenous had systematically begun to serve at the station as full-time staff as well as larger numbers of part-time staff amounting to some 200 persons including indigenous youth in the first four years of the operation of the station. Indigenous staff were able to conduct workshops for other indigenous staff, in Spanish and Quichua, for the first time in 1981. Staff for projects in Bolivia, Chile and Peru participated in successive training and Ecuadoran staff traveled to Peru and Bolivia to assist in those projects. The Commission wrote to the Chilean Baháʼís about the development of their radio station that:

The most important and indispensable thing is to maintain a happy, loving, spirited team-family. Try to have as high a percentage as possible of your staff native. At least 75%. It is far better to let a native do something wrong than not to give him the opportunity by having a foreigner do it.

By 1983 training of staff at Radio Baháʼí Ecuador was almost entirely in the hands of indigenous staff. There has also been training at the Amoz Gibson Training Center for Baháʼí Media in Puerto Rico operated by CIRBAL (Centro para Intercambio Radiofonico Baháʼí de America Latina.)

=== Native American Baháʼí Institute ===
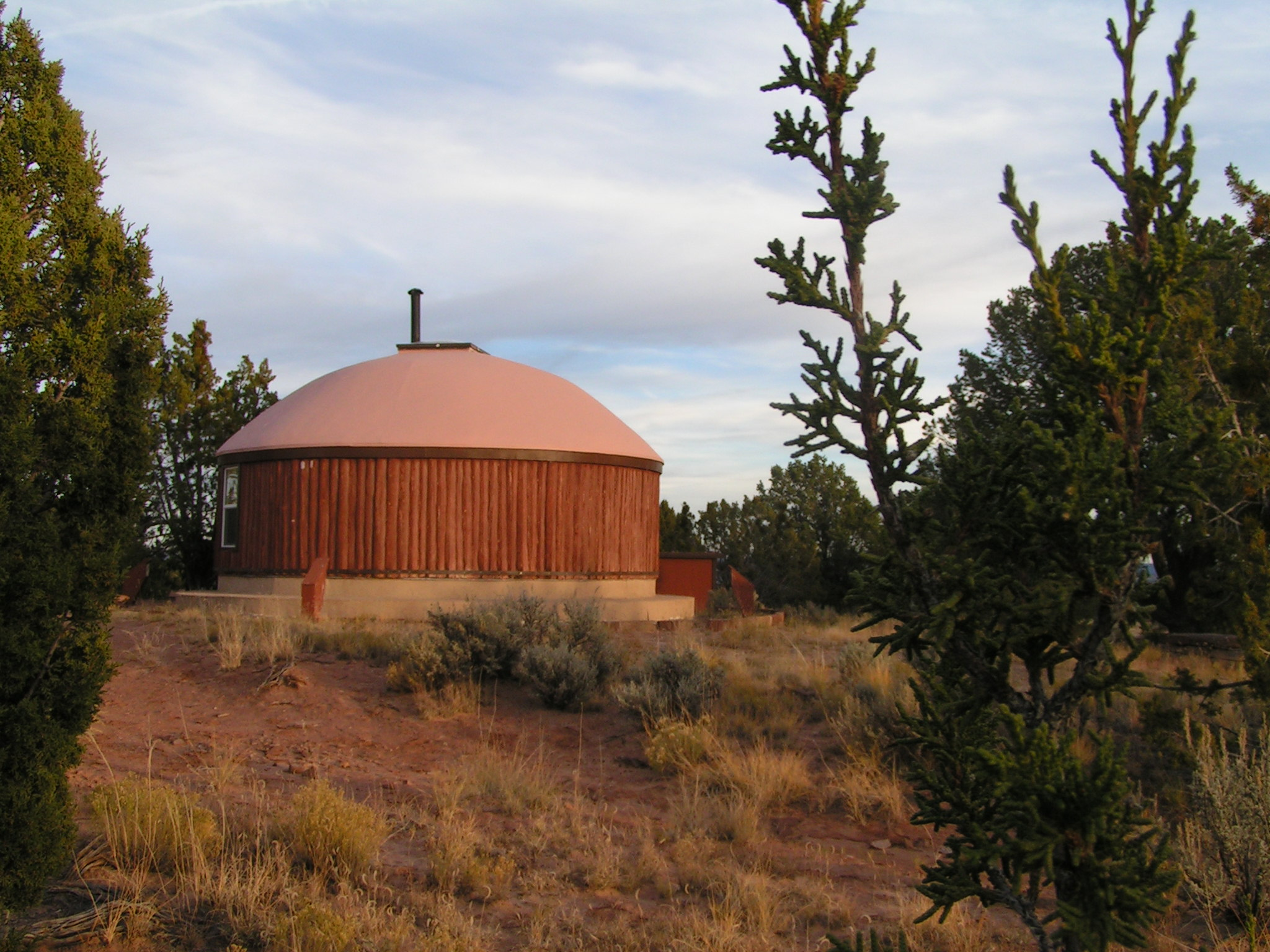
A prayer hogan at the Native American Baháʼí Institute

In 1978 some 60 Native Baháʼís and their pioneer friends (40 of whom were from Navajo-Hopi land) attended the U.S. Baháʼí National Convention at the invitation of the U.S. National Spiritual Assembly to honor the achievement of winning the first goal of the 5-Year-Plan—the establishment of 25 Local Spiritual Assemblies on Indian Reservations. They wanted to build a "Baháʼí place" on the Navajo Reservation, and they wanted the convention to show their support. With the assent of the convention, the National Spiritual Assembly members hurriedly met and announced their approval of this new institution. Two years later, the Houck, Arizona property was secured and the institute became manifest. Named the Native American Baháʼí Institute (NABI) by the National Spiritual Assembly, NABI was designated an agency of the National Spiritual Assembly thereby becoming one of the five permanent school and institutes. Over the years it has been focused upon various goals. Since 1998, it has been designated a Regional Training Institute by the National Spiritual Assembly, and has been immersed in advancing the goals of the Training Institute process among Native Americans. In 2001 it began publishing the Navaho–Hopi Baháʼí Newsletter. In 2005 a socio-economic development project carried out at NABI was Media Training Pilot which trained youth to conduct film interviews of two Navajo artists which was released as a local video. Arya Laghaie was a volunteer who is buried there in 2007.

=== Spirit Runners ===
From May to August 2000 Spirit Runners extended the engagement of native Baháʼís, and one of the members of the Trail of Light expeditions, traveling across North America from Seattle, Washington to Shinnecock, New York.

There have been successive trips by groups from the 1990s into 2002 when the Native American Baháʼí Institute hosted a gathering for Trail travelers.

=== The Trail of Light and Native Baháʼí Councils ===
==== Great Council Fire ====
In late February 1963 Native Baháʼís and others gathered for a "Great Council Fire" which was attended by Hand of the Cause Dhikru'llah Khadem at a time when members of some 34 American tribes were represented within the religion and twenty six were present.

==== First Native Bahá´í Council of North America ====
During the international convention for the election of the Universal House of Justice in Haifa in April 1978 a meeting was held with representatives of the other circumpolar national Baháʼí communities: Finland, Sweden, Norway, Iceland, Denmark (on behalf of Greenland), and Canada. It was decided then to form a Continental Indigenous Council committee under the supervision of the National Spiritual Assembly of Alaska, and a four-member Eskimo-Indian team was formed to travel for 45 days in 10 European countries during the summer. The Indian members of the team were Scott Tyler of the United States and Melba Loft of Canada; the Eskimos were Ida Bergamaschi and Maynard Eakan of Alaska. The idea for the Trail of Light occurred during preparations for the first Baha'i Native Council, held in 1978 on the Yakama Indian Reservation in Washington State when the national assemblies of Canada, Alaska and the United States were discussing the event. Another inspiration for the Trail of Light was the concept of promulgating the religion among the indigenous peoples in the Pacific Rim that was described by the Hand of the Cause Rahmátu'llah Muhájir in 1978. The Trail of Light, also known as Camino del Sol, was defined as a process whereby native Baháʼís engaged with diverse native peoples about a number of issues including promulgating their religion as well as organizing councils for the people and encouraged discovery of mutual cultural links across the native peoples. The first Trail of Light traveling trip by 22 members of the religion occurred spontaneously immediately after the council.

==== Second Native Baháʼí Council of North America ====
In 1980 an estimated 1,000 Native American members of the religion and their guests gathered for the second American Baháʼí Native Council at a powwow along with Hand of the Cause Dhikru'llah Khadem and Amoz Gibson, with long contact with Indian populations and then a member of the Universal House of Justice. The event was sponsored by the Baháʼí Continental Indigenous Council, which was composed of three Indigenous believers from each of the national assemblies of North America. After the council meeting, a three-day training and deepening program developed plans and teams of Baháʼís to travel to different regions to promulgate the religion among the Native Americans. These teams of Indigenous Baháʼís from Canada, Alaska, and the 48 contiguous United States represented ten tribes under the name Trail of Light.

One team visited six Native villages in Alaska from July 18 to August 1. Team members were Tina Salomon, an Osage/Cherokee from Sparks, Nevada; Mary Jane Tevuk, an Iñupiaq from Nome, Alaska; Regina Steffes, a Navajo/Oneida from Fontana, California; and team captain Chester Kahn, a Diné from Houck, Arizona (later a member of the National Spiritual Assembly of the United States); Bill Ekomiak, an Inuk from Daysland, Alberta, Canada; Johan Lyberth, an Inuk from Nuuk, Greenland.

A second team visited Indian Reserves and cities in Northern Saskatchewan, Canada, included Henry Bainbridge, a Navajo from Teec Nos Pos, Arizona; Ernestine Moore, a Northern Paiute/Washoe from Reno, Nevada; Maynard Eakan, an Iñupiaq from Anchorage, Alaska, and member of the National Spiritual Assembly of Alaska; Shirley Lindstrom, a Tlingit from Mayo, Yukon, Canada; team captain Noni Nelson, a Métis from Enderby, British Columbia, Canada; Peter Singyke, an Iñupiaq from Anchorage, Alaska; Rita Blumenstein, an Unangax/Athabascan/Yup'ik from Palmer, Alaska; Dennis Bainbridge, age 9, a Navajo from Teec-Nos-Pos, Arizona.

One of the teams split in two and traveled from the north to the south starting mid-June and traveled among the people in Mexico, Belize, Costa Rica, Guatemala, Honduras, and Panama. While in Panama they gathered with more than 1,000 Guaymi Baháʼís joined by Costa Rican Guaymi, Talamanca, and Teribe representatives and they agreed on founding a Native Council for the Panamanian and Costa Rican tribes. The Trail of Light team then continued through Bolivia, Chile, Peru and finally Ecuador. In Ecuador the team was presented to the audience at a conference in May 1982 dedicated to the anniversary of the death of Bahíyyih Khánum. Representatives of 24 of the 29 national assemblies in Latin America and the Caribbean, and members of 21 Indian tribes from Bolivia, Brazil, Canada, Chile, Colombia, Ecuador, Panama, Peru, the United States and Venezuela were present.

==== Third Council of North America ====
In August 1982 the third North American Native Council was held gathering Hand of the Cause Rúhíyyih Khanum and four hundred forty-six Baháʼís and their guests from 10 countries and representing 60 Indian tribes on the Blood Indian Reserve in southwestern Alberta, Canada. Following this conference, Rúhíyyih Khanum traveled across Canada and into Greenland and Iceland visiting civic leaders and Baháʼí communities. She met people from Fountain Reserve and Thunderbird Reserve. At the close of the tour in September the team presented an Indian ceremonial blanket to Rúhíyyih Khanum who responded by joining them in a dance. Follow-up meetings after the Trail travelers came through occurred in November in Alaska and December in Honduras.

In 1984 a reprise of the Trail of Light was undertaken when an international team of five Baháʼís spent 17 days in Guatemala; they were a Mapuche Indian from Chile, a Quechua from Peru, a Bribri from Costa Rica, and two Guaymis from Panama.

A 1984-5 continuation of the Trail of Light process brought Costa Rican indigenous Baháʼís into Veracruz Mexico.

After the religion grew among the Guaymi, they in turn offered service in 1985–6 with the Trail of Light project included indigenous Guaymí Baháʼís of Panama traveling with the Venezuelan indigenous Carib speaking and Guajira Baháʼís through the Venezuelan states of Bolívar, Amazonas and Zulia sharing their religion. The Baháʼí Guaymí Cultural Centre was built in the Chiriqui district (which was split in 1997 to create the Ngöbe-Buglé district) and used as a seat for the Panamanian Ministry of Education's literacy efforts in the 1980s. In 1985 Trail of Light began its work in Colombia. Among the participants were two youth from the Guaymi tribe in Panama; six members from the Guajiros, the Colombo-Venezuelan tribe, and two youth from the Paez, a tribe in southern Colombia. The traveled to the Guajira region and re-affirmed the religion among the Baháʼís there and the group performed dances which inspired the Guajiros to offer their own dance, the Chichamaya. The group was invited to the local high school where the Guaymis shared the story of the impact of the religion among their people (see Baháʼí Faith in Panama). The group was then invited to the elementary school. From Guajira the group headed to Valledupar and then on to the homeland of the Arhuaco tribe in the Sierra Nevada de Santa Marta. There the group met with the leadership, the Mamos, or elders of the community for permission to present the message they had come to give. Various of the group presented to the Mamos including the Guaymi and their interpretation of their own prophecies. An elder shared that the Arhuaco had a similar prophecy. The Trail of Light group was allowed to make their presentations and exchanges of dances and talks followed. From there the group traveled to see the Yukpa (Yuko) tribe. With the Yuko the group was able to hold a unity feast and shared dances and stayed for three days before heading home.

==== 1988 Council ====
The 1988 North American Native Council as sponsored by the National Assembly of the Baháʼís of the United States and the group met with members of the assembly. The members of the U.S. National Assembly hosted a reception for the Tribal Council chairman and Councils of North and South Dakota and also met with the Cheyenne River Tribal Council and the Looking Horse family which keeps the original sacred pipe of the Lakota. Hooper Dunbar, a member of the Universal House of Justice, attended. The council opened recalling a vision -Jack Wilson's vision - that Sitting Bull attempted to call for but was killed before it could come about. See also Ghost Dance and Wounded Knee Massacre.

==== Continued Trails ====
Smaller scale Trails of Light efforts continued to be carried out from the Native American Baháʼí Institute among the Navajo.

=== Desert Rose Baháʼí Institute ===
Desert Rose began in 1988 in Tucson with the four-day Desert Rose Baháʼí School initiated by Hand of the Cause William Sears and his wife, Marguerite, along with a core group of dedicated friends. When Mr. Sears died in 1992, Marguerite continued Desert Rose Baháʼí School, but, with the knowledge and encouragement of the Universal House of Justice, decided to expand the four-day school into a permanent institute.

== Baháʼí projects undertaken by country ==
=== In Chile ===
By 1994 a radio station was established in Chile to nurture and preserve the local culture by featuring local story-tellers and music recorded at station-sponsored annual indigenous music festivals.

=== In Colombia ===
It was also in 1961 that the religion was brought to the region of the Guajira department. In 1962 four new assemblies were elected -one of them all-Indian. A new organizational unit, the Institute or Training Institute, was a goal of the Nine Year Plan started in 1964 by the Universal House of Justice and Colombia's first one began to organize and operate in 1965 as part of initiatives focused on the Indian population in the La Guajira region. By winter 1965 there were many Baha'is among both the Colombian and Venezuelan Guajiros, about 1,000 on the Colombian side and 1,500 on the Venezuelan side. Another stated goal was in the realm of international cooperation - the newly developing Indian Institute of Riohacha was shared with the Venezuelans during the first Guajiro Teacher Training Institute held at Riohacha. Among the participants in this first training were: Rosalba Pimienta, Tiana Arpushana, Tomas Pimienta, Juan Artiz Pimienta, Martha Duarte Arpushana, Maria Teresa Duarte Arpushana, Carmen Pimienta Arpushana, and Martha Epiaya all of Colombia and Rogelio Hernández, José Martin Sempron, Cecilia del Carmen Iguaran, and Maria Cecilía González all of Venezuela. The next institute was held in January 1966 at which the dedication of the building was set and the building, called the Villa Rahmat, as an Institute was completed by August. After constructing the Guajiro Teaching Institute the community united in sending financial aid to Kenya, thus fulfilling that goal. By 1967 eight local assemblies were formed among the Motilones. In late 1967 into 1968 Vicente Montezuma, a Panamanian Guaymí who had previously served in the National Spiritual Assembly of the Baháʼís of Panama, pioneered to the rural areas of Colombia and promulgated the religion especially among the Choco speaking Indians. Cross border activity in La Guajira continued in 1969 with Venezuelan Guajiri Baháʼís traveling in Colombia and Colombian Guajiri Baháʼís attending activities in Venezuela. At the 1969 national convention a number of Yukon/Yukpa delegates attended. In May 1970 an all-Guajira Baháʼí conference brought together some 200 Baháʼís from the region for talks and lessons offered in Spanish and Guajira languages including a history of the religion in the region including noting 110 local assemblies being elected that year: 57 in Colombia: 53 in Venezuela, as well as the dedication of a local Baháʼí House of Worship. In 1973 Luis Montenegro, former long-term member of the National Assembly of Colombia died while climbing the mountains of the Yukpa(Yuko), or Motilon, Indians. The first of the Paez people joined the religion in 1974 due to the service of a Panamanian Baháʼí traveling in Colombia. The fifth All-Guajira Conference was held in July in Venezuela in 1977.

==== FUNDAEC ====
Against a backdrop of serious social disruption and violence across Colombia Baháʼís turned to service to the people living in the countryside. In 1974 FUNDAEC (Note: FUNDAEC is different from FUNDESCU though there are many similarities. FUNDAEC is the Colombian NGO based on Baháʼí consultations with Colombians starting in the 1970s and developed a number of projects like a secondary curriculum centered on skill development for living in the countryside and minimized urbanization for example. FUNDESCU is an older (from the 1950s) NGO in Panama based on Baháʼí consultations with Panamanian Indians and developed a system of schools serving largely remote areas. An agricultural project was attempted in the 1990s and was in fact based on cooperation between the Panamanian and Colombian NGOs but it failed from differences.) was founded by group of professors at the University of Valle. According to Gustavo Correa, director of FUNDAEC, it was originally inspired by a quotation from Baháʼu'lláh - "Baha'u'llah talks about man as 'a mine rich in gems of inestimable value.' He says that 'education can, alone, cause it to reveal its treasures, and enable mankind to benefit therefrom'.

One of the authors was Farzam Arbab and president of FUNDAEC from 1974 to 1988, would also serve in several capacities for the religion including being a member of the National Spiritual Assembly of the Baháʼís of Colombia, a Continental Counsellor, appointed to the International Teaching Centre and eventually elected to the Universal House of Justice in 1993.

FUNDAEC has instituted a number of development projects: the Centro Universitario de Bienestar Rural, the "Tutorial Learning System" or "SAT" (the Spanish acronym for "Sistema de Aprendizaje Tutorial") and a micro-finance Project. The SAT was particularly successful with cutting the process of urbanization, increases in democratic behavior and aspects of gender equality, extra curricular activities in communities, stopping migratory movement of populations, and established public-private cooperation in Colombia. By 2002 the SAT system was in use in Honduras, Guatemala, Ecuador, Venezuela, Panama, Costa Rica, Brazil, Colombia and the first phases of the implementation of the program have started in Zambia. Parallel to SAT, FUNDAEC began a micro-finance initiative as well.

==== Ruhi Institute ====
In Colombia the Ruhi Institute, a Baháʼí study circle, began as an initiative of the community with a commitment starting in 1970. About 1980 one of the Auxiliary Board members in Colombia entered into a process of consultation with several rural communities around the town of Puerto Tejada in order to help them identify steps they could take to improve their own social conditions. An early aim was to establish nurseries and kindergartens. In 1983 it published its first course Principles and Beliefs, Course 1: Life and Death. The courses developed as a "Core Activities Initiative". In 1987 the institute wrote its first course book on the education of children. In 1988 the national assembly decided to seek legal recognition for the Ruhi Institute by incorporating it as an organization with its own Board of Directors appointed by the assembly. It dedicates its efforts to the development of human resources for the spiritual, social, and cultural development of the Colombian people. Although its center is in the town of Puerto Tejada in the department of Cauca, its area of influence extends throughout the entire country. Especially in recent years, its educational programs have been adopted by an increasing number of agencies worldwide.

If individuals developed interests in contributing to society beyond those of the formal Ruhi courses they were introduced to the opportunities provided by FUNDAEC.

=== In Bolivia ===
The first Indian of Bolivia formally joined the religion in 1956 which soon spread widely among that subculture. The election of the Bolivian national assembly in 1961 - representative of a community the majority of whom were of the Aymara people - were (in alphabetical order by last name): Estanislao Alverez, recording secretary, Athas Costas, Sabino Ortega (first Indian teacher), Andres Jachakovo (this first Indian adherent in Bolivia), vice-chairman, Yolanda de Lopez, secretary, Daniel Mauricio (founder of first Baha'i school), Massoud Khamsi, chairman, Alberto Saldias, treasurer, and Alberto Rocabado. By 1963 there were hundreds of local assemblies. Andres was appointed as an Auxiliary Board member in 1969 after serving on the national assembly since 1961 and often living for periods of times in different Indian communities. After the 1960s the focus on service through socio-economic development began to work in a context of sustainable growth of the religion - many projects were developed including the 'Yachay Wasi' Baháʼí Tutorial Center which was to train the teachers for one hundred tutorial schools to be established in the country, a Baháʼí radio station with indigenous support staffing following developments in Ecuador - its call letters are CP-220 - and Nur University. The Baháʼí Faith is currently the largest international religious minority in Bolivia. The largest population of Baháʼís in South America is in Bolivia, a country whose general population is estimated to be 55%-70% indigenous and 30%-42% Mestizo, with a Baháʼí population estimated at 217000 in 2005 according to the Association of Religion Data Archives.

=== In Costa Rica ===
The national assembly of Costa Rica sponsored a four-day Indian school in Amubre, Talamanc near the Sixaola River. In 1966 construction began on a new teaching institute on the Baháʼí endowment property in Alajuela and also in 1966 the community raised the number of assemblies from fourteen to twenty. A beautification project in 1984 was held in Guanacaste province inspired by the Baháʼí gardens on Mt. Carmel as well as reading prayers - thirty people joined the religion during the project. There was also a chance to record some Bribri chanted prayers which would be broadcast on the radio.

=== In Panama ===
A Baháʼí Radio station on AM broadcasting from Boca del Monte with programs and news in Guaymí native language, Ngabere, leading to maintaining the usefulness of the language and in the telling of stories and coverage of issues to the support of Guaymí traditions and culture.

In Panama's remote indigenous villages Baháʼí volunteers run ten primary schools where the government does not provide access to a school. Later a FUNDESCU (Note: FUNDESCU is different from FUNDAEC though there are many similarities. FUNDAEC is the Colombian NGO based on Baháʼí consultations with Colombians starting in the 1970s and developed a number of projects like a secondary curriculum centered on skill development for living in the countryside and minimizedurbanization for example. FUNDESCU is an older (from the 1950s) NGO in Panama based on Baháʼí consultations with Panamanian Indians and developed a system of schools serving largely remote areas. An agricultural project was attempted in the 1990s and was in fact based on cooperation between the Panamanian and Colombian NGOs but it failed from differences.) stipend of $50 per month was made available for 13 teachers and the Ministry of Education added funds for a 14th. As subsistence farmers, the villagers have no money or food to offer. Instead they take turns providing firewood for an outdoor kitchen or build small wood-framed shelters with corrugated zinc panels and a narrow wooden platform for a bed. The teachers and administrators do not seek to convert the students. Some of the villagers are Baháʼís, some are Catholics, some Evangelicals, and some follow the native Mama Tata religion. In all, about half the students are Baháʼís (about 150). Nevertheless, there is a strong moral component to the program including a weekly class on "Virtues and Values." Over the years, some training for the teachers has been provided but many have not finished the twelfth grade including some women who have faced difficulties getting even that much education.

Among the formal schools established there are:

- In the Panamá district the Baháʼís established a Baháʼí inspired school in San Miguelito, a city with widespread poverty, and a native population of Embera and Kuna peoples.
- Baháʼí Elementary of Soloy which was in process of registration with the Ministry of Education as of 2007.
- The Badí School was founded in 1993 and began as a kindergarten with 12 students. In 2007 there were 290 students serving K-12, with a waiting list of 1,500, and six of the first seven graduates earned the highest grade on the Panama University entrance exam and were accepted with full four-year scholarships. Badí School also developed a two-story community library, and added a classroom and computer lab in 2006.
- Molejon High School which was registered with the Ministry of Education in March 2007.
- Soloy Community Technology & Learning Center
- Ngöbe-Buglé Universidad which began having classes and was processing accreditation with the University of Panama in 2006.

== Prominent Native American Baháʼís in North America ==
Jacqueline Left Hand Bull was elected as Chair of the National Spiritual Assembly of the Baháʼís of the United States, for the first time, in 2007. She was the first American Indian woman to so serve, and the third woman to do so since its formation in 1925. She served as Chair through 2011. Other Indians had been elected to the institution - MacArthur Fellow Patricia Locke, Lakota hoop dancer and flutist Kevin Locke, and Navajo artists and brothers Franklin and Chester Kahn.

Phil Lucas was a prominent Baháʼí Indian documentarian, and Nipo T. Strongheart worked as a technical advisor and performance-lecturer before joining the religion before February 1963.

Deloria Bighorn was elected to the National Spiritual Assembly of the Baháʼís of Canada in 2009, and has served as the chair of that institution since 2012.

== See also ==
- Baháʼí Faith by country
- Baháʼí radio and Socioeconomic development and the Baháʼí Faith
- Legend of the Rainbow Warriors
- Rainbow Gathering
- Native American religion
- Mormonism and Native Americans
