= Baháʼí Faith in Colombia =

The Baháʼí Faith in Colombia begins with references to the country in Baháʼí literature as early as 1916, with Baháʼís visiting as early as 1927. The first Colombian joined the religion in 1929 and the first Baháʼí Local Spiritual Assembly was elected in Bogotá in 1944 with the beginning of the arrival of coordinated pioneers from the United States and achieved an independent National Spiritual Assembly in 1961. By 1963 there were eleven local assemblies. In the 1980s institutions were developed in Colombia that have influenced activities inside and independent of the religion in other countries: FUNDAEC and the Ruhi Institute. The Association of Religion Data Archives (relying mostly on the World Christian Encyclopedia) estimated some 70,000 Baháʼís (0.2% of the population) in 2005, and about the same in 2010.

== ʻAbdu'l-Bahá's Tablets of the Divine Plan ==
ʻAbdu'l-Bahá, the son of the founder of the religion, wrote a series of letters, or tablets, to the followers of the religion in the United States in 1916–1917; these letters were compiled together in the book titled Tablets of the Divine Plan. The sixth of the tablets was the first to mention Latin American regions and was written on April 8, 1916, but was delayed in being presented in the United States until 1919 — after the end of World War I and the Spanish flu. The sixth tablet was translated and presented by Mirza Ahmad Sohrab on April 4, 1919, and published in Star of the West magazine on December 12, 1919.

"His Holiness Christ says: Travel ye to the East and to the West of the world and summon the people to the Kingdom of God. ... the republic of Mexico...to be familiar with the Spanish language...Guatemala, Honduras, Salvador, Nicaragua, Costa Rica, Panama and the seventh country Belize...Attach great importance to the indigenous population of America...Likewise the islands of ...Cuba, Haiti, Puerto Rico, Jamaica, ... Bahama Islands, even the small Watling Island...Haiti and Santo Domingo...the islands of Bermuda... the republics of the continent of South America—Colombia, Ecuador, Peru, Brazil, The Guianas, Bolivia, Chile, Argentina, Uruguay, Paraguay, Venezuela; also the islands to the north, east and west of South America, such as Falkland Islands, the Galapagòs, Juan Fernandez, Tobago and Trinidad...."

Following the release of these tablets and then ʻAbdu'l-Bahá's death in 1921, a few Baháʼís began moving to or at least visiting Latin America. In 1927 Leonora Armstrong was the first Baháʼí to visit and give lectures about the religion in Colombia as part of her plan to complement and complete Martha Root's unfulfilled intention of visiting all the Latin American countries for the purpose of presenting the religion to an audience. Aura Sanchez of Bogotá is credited as the first Colombian Baháʼí. She joined the religion in 1929 after hearing of the religion from an American who was in that country.

== Early phase ==
Shoghi Effendi, who was named ʻAbdu'l-Bahá's successor, wrote a cable on May 1, 1936, to the Baháʼí Annual Convention of the United States and Canada, and asked for the systematic implementation of ʻAbdu'l-Bahá's vision to begin. In his cable he wrote:

"Appeal to assembled delegates ponder historic appeal voiced by ʻAbdu'l-Bahá in Tablets of the Divine Plan. Urge earnest deliberation with incoming National Assembly to insure its complete fulfillment. First century of Baháʼí Era drawing to a close. Humanity entering outer fringes most perilous stage its existence. Opportunities of present hour unimaginably precious. Would to God every State within American Republic and every Republic in American continent might ere termination of this glorious century embrace the light of the Faith of Baháʼu'lláh and establish structural basis of His World Order."

Following the May 1st cable, another cable from Shoghi Effendi came on May 19 calling for permanent pioneers to be established in all the countries of Latin America. The Baháʼí National Spiritual Assembly of the United States and Canada was appointed the Inter-America Committee to take charge of the preparations. During the 1937 Baháʼí North American Convention, Shoghi Effendi cabled advising the convention to prolong their deliberations to permit the delegates and the National Assembly to consult on a plan that would enable Baháʼís to go to Latin America as well as to include the completion of the outer structure of the Baháʼí House of Worship in Wilmette, Illinois. In 1937 the First Seven Year Plan (1937–44), which was an international plan designed by Shoghi Effendi, gave the American Baháʼís the goal of establishing the Baháʼí Faith in every country in Latin America. With the spread of American Baháʼís in Latin American, Baháʼí communities and Local Spiritual Assemblies began to form in 1938 across Latin America.

The permanent Colombian Baháʼí community dates from the arrival of Gerard Sluter in 1940. The next pioneer to arrive was Ruth Shoock who arrived in November–December 1942. followed closely by Winifred Louise Baker in later January 1943. Carlos Nieto is credited with being the first to declare his faith in Baháʼu'lláh - he was from Barranquilla.

Dorothy Beecher Baker, later a Hand of the Cause, had a daughter, Winifred Louise Baker, who pioneered to Colombia in January 1943. Later in 1943 Dorothy spent a month in Colombia visiting the Baháʼís and her daughter. By January 1944 there were six Colombians that accepted and enrolled as Baháʼís. and they helped elect the first Baháʼí Local Spiritual Assembly which was in Bogotá that January. In 1943 during the annual Baháʼí convention of the United States, Shoghi Effendi announced a Northern-and Southern- international convention which would include representatives from each state and province from the United States and Canada and each republic of Latin America. This 1944 centenary of the religion's All-America Convention's Colombian delegate was Josephina Rodriquez. By September there were 25 Baháʼís in Bogotá with about an equal number studying the religion actively. By June 1945 a campaign of letter exchanges had raised an assembly in Mogotes and there were enrolled Baháʼís among people at a leper colony at Contratacion and individuals in Cartagena and Medellín and interested responses from several other cities. Around October 1946 Gayle Woolson took an extended trip through several towns of Colombia including Cali, Medellín, Cartagena and Barranquilla as well as some towns in Ecuador.

== Growth ==
As 1947 opened assemblies were added in Cali, Medellín, Cartagena and Contratacion. Gayle Woolson was again touring several cities of Colombia - Medellín, Cartagena, Barranquilla, Bucaramanga and Mogotes. The members of the Medellín assembly were Francisco Onego R., Bernarda Yepes, Margarita Caicedo, Hernando Jaramillo A., William Gomez M., Dario Echavarria, John Carder, Augusto Mora, Jose Ramos. By July 1947 a regional committee for South America Central American was organizing developments across the continent. Retrospectively a stated purpose for the committee was to facilitate a shift in the balance of roles from North American guidance and Latin cooperation to Latin guidance and North American cooperation. The process was well underway by 1950 and was to be enforced about 1953. Meanwhile, a regional committee oversaw Colombian activities headed by Dr. Saul Hernández out of Bogotá and Woolson's travels were covered by newspaper and radio press.

The second South American Baháʼí Congress was celebrated in Santiago, Chile, in January, 1948. Though Colombia had had more new assemblies form, it was too remote for general logistics. Colombia focused its efforts on welcoming Baháʼís who attended the Pan-American Conference instead. In October 1949 Colombia hosted a conference for Colombian, Ecuadoran and Venezuelan Baháʼís on the progress of the religion in their areas; however, all the participants save two teachers came from the Colombian cities of Bogotá, Barranquilla, Cali and Medellín. Then came the prospect of decision making coming from the Latino communities and North Americans supporting their choices. Assemblies across South America failed to reform on their own but several were able to be "activated" during 1950–1. Pioneers listed for Colombia in 1950 were Gayle Woolson, Elise Schreiber, and Dorothy Campbell. In 1950, the South American Baháʼís formed a regional Spiritual Assembly for South America whose first members were Edmund Miessler of Brazil, Margot Worley of Brazil, Eve Nicklin of Peru, Gayle Woolson of Colombia, Esteban Canales of Paraguay, Mercedes Sanchez of Peru, Dr. Alexander Reid of Chile, Rangvald Taetz of Uruguay, and Manuel Vera of Peru. Of the 25 delegates for the 1951 election, 4 were from Colombia.

Developing communities of Baháʼís by the early 1960s

From 1951 youth groups were being organized for Baháʼís in Barranquilla and Cali. In November 1953 pioneers listed for Colombia were Meredith W. Smith and Elton M. Smith, In 1954 Gayle Woolson and in 1955 Katherine McLaughlin was touring Colombia and nearby countries. Mr. and Mrs. Donald Barrett arrived in Bogota, Colombia, in January, 1955. In 1956 Woolson went on pilgrimage and toured sharing her experience and the national center of Colombia was dedicated.

The next restructuring of the regional assembly came in 1957 when it was split into two - basically northern/eastern South America with the Republics of Brazil, Peru, Colombia, Ecuador, and Venezuela, in Lima, Peru and one of the western/southern South America with the Republics of Argentina, Chile, Uruguay, Paraguay, and Bolivia in Buenos Aires, Argentina. The convention for northern/eastern Baháʼís was witnessed by Horace Holley as the representative of Shoghi Effendi. A small book on the Buddha was produced in 1957 by the national assembly. The Colombian Baháʼí community held its first summer school during a national conference in Medellín in January 1958. In 1960 the first assemblies were elected at Manizales, Pereira, and Cartagena. The Baháʼís of Cali hosted the 4th convention of the regional assembly. In 1960 a three-day conference of the World Association of World Federalists was held in Germany and was attended by Colombian delegates and Baháʼís associated with the Baháʼí International Community. A Colombian delegate responded positively to the suggestion of a relationship between spirituality and the World Federalist Movement.

There were 19 delegates to the convention to elect the first National Spiritual Assembly of the Baháʼís of Colombia in 1961. The election was witnessed by Hand of the Cause Shuʼáʼu'lláh ʻAláʼí who made a public address to at the Museum of Colonial Art before the convention. Its first members were: Charles Hornby, A.K. Kalantar, Luis Montenegro, Ervin L. Thomas, Leonor Porras, Jamshid Meghnot, Marjorie Weddell, Habib Rezvani, and Gloria de Fritzsche. Events and the election were covered by Revista Semana of the May 15, 1961 issue in a full-page article. In short order the national assembly began publishing its Noticias Baháʼís de Colombia as its official publication. The March–April 1961 issue of Cronicos-Israel y America Latina, published in Colombia, carried an article on the religion. It was also in 1961 that the religion was brought to the region of the Guajira department. In 1962 four new assemblies were elected -one of them all-Indian and the national assembly was legally incorporated as well.

In 1963 the members of the national assemblies of the world were the delegates to elect the first Universal House of Justice. The Colombian members of the national assembly that year were: Gloria de Fritzsche, Charles Homby, Louis Montenegro, Leonor Porras, Habib Rezvani, Ellen Sims, Ervin Thomas, Wilma Thomas, Stewart M. Waddell; all of whom were able to attend the international convention together. In 1963 there were Local Spiritual Assemblies in: Barranquilla, Bogotá, Bucaramanga, Cali, Cartagena, one for the region of Southeast Guajira, Leticia (Amazonas), Manizales, Medellín, Pereira, and Riohacha with smaller groups of Baháʼís in Dibulla and Ibagué, and isolated Baháʼís in Maicao and Palmira and among it were members of the Wayuu in the La Guajira Department.

== Nine Year Plan and the organization of Colombian Baháʼís ==
The Baháʼís of Colombia were given 10 goals for the Nine Year Plan designated by the Universal House of Justice which started in 1964 and Colombia was singled out as having succeeded in its goals so early that several goals were raised in response. The goals included developing school programs. The 1964 summer school was held in November and covered subjects of newly translated The Dawn-Breakers and The Thief in the Night, a book by Hand of the Cause William Sears and various Baháʼí teachings and administration. There was also a separate convention/camp for children. A new organizational unit, the Institute or Training Institute, was another goal and Colombia's first one began to organize and operate in 1965 as part of initiatives focused on the Indian population in the La Guajira region. There were also several series of progressive institute courses used among the Baháʼís. A regional conference on the progress of the religion in the region was called by the Hands of the Cause in the western hemisphere in the summer of 1965 at the Bogotá national center along with representatives of the national assembly of Ecuador, Colombia and of the communities of Bogota, Barranquilla, Bucaramanga, Cali, Manizalez, Pereira, Ibagué, and Ciénaga de Oro. By winter 1965 there were many Baha'is among both the Colombian and Venezuelan Guajiros, about 1,000 on the Colombian side and 1,500 on the Venezuelan side. Another stated goal was in the realm of international cooperation - the newly developing Indian Institute of Riohacha was shared with the Venezuelans during the first Guajiro Teacher Training Institute held at Riohacha. Among the participants in this first training were: Rosalba Pimienta, Tiana Arpushana, Tomas Pimienta, Juan Artiz Pimienta, Martha Duarte Arpushana, Maria Teresa Duarte Arpushana, Carmen Pimienta Arpushana, and Martha Epiaya all of Colombia and Rogelio Hernández, José Martin Sempron, Cecilia del Carmen Iguaran, and Maria Cecilía González all of Venezuela. The next institute was held in January 1966 at which the dedication of the building was set and the building, called the Villa Rahmat, as an Institute was completed by August. After constructing the Guajiro Teaching Institute the community united in sending financial aid to Kenya, thus fulfilling that goal. Further to supporting international cooperation among Baháʼí communities the three national assemblies of Brazil, Colombia and Peru joined forces in 1965-66 and sent material resources and traveling teachers for the development of the religion in the elevated Amazon area and Colombia in particular sent pioneers beyond its national borders. First contact with the Archipelago of San Andrés, Providencia and Santa Catalina for the Baháʼís came in 1966 when Helen Hornby and her husband pioneered there. By 1967 there was an election of a local assembly in San Andrés, with a community of nearly one hundred members and sixty-four on Providencia and across Colombia the goal of Baháʼís living in 100 localities was more than doubled and one locality has been established in each of (then) sixteen departments and other civic divisions. By 1967 eight local assemblies were formed among the Motilones. In late 1967 into 1968 Vicente Montezuma, a Panamanian Guaymí who had previously served in the National Spiritual Assembly of the Baháʼís of Panama, pioneered to the rural areas of Colombia and promulgated the religion especially among the Choco speaking Indians. Almost overlapping his trip Hand of the Cause Ruhiyyih Khanum traveled through Venezuela and Colombia from February 1968. On the evening of February 29 she arrived at the Villa Rahmat, the Guajiro Indian Institute. The next evening she showed slides of her trips to Panama, Bolivia, and Argentina Indian to about thirty Riohacha adult and children Baháʼís. Soon she traveled with local Baháʼís to the sea salt harvest sands at Manaure. From there the group went to the homeland of the Yukpa (Yuko) in the Cesar Department where she camped in a Plaintain grove. There she promulgated the religion indirectly, by being known as a Baháʼí who was interested in their craft work even among avowed Baháʼís. From there she and her group ascended into a more remote region and a machete wounded foot of a Baháʼí was tended. Later she offered that though she was raised largely in "city life" she had served an example of travel in the remote regions. From there she visited the Baháʼís in Barranquilla and Bogotá where she also gave talks. Upon reaching Bogotá several newspapers covered her work - El Espectador, carried a featured story "El Baháʼí Busca la Unidad Humana" by Margarita Vidal Garcia. While in the area she met Leonora Armstrong. Meanwhile, in May one of the first Baháʼís in San Andrés insisted on a Baháʼí funeral which in turn was covered by local radio and attended by some 500 people including civic and religious leaders and resulted in a large venue for the observance of the Baháʼí Holy Day, the Declaration of the Báb.

Cross border activity in La Guajira continued in 1969 with Venezuelan Guajiro Baháʼís traveling in Colombia and Colombian Guajiro Baháʼís attending activities in Venezuela. At the 1969 national convention a number of Yukon/Yukpa delegates attended. The October summer school was held in Cali. And a training institute was established in the Chocó region.

In May 1970 an all-Guajiro Baháʼí conference brought together some 200 Baháʼís from the region for talks and lessons offered in Spanish and Guajira languages including a history of the religion in the region including noting 110 local assemblies being elected that year: 57 in Colombia: 53 in Venezuela, as well as the dedication of a local Baháʼí House of Worship. In April Hand of the Cause Enoch Olinga took a trip through Colombia and in July a continental conference of Baháʼís was held in Bolivia at which several delegates from Colombia attended while others from Colombia worked in Brazil. In September new pioneer Baháʼís reached Santa Lucía, Atlántico - by 1971 there were over 400 Baháʼís including the mayor, three classes begun, a regional convention on the progress of the religion, and an institute were operating. In 1970 about fifteen people accounted as the active core of the community in Cali. They began what would turn into - in about two decades - the Ruhi Institute (see below.)

An informal summary of the community in 1971 showed about 1000 Baháʼís and expectations of doubling the number of assemblies among the Guajiro Baháʼís. In 1972 Guajiro Baháʼís attended the dedication of the Panamanian Baháʼí House of Worship and the Baháʼí population of Santa Lucía was reported at 1200 and had reached neighboring villages during a follow-up conference in at Manaure. In 1973 Luis Montenegro, former long-term member of the National Assembly of Colombia died while climbing the mountains of the Yukpa(Yuko), or Motilon, Indians. At the close of the Nine Year Plan changes had indeed been wrought in Colombia.

== Projects and developments, wider growth ==
In 1974 a conference was held in Cali with Baháʼís from Venezuela, Ecuador, Colombia attending and now appointed Continental Counselor Leonora Armstrong attended. A national training institute was dedicated. The first of the Paez people joined the religion in 1974 due to the service of a Panamanian Baháʼí traveling in Colombia. In 1975 Ruhiyyih Khanum returned to Colombia but this time it was on the side of the tropical forest during the Green Light Expedition recording her travel up the Amazon river and through other rivers and adjoining lands. She entered Leticia, where she was interviewed by reporters and met with a Ticuna speaking chief and then citizens of the village. By 1978 a Baháʼí center was raised in Leticia. In 1976 the first citizen of Archipiélago de San Bernardo joined the religion in 1976. Print materials were being produced in Colombia and circulated there and in Ecuador. The religion was introduced to Sogamoso. The fifth All-Guajira Conference was held in July in Venezuela. In 1977 the Brazil, Colombia and Peru Baháʼí communities formed a committee to coordinate efforts in the border regions deep in the Amazon. A 1978 institute covered the relationship between the elected and appointed aspects of Baháʼí administration for some 30 Baháʼís in Riohacha. In 1980 the Baháʼí International Community reported on projects Baháʼís communities had carried out for the International Year of the Child - the national assembly of Colombia published a compilation Educacion Espiritual de los Niños and the Amatu'l-Baha Ruhiyyih Khanum International Institute of the Amazon Region was dedicated February in Leticia. In April on the west side of Colombia and the Baháʼís of Pasto hosted the first Colombian-Ecuadorian Baháʼí Frontier Conference on the promulgation of the religion in the area with about 120 participants. Under the cooperation of the two national assemblies a commission was appointed to coordinate efforts in the area. Among the initiatives reviewed was the Ecuadorian Baháʼí Radio station whose broadcast covers some of Ecuador and Colombia. In addition to more Baháʼís the goal's included the responsibility for children's classes, women's activities, and assembly development programs and was centered from the Puerta Tejada Ruhi Institute and graduation was the act of explaining each completed course satisfactorily to at least five other Baháʼís. Attendees at the conference also reviewed the events surrounding the death of Enoch Olinga, his wife, and three of their children, as well as the life of service of Rahmatu'lláh Muhájir who had died in Ecuador the year before.

In 1982 some 1,300 Baha'is from 42 countries gathered August in Quito, the second of five such gatherings. 13 Continental Counsellors, representatives of 24 of the 29 National Spiritual Assemblies in Latin America and the Caribbean, and members of 21 Indian tribes from Bolivia, Brazil, Canada, Chile, Colombia, Ecuador, Panama, Peru, United States and Venezuela attended. The Conferences were dedicated to the memory of Bahíyyih Khánum.

The idea for a Trail of Light occurred during preparations for the first Baháʼí Native Council (see Baháʼí Faith and Native Americans) in 1978. Another inspiration for the Trail of Light was the concept of promulgating the religion among the indigenous peoples in the Pacific Rim that was described by the Hand of the Cause Rahmátu'llah Muhájir in 1978. The Trail of Light, also known as Camino del Sol, was defined as a process whereby native Baháʼís engaged with diverse native peoples about a number of issues including promulgating their religion as well as organizing councils for the people and encouraged discovery of mutual cultural links across the native peoples. The first Trail of Light traveling trip by 22 members of the religion occurred spontaneously immediately after the council. In 1985 the Trail of Light project began its work in Colombia. Among the participants were two youth from the Guaymi tribe in Panama; six members from the Guajiros, the Colombo-Venezuelan tribe, and two youth from the Paez, a tribe in southern Colombia. They first traveled to the Guajira region and re-affirmed the religion among the Baháʼís there and the group performed dances which inspired the Guajiros to offer their own dance, the Chichamaya, which had been illegal. The group was invited to the local high school where the Guaymis shared the story of the impact of the religion among their people (see Baháʼí Faith in Panama.) The group was then invited to the elementary school. From Guajira the group headed to Valledupar and then on to the homeland of the Arhuaco tribe in the Sierra Nevada de Santa Marta. There the group met with the leadership, the Mamos, or elders of the community for permission to present the message they had come to give. Various of the group presented to the Mamos including the Guaymi and their interpretation of their own prophecies. An elder shared that the Arhuaco had a similar prophecy. The Trail of Light group was allowed to make their presentations and exchanges of dances and talks followed. From there the group traveled to see the Yukpa(Yuko) tribe. With the Yuko the group was able to hold a unity feast and shared dances and stayed for three days before heading home.

Since its inception the religion has had involvement in socio-economic development beginning by giving greater freedom to women, promulgating the promotion of female education as a priority concern, and that involvement was given practical expression by creating schools, agricultural coops, and clinics. Since the 1970s the Colombian Baháʼís have developed a pair of important institutions - FUNDAEC, and the Ruhi Institute.

=== FUNDAEC ===
Against a backdrop of serious social disruption and violence across Colombia Baháʼís turned to service to the people living in the countryside. In 1974 FUNDAEC was founded by group of professors at the University of Valle. According to Gustav Correa, director of FUNDAEC, it was originally inspired by a quotation from Baháʼu'lláh - "Baha'u'llah talks about man as 'a mine rich in gems of inestimable value.' He says that 'education can, alone, cause it to reveal its treasures, and enable mankind to benefit therefrom'. In 1983 Gustavo Correa presented on the FUNDAEC project to Association for Baháʼí Studies 8th annual Conference. In 1985 an advisor of a development committee assisting the Anís Zunúzí Baháʼí School visited the FUNDAEC project in Cali to look for insights in development work.

One of the authors was Farzam Arbab and president of FUNDAEC from 1974 to 1988, would also serve in several capacities for the religion including being a member of the National Spiritual Assembly of the Baháʼís of Colombia, a Continental Counsellor, appointed to the International Teaching Centre and eventually elected to the Universal House of Justice in 1993.

FUNDAEC has instituted a number of development projects: the Centro Universitario de Bienestar Rural, the "Tutorial Learning System" or "SAT" (the Spanish acronym for "Sistema de Aprendizaje Tutorial") and a micro-finance Project. The SAT was particularly successful with cutting the process of urbanization, increases in democratic behavior and aspects of gender equality, extra curricular activities in communities, stopping migratory movement of populations, and established public-private cooperation in Colombia. By 2002 the SAT system was in use in Honduras, Guatemala, Ecuador, Venezuela, Panama, Costa Rica, Brazil, Colombia and the first phases of the implementation of the program have started in Zambia. Parallel to SAT, FUNDAEC began a micro-finance initiative as well.

=== Ruhi Institute ===
In Colombia the Ruhi Institute, a Baháʼí study circle, began as an initiative of the community with a commitment starting in 1970. In 1980 a Ruhi Institute was operating in the border area where Ecuador and Colombia meet. About 1980 one of the Auxiliary Board members in Colombia entered into a process of consultation with several rural communities around the town of Puerto Tejada in order to help them identify steps. they could take to improve their own social conditions. An early aim was to establish nurseries and kindergartens. In 1983 it published its first course Principles and Beliefs, Course 1: Life and Death. The courses developed as a "Core Activities Initiative". In 1983 there was discussion of using the Ruhi Institute process in the Dominican Republic and in Puerto Rico. In 1984 Baháʼí Counsellors and Auxiliary Board members from Colombia, the Dominican Republic, Panama, Puerto Rico and Venezuela met at the Ruhi Institute in Puerto Tejada and discussed the Ruhi Institute courses and the Ruhi courses were used in the Central African Republic. Counsellors and representatives of 17 National Spiritual Assemblies in the Caribbean basin and Latin America gathered in St. Lucia to introduce and study materials prepared at the Ruhi Institute in Colombia and Honduran Baháʼís attended the Cali Ruhi Institute with the intention of returning to Honduras as trainers in the Ruhi methods. In 1987 the institute wrote its first course book on the education of children. In 1988 the national assembly decided to seek legal recognition for the Ruhi Institute by incorporating it as an organization with its own Board of Directors appointed by the assembly. It dedicates its efforts to the development of human resources for the spiritual, social, and cultural development of the Colombian people. Although its center is in the town of Puerto Tejada in the department of Cauca, its area of influence extends throughout the entire country. Especially in recent years, its educational programs have been adopted by an increasing number of agencies worldwide.

If individuals developed interests in contributing to society beyond those of the formal Ruhi courses they were introduced to the opportunities provided by FUNDAEC.

== Recent situation ==
=== Demographics ===
In 2000 the World Christian Encyclopedia estimated some 64,000 Baháʼís in Colombia ranking it as among the top 20 Baháʼí communities of the world. The Association of Religion Data Archives (relying mostly on the World Christian Encyclopedia) estimated there were 70,512 Baháʼís (0.2% of the population) in the country in 2005, and about the same in 2010. Wolfram Alpha estimated 0.1531% of Colombians or almost 69,000 people were Baháʼís in 2010.

=== First local House of Worship ===
In 2012 the Universal House of Justice announced that it had determined that the first ever local Baháʼí Houses of Worship would be built, in five locations around the globe. One of these was specified in Cauca Department, Colombia. The design for this local House of Worship, to be situated in the Agua Azul vereda of the municipality of Villa Rica, was unveiled on 14 September 2014. The groundbreaking ceremony was held in May 2016, and the opening dedication ceremony was held in July 2018.

== See also ==
- Baháʼí Faith by country
- History of Colombia
- Religion in Colombia
- Baháʼí Faith and Native Americans
