= Barro Blanco Dam =

Dam in Chiriqui, Panama

- Computer rendition of the dam

- Location within Panama
- Location: Chiriqui Province, Panama
- Coordinates: 8°12.861′N 81°35.653′W
- Owner: GENISA S.A.

Dam and spillways
- Type of dam: Gravity, roller compacted concrete
- Height: 44.91 m (147.3 ft)
- Height (foundation): 61.09 m (200.4 ft)

Reservoir
- Surface area: 2.58 km^{2} (1.00 mi^{2})
- Normal elevation: 103 m (338 ft)

Power Station
- Hydraulic head: 42.94 m (140.9 ft)
- Turbines: 1 x 1.98 MW Francis-type, 2 x 13.14 MW Kaplan-type
- Installed capacity: 28.56 MW
- Annual generation: 124.83 GWh Est.
- Website http://www.genisa.com.pa/en/barro-blanco/

Barro Blanco is a gravity dam on the Tabasara River in the Chiriqui Province of Panama. It began generating in 2017 with capacity of 28.56 MW. Although the government had authorized the dam, it suspended construction in February 2015 after protests. The President of the Republic authorized the partial restart of construction in August 2015, but prohibited the filling of the reservoir pending a final agreement. Important issues concerning the dam are controversial, such as the question whether the indigenous communities in the area initially had expressed their support or their opposition to the dam's construction and how well they had been informed about the project and its impacts prior to expressing their views.

== Technical features ==
The dam was designed to minimize the impact on the river, never leaving any section of the river dry. The roller-compacted concrete gravity dam is to have a maximum height of 44.91 m (147.3 ft) and a maximum reservoir surface of 2.58 km^{2} (1.00 mi^{2}), including 0.69 km^{2} (0.27 mi^{2}) currently occupied by the Tabasara River and 1.89 km^{2} (0.73 mi^{2}) that would be inundated, according to the project design document submitted to the UN Clean Development Mechanism Executive Board. 0.07 km^{2} (0.027 mi^{2}) of the inundated land would be located In the indigenous territory (Comarca) of the Ngöbe–Buglé people. The installed capacity of the planned hydropower plant is 28.84 Megawatt.

== Ownership and financing ==
The project developer is Generadora del Istmo S. A. (GENISA), a Panamanian special purpose company created specifically for this project. GENISA is owned by the Kafie family: the public registry lists Luis Kafie (President), Luis Jose Kafie (Treasurer and Director), Shukri Kafie (Director), Eduardo Kafie (Director), Eduardo Kafie Atala (Director) and Christoper Kafie (Director) as member of the board of GENISA.

The project is financed by loans that have been provided by two European state-owned banks that promote private sector investments in developing countries, the German Investment Corporation (DEG) and the Netherlands Development Finance Company (FMO), as well as by the Central American Bank for Economic Integration (CABEI). CABEI approved a USD 25 million loan to the project developer in 2011. Total funding from the three banks amounts to USD 78.3 million.

== Context of the conflict ==
There is a long-standing conflict between the Ngäbe people and the government concerning mining and the construction of dams for hydropower generation in or near their territory. The Ngäbe-Buglé Comarca was created in 1997 for the use of the Ngäbe and Buglé indigenous communities. Despite this during the 1970s the Panamanian government proposed to dam the Tabasara with a 220MW hydroelectric project designed to supply energy to the proposed Colorado Copper Mines. This project was cancelled following widespread protests. They had won the first battle of the Tabasara dams, however, during the 1990s another project was proposed - this time a 48MW dam, they again successfully defeated this proposal. This thereafter resulted in the Panamanian government changing national law in order to repeal requirements related to participation from indigenous communities.

This long history of conflict regarding their traditional and spiritual lands has resulted in the prolonged social mobilisation of the Ngäbe-Buglé communities.

== Environmental and social impact ==
According to GENISA, no indigenous village or houses would be inundated by the reservoir and no one would be resettled. However 5 hectares of stream bed will be flooded during the rainy season. The land to be inundated consists of ravines close to the river that are not suitable for agriculture or livestock grazing. According to another source the area to be flooded is 1.89 km^{2} (0.73 mi^{2}), or 189 hectares. However, critics allege that the livelihoods of some 5000 Ngöbe farmers who rely on the river for potable water, agriculture and fishing will be negatively impacted, and primary forest would be cut down. They also say that the impacted communities have never provided their free, prior and informed consent to the project.

Furthermore, they say that the habitat of the endangered Tabasará rain frog would be destroyed. GENISA says that the Tabasará rain frog lives in several habitats in Panama, including in the Anton Valley hundreds of kilometers away from the site.

== Chronology ==
=== Concession award and environmental impact study (2006-2008) ===
In 2006, under the government of President Martín Torrijos, an international public tender was announced for various hydropower projects in Panama, including Barro Blanco. Among the four participating companies GENISA was selected. The Public Services Authority ASEP authorized GENISA to prepare studies and, subject to obtaining all relevant approvals, to develop the Barro Blanco project.

GENISA commissioned an Environmental Impact Study. As part of this study, in August 2007 in a public forum with the participation of local authorities, villagers close to the project were asked about their view of the dam. At the time, the indigenous M-10 Movement rejected the dam, because it considered indigenous people would lose their land, would not be able to use the river any more and because the environment would be harmed. However, most of the consulted people supported the project, because it would provide jobs, better road access and improved living standards. Some of those who were opposed to the project subsequently sold their land to the project developer. In December 2007, GENISA and representatives of the Ngobe Bugle people signed a cooperation agreement that included safeguards for the fundamental rights of the indigenous people.

In May 2008 the Panamanian Environmental Authority ANAM approved the project based on the study. In December 2008 GENISA signed a Memorandum of Understanding in which it committed itself to implement a social development plan for the indigenous communities living next to the dam, including "infrastructure, health and education programs" during the construction and during the operation of the dam.

In January 2009 a validation team consisting of the consulting firm AENOR working for the UN CDM Executive Board visited the area and confirmed "that the most relevant communities involved in the area of the project were consulted, all of them supported the project activity, and project participant (i.e. GENISA) has forecasted several social compensation measurements for the communities involved." The International Rivers Network says that the validation report by AENOR was flawed, since allegedly only the non-indigenous population had been consulted and they had failed to take into account all comments received. In 2009 the concession contract between the government and GENISA was signed.

=== Increase of capacity and controversy about impact study (2009-2010) ===
After presidential elections in early 2009, in June 2009 Ricardo Martinelli, a businessman who promised to quickly upgrade Panama's infrastructure, took office as President of Panama. In May 2009 GENISA requested a modification of the permit to increase the capacity by 52% to 28.8 Megawatt by moving the turbines to a lower elevation, without increasing the water level in the reservoir. The original environmental study and the permit referred to an installed capacity of only 19 Megawatt. In January 2010 ANAM approved the modification, and in January 2011 the concession contract was modified accordingly. As of 2010, according to the UN CDM project document, 98% of the land to be inundated was owned by GENISA.

According to critics, the environmental impact study was flawed, because impacts on biodiversity were assessed superficially and because the capacity of the plant was increased. In late 2010 the European Investment Bank withdrew funding for the dam after an investigation into human rights abuses prompted by NGO protests. In January 2011 DEG and FMO approved their loans for the project.

=== Indigenous approval despite conflict about mining (2011) ===
In February 2011, the Panamanian government proposed a new mining law that would facilitate the development of mining projects in indigenous areas, while the indigenous people had asked for a law banning mining in their territories. The proposal and the simultaneous launching of bids for a large copper mining project called Cerro Colorado triggered protests of indigenous people, including local communities from the Barro Blanco area, who blocked the Interamerican Highway for four days. The protests were violently suppressed. The conflict was temporarily ended through the San Felix agreement, signed in the village of San Felix. Construction of the dam began in February 2011.

On June 25, 2011, according to the project developer GENISA, the regional congress of the Kädriri, the local group of Ngäbe people, approved by public majority voting that the construction of the dam should continue, after having been authorized to take a decision by the General Congress of the Ngäbe-Buglé. Also in June 2011 the UN Clean Development Mechanism (CDM) Board approved the carbon finance proposal that was to generate part of the revenue stream for the project. On August 25, 2011, a Compensation and Benefits Agreement was signed between GENISA and the Board of the Regional Congress of the Kädriri.

=== International campaign and UN inspection (2012-13) ===
However, the conflict remained unresolved. The government called for a referendum on the dam, but the indigenous leader Silvia Carrera, elected as Cacica General in September 2011, initially rejected it. An international campaign was started to stop construction of the dam and international funding for it. In March 2012 Parliament passed a modified version of the mining law that prohibited mining in the indigenous territory and required the approval of the Ngöbe Buglé General Congress for any future hydroelectric projects. However, the traditional authorities of the Ngöbe criticized Silvia Carrera for having given in. They had asked for a complete ban on hydropower projects to be included in the law.

Construction had to be halted in May 2012, because the local population occupied the site. The protests were suspended while "UN inspectors" were expected to visit the area. In September 2012 an inspection team led by UNDP and consisting of representatives of the Catholic Church, the environmental agency ANAM, the electricity regulatory agency ASEP and the project developer GENISA, visited the area. The purpose of the inspection was to verify on the ground issues that had not been answered satisfactorily in the environmental impact assessment. The inspection team presented its report in December 2012, recommending a water flow simulation to understand the impact of sudden floods as well as a participatory rural appraisal. In March 2013 an indigenous protester against the dam was killed by masked assailants.

In July 2013, James Anaya, UN special rapporteur on the rights of indigenous people, visited Panama and spoke to the Ngöbe. In his report he concluded that the Ngöbe "were not properly consulted". Prior to the visit 12 local and international civil society organizations had asked Anaya to conduct a formal investigation into the human rights impacts of the dam and to call on the government to "immediately halt the dam’s construction until the threats to the rights of the indigenous Ngӓbe people affected by the project have been fully addressed".

On September 6, 2013, the United Nations released three reports on the water flow simulation, a participatory rural appraisal as well as an ecological and economic analysis conducted by two independent international experts, Gonzalo Castro de la Mata and Luis Lopez, showing that the dam had no impact on global biodiversity, but had "real and important impacts" on the indigenous populations living in the area. However, the report did not mention that any villages would be inundated. Furthermore, the experts concluded that "the local population had not been correctly consulted". They also concluded that the local population had "a rudimentary and often erroneous knowledge of the project, being a product of rumors, often without foundation". Together with the insufficient consultation this had created a climate of fear.

=== Complaints and suspension of works (2014-2016) ===
In April 2014 Silvia Carrera, the Cacica General of the Comarca Ngäbe-Buglé, submitted a complaint to the Independent External Panels of DEG and FMO. In May 2015 the joint review of the panels found that the banks had failed to fully comply with the standards to which they had committed themselves. While the banks took significant steps to understand the situation as part of their due diligence process, they accepted an indigenous peoples report that was insufficient for the purpose to approve the credit in January 2011, requiring further investigations as a condition for disbursement, while their own standards would have required a fully satisfactory report at the time of approval. The two banks accepted the conclusions and committed themselves to "further raise the bar on the required level of information on stakeholder consultation available to (them) at the time of credit approval." In the meantime, the government of Panama - since June 2014 led by a new President, Juan Carlos Varela - suspended the construction of the dam in February 2015 on the grounds that the environmental and social impact assessment was faulty pending the outcome of a court case that challenges the assessment. In June 2015 new protests erupted, with protesters shutting down the Interamerican Highway for two days, as a result of which the President sent a riot squad to the area. On August 10, 2015, President Varela and the Cacica General of the indigenous Comarca, Silvia Carrera, signed an agreement to the effect that the civil works of the dam would be completed, but that the electromechanical works would remain suspended and the dam would not be flooded until a final agreement had been reached. GENISA complained that it had been left out of the agreement and that the agreement violated the agreements concluded by the state with the company. In September 2015 the environmental agency ANAM imposed a 775,200 USD fine on GEMISA for having failed to comply with the resettlement and compensation measures under the project. On January 21, 2016, the indigenous movement 10 April claimed that the agreement had been violated, because tests to fill the reservoir had been made. On January 28, 2016, a technical report was presented to the indigenous communities, showing that the dam was technically safe. Furthermore, a sub-commission consisting of the government and traditional authorities was created to further study the impacts of the project in view of a "final decision". Filling of the reservoir began on May 24, leading to further protests and road blocks. In response, Vice-President and Minister of Foreign Affairs Isabel Saint Malo de Alvarado held talks with indigenous leaders early June 2016. Carrera said that the filling "was a violation of the rights of indigenous people in the area, and of the contract signed by President Juan Carlos Varela." On August 22, 2016, Silva Carrera and President Varela signed another agreement. This agreement was voted down by the Ngäbe-Bugle General Congress in September 2016. The UN Clean Development Mechanism deregistered the dam in October 2016.

=== Commissioning (2017) ===
In December 2016 the Supreme Court, whose decisions cannot be appealed, ruled against two legal actions by indigenous communities. In March 2017 the General Administrator of the National Authority for Public Services declared that the Ngäbe-Bugle General Congress never presented a formal rejection document to the government, meaning dam operations could begin. In the meantime, 11 houses and fields had been flooded by the rising waters of the reservoir. Shortly after the declaration, the hydropower plant began its operation. In August 2017 three indigenous leaders who had been accused of causing damages to GENISA through their protests were acquitted by a court.

== See also ==
- List of power stations in Panama
