= Baháʼí Faith in Panama =

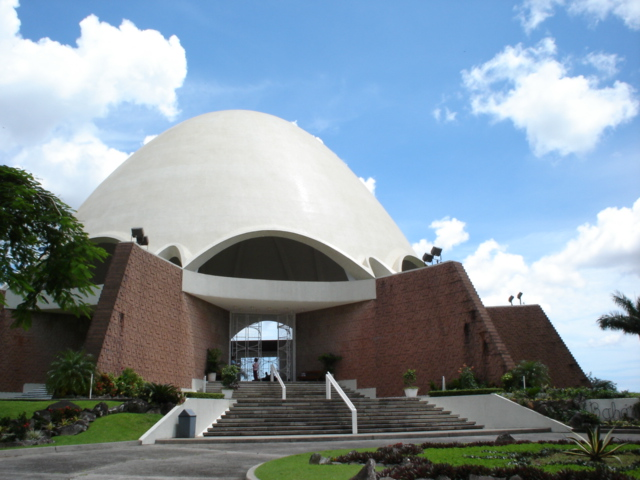
Baháʼí House of Worship, Panama City, Panama

The history of the Baháʼí Faith in Panama begins with a mention by ʻAbdu'l-Bahá, then head of the Baháʼí Faith, in the book Tablets of the Divine Plan, published in 1919; the same year, Martha Root made a trip around South America and included Panama on the return leg of the trip up the west coast. The first pioneers began to settle in Panama in 1940. The first Baháʼí Local Spiritual Assembly of Panama, in Panama City, was elected in 1946, and the National Spiritual Assembly was first elected in 1961. The Baháʼís of Panama raised a Baháʼí House of Worship in 1972. In 1983 and again in 1992, some commemorative stamps were produced in Panama while the community turned its interests to the San Miguelito and Chiriquí regions of Panama with schools and a radio station. The Association of Religion Data Archives estimated there were some 41,000 Baháʼís in 2005 while another source places it closer to 60,000.

== Reference in ʻAbdu'l-Bahá's Tablets of the Divine Plan ==
ʻAbdu'l-Bahá, the son of the founder of the religion, wrote a series of letters, or tablets, to the followers of the religion in the United States in 1916–1917; these letters were compiled together in the book Tablets of the Divine Plan. The sixth of the tablets was the first to mention Latin American regions and was written on April 8, 1916, but was delayed in being presented in the United States until 1919—after the end of the First World War and the Spanish flu. The sixth tablet was translated and presented by Mirza Ahmad Sohrab on April 4, 1919, and published in Star of the West magazine on December 12, 1919. After mentioning the need for the message of the religion to visit the Latin American countries ʻAbdu'l-Bahá continues:

All the above countries have importance, but especially the Republic of Panama, wherein the Atlantic and the Pacific Oceans come together through the Panama Canal. It is a center for travel and passage from America to other continents of the world, and in the future it will gain most great importance.....

Martha Root's first trip was from July to November 1919, and included Panama on the return leg of the trip up the west coast of South America.

Following the Tablets and about the time of ʻAbdu'l-Bahá's passing in 1921, a few other Baháʼís began moving to, or at least visiting, Latin America.

== Early phase ==
Shoghi Effendi, head of the religion after the death of ʻAbdu'l-Bahá, wrote a cable on May 1, 1936, to the Baháʼí Annual Convention of the United States and Canada, and asked for the systematic implementation of ʻAbdu'l-Bahá's vision to begin. In his cable he wrote:

Appeal to assembled delegates ponder historic appeal voiced by ʻAbdu'l-Bahá in Tablets of the Divine Plan. Urge earnest deliberation with incoming National Assembly to insure its complete fulfillment. First century of Baháʼí Era drawing to a close. Humanity entering outer fringes most perilous stage its existence. Opportunities of present hour unimaginably precious. Would to God every State within American Republic and every Republic in American continent might ere termination of this glorious century embrace the light of the Faith of Baháʼu'lláh and establish structural basis of His World Order.

Following the May 1 cable, another cable from Shoghi Effendi came on May 19 calling for permanent pioneers to be established in all the countries of Latin America. The Baháʼí National Spiritual Assembly of the United States and Canada appointed the Inter-America Committee to take charge of the preparations. During the 1937 Baháʼí North American Convention, Shoghi Effendi cabled advising the convention to prolong their deliberations to permit the delegates and the National Assembly to consult on a plan that would enable Baháʼís to go to Latin America as well as to include the completion of the outer structure of the Baháʼí House of Worship in Wilmette, Illinois. In 1937 the First Seven Year Plan (1937–44), which was an international plan designed by Shoghi Effendi, gave the American Baháʼís the goal of establishing the Baháʼí Faith in every country in Latin America. With the spread of American Baháʼís in Latin American, Baháʼí communities and Local Spiritual Assemblies began to form in 1938 across the rest of Latin America.

It was in 1939-1940 when the first pioneers began to settle in Panama. The first Local Spiritual Assembly of Panama, in Panama City, was elected in 1946, and helped host the first All-American Teaching Conference. One Baháʼí from this early period was Mabel Adelle Sneider (converted in 1946), who was a nurse at Gorgas Hospital for 30 years and then pioneered to the Gilbert Islands for many years. In 1946, American Baha'i Alfred Osborne converted the first indigenous believer, a Guna from Playa Chico.

In January 1947 Panama City hosted the first congress of the northern Latin Americas to build a new consciousness of unity among the Baháʼís of Central America, Mexico and the West Indies to focus energies for the election of a regional national assembly. Its members were Josi Antonio Bonilla, Marcia Steward, Natalia Chávez, Gerardo Vega, and Oscar Castro. Retrospectively a stated purpose for the committee was to facilitate a shift in the balance of roles from North American guidance and Latin cooperation to Latin guidance and North American cooperation. The process was well underway by 1950 and was to be enforced about 1953.

Shoghi Effendi then called for two international conventions to be held at April 1951; one was held in Panama City for the purpose of electing a regional National Spiritual Assembly over the Central area of Mexico and the West Indies whose headquarters was in Panama and which was witnessed by representatives of the National Spiritual Assembly of the Baháʼís of the United States in the persons of Dorothy Beecher Baker and Horace Holly. Circa 1953, Baháʼí Local Assemblies in Panama City and Colón had a community center.

One notable Baháʼí from this early phase was Cecilia King Blake, who on October 20, 1957, converted to the Baháʼí Faith and pioneered to Nicaragua and Costa Rica.

== Development ==
Ruth (née Yancey) and Alan Pringle had the first Baháʼí wedding to be legally recognised in Panama, and both were members of the National Spiritual Assembly that formed in 1961. Ruth served in several other positions, ultimately becoming a Continental Counsellor. The members of the 1963 National Spiritual Assembly of Panama were Harry Haye Anderson, Rachelle Jean E de Constante, James Vassal Facey, Kenneth Frederics, Leota E. M. Lockman, Alfred E. A. Osborne, William Alan H. Pringle, Ruth E. Yancey Pringle and Donald Ross Witzel. By 1963 there were Baháʼí converts among the Cerrobolo, Guaymí and Guna.

Six conferences held in October 1967 around the world presented a viewing of a copy of the photograph of Baháʼu'lláh on the highly significant occasion commemorating the centenary of Baháʼu'lláh's writing of the Suriy-i-Mulúk (Tablet to the Kings), which Shoghi Effendi describes as "the most momentous Tablet revealed by Baháʼu'lláh". After a meeting in Edirne (Adrianople), Turkey, the Hands of the Cause travelled to the conferences, 'each bearing the precious trust of a photograph of the Blessed Beauty, which it will be the privilege of those attending the Conferences to view.' Hand of the Cause Ruhiyyih Khanum conveyed this photograph to the Conference for Latin America at Panama. During this event the foundation stone of the forthcoming Baháʼí House of Worship for Latin America was laid.

== Modern community ==
Since its inception the religion has had involvement in socio-economic development beginning by giving greater freedom to women, promulgating the promotion of female education as a priority concern, and that involvement was given practical expression by creating schools, agricultural coops, and clinics. The Baháʼís of Panama were chosen as one of the sites of the Baháʼí Houses of Worship. The religion entered a new phase of activity around the world when a message of the Universal House of Justice dated 20 October 1983 was released. Baháʼís were urged to seek out ways, compatible with the Baháʼí teachings, in which they could become involved in the social and economic development of the communities in which they lived. Worldwide in 1979 there were 129 officially recognized Baháʼí socio-economic development projects. By 1987, the number of officially recognized development projects had increased to 1482. Baháʼís in Panama have embarked on a number of projects. The Panamanian government noted the activities of the Baháʼís and released a variety of philately products starting in 1983 and again in 1992 - a stamp and several stationaries and Panamanian Baháʼís became active in a number of issues among the poor regions of Panama - notably Panamá and Chiriquí/Ngöbe-Buglé districts as well as among indigenous peoples.

=== Baháʼí House of Worship ===
The Baháʼí temple in Panama City was dedicated in 1972 with Hands of the Cause Ruhiyyih Khanum, Ugo Giachery and Dhikru'llah Khadem representing the Universal House of Justice, head of the religion after the death of Shoghi Effendi. It serves as the mother temple of Latin America. It is perched on a high hill, la montaña del Dulce Canto ("the mountain of Beautiful Singing"), overlooking the city, and is constructed of local stone laid in a pattern reminiscent of Native American fabric designs. Readings in Spanish and English are available for visitors. However the mountain is being denuded by the extraction of rocks and soil to be used in the other construction.

=== Efforts among the Guaymí ===
The first Guaymí Baháʼí dates back into the 1960s, and since the 1980s there have been several projects started and evolving in those communities. After the religion grew among the Guaymi, they in turn offered service in 1985–6 with the "Camino del Sol" project included indigenous Guaymí Baháʼís of Panama traveling with the Venezuelan indigenous Carib speaking and Guajira Baháʼís through the Venezuelan states of Bolívar, Amazonas and Zulia sharing their religion. The Baháʼí Guaymí Cultural Centre was built in the Chiriquí district (which was split in 1997 to create the Ngöbe-Buglé district) and used as a seat for the Panamanian Ministry of Education's literacy efforts in the 1980s. A two-day seminar on literacy was held by the Baháʼí Community in collaboration with the Panamanian Ministry of Education in Panama City over two days beginning on April 23, 1990. The Baháʼís were specifically asked to speak on "spiritual qualities" and on "Universal Elements Essential in Education." The Minister of Education requested that the Baháʼís present their literacy projects to the Ministry of Education, in support of International Literacy Year - 1990. The Baháʼís developed many formal and village schools throughout the region and a community radio project.

==== Baháʼí Radio ====
The Baháʼí Radio is an AM broadcasting station from Boca del Monte with programs and news in Guaymí native language, Ngabere, leading to maintaining the usefulness of the language and in the telling of stories and coverage of issues to the support of Guaymí traditions and culture.

==== Schools ====
In Panama's remote indigenous villages (some requiring three hours by bus, three hours by boat, and then three hours on foot, a trip made twice a week) Baháʼí volunteers run ten primary schools where the government does not provide access to a school. Later a FUNDESCU stipend of $50 per month was made available for 13 teachers and the Ministry of Education added funds for a 14th. As subsistence farmers, the villagers have no money or food to offer. Instead they take turns providing firewood for an outdoor kitchen or build small wood-framed shelters with corrugated zinc panels and a narrow wooden platform for a bed. The teachers and administrators do not seek to convert the students. Some of the villagers are Baháʼís, some are Catholics, some Evangelicals, and some follow the native Mama Tata religion. In all, about half the students are Baháʼís (about 150). Nevertheless, there is a strong moral component to the program including a weekly class on "Virtues and Values." Over the years, some training for the teachers has been provided but many have not finished the twelfth grade including some women who have faced difficulties getting even that much education.

Among the formal schools established there are:

- Baháʼí Elementary of Soloy which was in process of registration with the Ministry of Education as of 2007.
- Molejon High School which was registered with the Ministry of Education in March 2007.
- Soloy Community Technology & Learning Center
- Ngöbe-Buglé Universidad which began having classes and was processing accreditation with the University of Panama in 2006.

=== Efforts among the Guna and Emberá ===
In the Panamá Province the Baháʼís established a Baháʼí inspired school in San Miguelito, a city with widespread poverty, and a native population of Embera and Guna peoples.

==== K-12 School ====
The Badí School was founded in 1993 and began as a kindergarten with 12 students. In 2007 there were 290 students serving K-12, with a waiting list of 1,500, and six of the first seven graduates earned the highest grade on the Panama University entrance exam and were accepted with full four-year scholarships. Badí School also developed a two-story community library, and added a classroom and computer lab in 2006.

==== University program development ====
Badi School is attempting to extend its services with college-level degrees. Some level of registration was completed in June 2007. Further accreditation is being sought as a university program in 2008 but already has had students taking college work, among them commercial artist Jessica Mizrachi Diaz.

== Demographics ==
The World Council of Churches estimates the Baháʼí population at 2.00%, or about 60,000 in 2006. The Association of Religion Data Archives estimated there were some 41000 Baháʼís in 2005. It is the largest religious minority in Panama. There is an estimate of some 8,000 Guaymi Baháʼís, about 10% of the population of Guaymi in Panama.

== See also ==
- Baháʼí Faith by country
- Baháʼí Faith and Native Americans
- Religion in Panama
- History of Panama
