= Noncomala =

Noncomala was the main and creative deity of the Ngäbe of the Ngöbe-Buglé Comarca in Panama. He formed the earth and the waters, but they were in darkness and clouds. Wading into the river, he met the water-sprite Rutbe, who bore him twins, the sun and moon.

In the Guaymis flood myth, Noncomala, angered with the world, poured over it a flood of water, killing every man and woman, but that the good god Nubu preserved the "seed" of a man, and when the waters had dried up he sowed it in the earth. From the best of the seeds came a new race of men, and from that which was imperfect came the monkeys.
