= Ruhi Institute =

Baháʼí educational institution

- Spanish: Instituto Ruhí

Information
- Religious affiliation: Baháʼí Faith
- Affiliation: National Spiritual Assembly
- Website: www.ruhi.org/en

The Ruhi Institute (Spanish: Instituto Ruhí) is an educational institution, initially operating under the guidance of the National Spiritual Assembly of the Baháʼí Faith in Colombia.

== History ==
The format of group adult learning such as that in a Baháʼí study circle, the normal setting of a Ruhi Institute meeting, has occurred in previous contexts, such as in the United States Chautauqua developments in the 1870s, using "ideals of democracy, participation, and equality."

Moreover, the Baháʼí community has used the term "institute" in various ways over time. A 1927 report in Baháʼí News refers to an "institute", the "Institute of World Unity" held at Green Acre. A 1935 letter of Leroy Ioas noted a reason to promote small group meetings, "firesides", as a central method to promote the religion was to overcome the community's relative introversion that he believed came from thinking that only special Baháʼís could "teach". A 1950 reference to "Conference Institutes" was reported at the US Baháʼí national convention. There was also a 1958 reference to institutes being held on college campuses. In 1961 a conference in American Samoa was called a "training institute" and another in Korea in 1963. The term was adopted with the beginning of the Nine Year Plan (starting in 1964) designated by the Universal House of Justice, the international governing institution of the Faith. The institute or training institute served the needs of the thousands who began entering the religion in areas where large-scale expansion was taking place. Such places needed a physical facility to which group after group of newly enrolled believers would be invited to attend courses that helped them deepen their knowledge of the principles of the Faith. Over the years, both in conjunction with and independent of these institutes, various courses —e.g., weekend institutes, five-day institutes, and nine-day institutes — were developed for the purpose of promulgating the fundamental verities of the religion. Growth of the religion into viable communities has presented challenges to Baháʼí institutions.

Baháʼí leadership envisioned a holistic process of education reflecting on "civilization and progress – that is to say, government, administration, charitable works, trades, arts and handicrafts, sciences, great inventions and discoveries and elaborate institutions, which are the activities essential to man” and "the education of all members of society." Arbab, Correa, and de Valcarcel first established FUNDAEC in Colombia to express such goals in a new curriculum in the 1970s. A key component of their work was founded on the basic tenet that the essence of humankind is spiritual and that helping individuals acquire spiritual attributes would lead to the advancement of civilization.

From these roots the Ruhi Foundation (named after Farzam Arbab's father) evolved as part of a wider process of community building among the Baháʼís in Colombia centered first in the town of Puerto Tejada, near Cali in the department of Cauca. The Ruhi Institute eventually fell under the guidance of the National Spiritual Assembly of the Baháʼí Faith in Colombia. Since 1992 it has been registered as the “Ruhí Foundation,” a legally independent non-profit organisation. Ruhi courses appeared in a wide range of study circles in various other countries. Early participants provided feedback to the authors and then over several years the first official release of books took place. As a result, materials include examples from several cultures which helps diverse participants relate to some of the cultural content of the materials. Since the late 1990s the Ruhi institute process has developed as an additional way to advance communities.

The current head of the religion, the Universal House of Justice, has noted the progress of the work since the early 2000s. They mentioned that “the great majority of National Spiritual Assemblies have chosen to adopt the course materials devised by the Ruhi Institute.” Especially in recent years, its training programs have been adopted by an increasing number of localities worldwide, promoting a "culture of learning" among its participants. By 2012 the Ruhiresources.org web site—operated by volunteers who are Ruhi tutors—allowed Ruhi tutor-created materials to be freely shared.

== Principles, goals and methods ==
The goal of the Ruhi Institute courses is to "evoke a transformative learning experience through a learner-centered, experiential, and collaborative approach facilitated by a tutor rather than an instructor, a teacher, or an expert." Academics have identified the practice as an instance of praxeology. The tutor roles "refer to functions we perform at a given time and not to positions we (sic) hold in the community.'" Indeed Ruhi restructures societal norms, roles, and goals of education "…to re-vision societal images and systems of education as part of the design of new systems of learning and human development that are consonant with the emerging global world-view." The courses are designed to be run with organically developed groups of learners, using "critical reflection, interactive thinking, activities designed to transform theory into practical action". Tutors who facilitate courses are to reflect on their motives and encouraged to perform their role as virtuous service. Tutoring is not a position of authority but a service to the community - an explicit factor in training of tutors, seeking to foster “beautiful behaviors” to function as "friends teaching friends". The course "applies the concept of 'being and doing' and incorporates 'action and reflection' as a key learning strategy." Priorities folded into the process of the courses and their refinement include "Projecting a systemic, global world-view"; "ensuring the right to learn and the right to know"; "nurturing the development of diversity"; "providing the competencies to make interdependence a social reality"; (and) "providing for social and cultural evolution."

Any group that goes through a course would be encouraged to pursue a service project as a means of putting their learning into action Such projects typtically comprise organizing devotional meetings, developing skills in raising the quality of discourses on social concerns, and becoming a teacher of children. Community service is framed by the contexts the individuals bring to the group and their sense of purpose about it - and through several courses the suggested projects grow in complexity. Some have grown into their own local NGOs. The transcending goal is spiritual and moral empowerment to serve the society and the Faith by cultivating attributes such as a "humble posture of learning, dedication to the application of the teachings, a responsibility for one's own personal growth, and growth of the Baháʼí community." The progress of individuals in learning virtues like humility, patience and tact advanced amidst a feeling of empowerment. A kind of citizenship.

The materials prepared by the Ruhi Institute focus on the Baháʼí writings by assisting participants to understand the texts on three different levels. The first level is that of basic comprehension — understanding the meanings of the words and sentences. The second level relates to the application of the texts to various real-world situations. Finally, the third level deals with the implications of the various quotations on other aspects of Baháʼí belief and action.

=== Results ===
The goal of a universal sense of active and observable citizenship in the Faith has remained elusive. Although membership in the religion has been growing, not everyone has actively participated in social activities. Researchers have reviewed the limitations of traditional pedagogies in the West, but some contend similar problems exist world-wide. Since 2008, various academics have reviewed the Ruhi program. In the words of one researcher it is "…becoming the core of Baháʼí community life worldwide as the outcome of a process that has sought to nurture the spiritual life of individuals and families and to establish social foundations for the vision and practice of religious world citizenship."

Academic studies have measured different aspects of Ruhi. One doctoral thesis examined the Ruhi courses using a combination of academic approaches to reflective and critical learning, experiential learning, and moral/ethical contexts. Mortensen interviewed participants before and after a series of courses. Over a 6-month period, the study started with participants in the Midwestern United States and in a later phase was expanded to areas in Canada, Iran, Ethiopia, South Korea, Turkey, and the United Kingdom. Mortensen included recommendations in his thesis. and hoped his results would be considered in adjusting the courses. He found a significant minority of participants took the course based on the mandate of the Universal House of Justice and small number were not Baháʼís and came as a result of being personally invited by friends or family. A majority liked that the curriculum was built around social or group learning, having a chance to learn from other people as well as bring their own experience to the study circle, and appreciated the natural laughter that arose. All the non-Baháʼís interviewed went on to take additional Ruhi classes, none of the participants voiced disappointment or dissatisfaction with the Ruhi method of education itself; the majority underscored what was to them the unusual component that much of the work and learning of a study course was done in a community setting.

In another review, workers in adult education "found harmony between the concepts developed in the Ruhi Institute and adult education principles." A review in China and neighboring communities investigated practices of "religious citizenship" as a result of the Ruhi Institute. The Ruhi formula resulted in "nonhierarchical, self-initiated, self-organized small groups engaged in study, teaching, and action", which is transforming the broader Baháʼí culture to one of small group community building among natural networks of family and friends, a format that is politically viable in China and adaptable to space limits in Hong Kong.

A published case study compared developments in three instances of Baháʼís fostering development among indigenous cultures - a Guaymí cultural center in Panama, a regional socio-economic development committee of Kivu, Zaire, and the specific original development of the Baháʼí Ruhi Institute in Colombia: "They demonstrate the importance of evolutionary guiding images, of the conceptual support of actions, evolutionary competence, the contribution of second-order actions and the purposeful design of the system of interactive dimensions that operate on individual and societal levels to the design of human systems.… (by those) who are so often considered marginal, irrelevant, and ignorant of the challenges of an interdependent world society." The reviewers saw two implications - "The motivating force which empowered participants, provided a vision, and nurtured evolutionary competence was in every case a powerfully felt commitment to Baháʼí religious beliefs" and each of the three was "designed and carried forward by the efforts of a small group of highly motivated individuals whose leadership style is characterized by such evolutionary values as cooperation, service, interdependence, humility, and the like."

== Main sequence of courses ==
The following is a list of titles of the available materials for age 15 and above. More titles are under development.

- Book 1: Reflections on the Life of the Spirit
- Book 2: Arising to Serve
- Book 3: Teaching Children’s Classes
- Book 4: The Twin Manifestations
- Book 5: Releasing the Powers of Junior Youth
- Book 6: Teaching the Cause
- Book 7: Walking Together on a Path of Service
- Book 8: The Covenant of Bahá’u’lláh
- Book 9: Gaining an Historical Perspective
- Book 10: Building Vibrant Communities
- Book 11: Material Means
- Book 12: Family and the Community
- Book 13: Engaging in Social Action
- Book 14: Participating in Public Discourse

=== Junior youth spiritual empowerment program ===
The following titles are used for youth aged 12 to 15.

- Breezes of Confirmation
- Glimmerings of Hope
- Wellspring of Joy
- Walking the Straight Path
- Habits of an Orderly Mind
- On Health and Well-Being
- Learning About Excellence
- Thinking About Numbers
- Observation and Insight
- The Human Temple
- Drawing on the Power of the Word
- Making Sense of Data

Bahá'í related subjects:

- Spirit of Faith
- Power of the Holy Spirit
- Rays of Light

== See also ==
- Baháʼí Faith in Colombia
- FUNDAEC
- Socio-economic development (Baháʼí)
- Baháʼí school
