= Contratación =

Coordinates: 6°17′N 73°29′W

- Municipality and town
- Flag

- Location of the municipality and town of Contratación in the Santander Department of Colombia.
- Country: Colombia
- Department: Santander Department
- Time zone: UTC-5 (Colombia Standard Time)

Contratación (Spanish pronunciation: [kontɾataˈsjon]) is a town and municipality in the Santander Department in northeastern Colombia.
