= Nur University =

Nur University of Bolivia was established as a Baháʼí school of higher education in August 1984 (41 years ago) and started its first academic year in April 1985.

== History ==
Following development of the Foundation for the Integral Development of Bolivia (FUNDESIB) in 1982, Nur University received Presidential Decree No. 20441 authorizing its establishment as a private university. It began offering undergraduate programs in 1985 and became Bolivia's first graduate college in 1994.

In 1996, Nur trained 2000 rural teachers as agents of community development in Bolivia and 300 teachers in the La Rioja Province in Argentina.

The Bolivian Ministry of Education, Culture and Sports contracted Nur in 1999 to strengthen the academic and administrative capacities of two state teachers colleges: INSPOC in Camiri and INS Rafael Chávez Ortiz in Portachuelo.

The university has 4,000 registered students in 17 undergraduate and graduate programs offered full- or part-time or through distance education.

== Accreditation and honors ==
In 2000 the university received the highest distinction granted by the Santa Cruz Municipal Government, the Municipal Merit Medal, given for the community service work developed by the university through UNIRSE (University Students in Service to the Community). That same year Nur University received the "Pioneers in Education" prize, granted by the Bolivian Center for Research and Educational Action.

In 2001, the Ministry of Education, Culture and Sports called upon all the private universities in the country to submit to an evaluation process in accordance with the new private university regulations, in which Nur was evaluated as a "Full University".

In 2002 Nur University was selected as a "Center for Educational Excellence" for the Andean region: an initiative launched at the Summit for the Americas, supported by the United States Agency for International Development (USAID).
