= FUNDAEC =

Latin America rural development organization

FUNDAEC, the acronym in Spanish for “The Foundation for the Application and Teaching of the Sciences”, is a non-profit, non-governmental organization that focuses on training and development in the rural areas of Colombia and other countries in Latin America. It was created in 1974 in Colombia by a group of scientists and professionals led by Farzam Arbab, a renowned physicist who had arrived as a visiting professor to the University of Valle in 1970.

There are two main programs—the Tutorial Learning System (SAT), a secondary level educational system used by over 25,000 students throughout the Americas, and the University Center for Rural Well-Being (CUBR). The curriculum aims to develop in its students capabilities in five main fields: mathematics, science, language and communication, technology, and service to the community.

As of 2017, FUNDAEC's program director is Bita Correa.

== Overview ==
In 1974 FUNDAEC was founded by a group of professors at the University of Valle. According to Gustavo Correa, director of FUNDAEC in 2002, it was originally inspired by a quotation from Baháʼu'lláh talks about man as 'a mine rich in gems of inestimable value.'" He says that 'education can, alone, cause it to reveal its treasures, and enable mankind to benefit therefrom'. Its founding ideals included:

- Not seeing the people as masses of undernourished people, overwhelmed by problems and needs-housing, employment, sanitation, education—but instead considering the participants of its programs as irreplaceable resources in a self-sustaining process of change.
- The strong conviction that every human being possesses great potentialities that an appropriate educational process can help develop and channel towards service to the community and to society at large.
- To analyze problems of poverty and social disintegration keeping an eye on the tendency to reduce people to an object of manipulation by either an unjust market or a deified state, to an insatiable pleasure seeking consumer of goods, or an untiring participant in power struggles.
- An acceptance of two interacting aspects of human nature: the basic drive of material survival and the reality of man's spiritual nature, with infinite potentialities for qualities such as love, justice, and generosity.
- Avoiding an unbalanced obsession with industrialization unattainable by and undesirable for the majority of humanity; not romantic conceptions of traditional untechnological societies of subsistence and peasant economies but a search for a scientifically and technologically modern society, which, however, would base its educational, economic, administrative, political, and cultural structures on the concept of the integral nature of man rather than his mere material needs.
- The rural university would be a social space in which two systems of knowledge, a modern one (in all its sophistication) and a traditional one pertaining to the people of the region would interact in a healthy way to produce important development processes from within the rural population itself.
- The Rural University would have to pursue its goals with the understanding that all the processes of rural life, production, simple construction and repair, marketing, the development of human resources, socialization, the flow of information, adaptation and the improvement of technologies, health care and sanitation, and decision–making are in need of structures that may connect them to the corresponding structures of the political, social, economic, and cultural life of an evolving global society.

FUNDAEC was instituted as a private development foundation based in Cali, and has developed a number of development projects centered around a goal that rural populations should not only benefit from higher education, but should also actively participate in creating and generating knowledge and technologies, to improve their quality of life and standard of living. FUNDAEC sought to dispel the image of the poor farmer whose life must be planned and managed by more privileged members of society.

== Projects ==
Projects of FUNDAEC began with the Centro Universitario de Bienestar Rural (CUBR), the "University Center for Rural Well-being" in 1980 to serve as a basis of expertise for development and review of programs and projects. In 1987, the "System for Tutorial Learning" (SAT, the Spanish acronym for "Sistema de Aprendizaje Tutorial") was established which has been used in 13 of the 32 Departments of Colombia by 1996. SAT has been credited, after wide implementation, with cutting the process of urbanization, increases in democratic behavior and aspects of gender equality, extra curricular activities in communities, stopping migratory movement of populations, and established public-private cooperation. The system has been replicated by request of the government, and in 1996 it was evaluated by the government of Honduras for use there. The curriculum is uniquely formulated for rural students, using a series of highly interactive workbooks, and trained tutors who are themselves from rural areas present the curriculum on a flexible schedule to meet the needs of rural students. The curriculum aims at the skills required for living in the countryside instead of abstract sciences but was developed from the ground up for the rural inhabitants. One way to become a tutor of the program is to graduate from its series of workbooks and start offering a class registered with the government. Since the focus stays in the community, the community becomes stronger. FUNDAEC has won the Change the World -- Best Practice Award for its SAT program from the Club of Budapest and characterized as “the best educatory project of the time”, according to Ernst Ulrich von Weizsäcker. By 2002 the SAT system was in use in Honduras, Guatemala, Ecuador, Venezuela, Panama, Costa Rica, Brazil, Colombia and the first phases of the implementation of the program had started in Zambia. Parallel to the SAT project, FUNDAEC began a micro-finance initiative as well.

== See also ==
- Socio-economic development (Baháʼí)
- History of Colombia from the 1970s
- Ruhi Institute
- Baháʼí Faith in Colombia
