= Craugastor tabasarae =

Conservation status
- Critically Endangered (IUCN 3.1)

Scientific classification
- Kingdom: Animalia
- Phylum: Chordata
- Class: Amphibia
- Order: Anura
- Family: Craugastoridae
- Genus: Craugastor
- Subgenus: Craugastor
- Species: C. tabasarae

Binomial name
- Craugastor tabasarae (Savage, Hollingsworth, Lips, and Jaslow, 2004)

Synonyms
- Eleutherodactylus tabasarae Savage, Hollingsworth, Lips, and Jaslow, 2004

Species of frog

Craugastor tabasarae is a species of frog in the family Craugastoridae. It is endemic to Panama and known from a few isolated records in the Veraguas, Coclé, Colón, and Panamá Provinces. The range includes the eponymous Serranía de Tabasará.

== Description ==
Adult males measure 29–34 mm (1.1–1.3 in) and adult females 49–54 mm (1.9–2.1 in) in snout–vent length. The tympanum is distinct albeit heavily pigmented, and round in males whereas subelliptical in females. The finger and toe tips are expanded into discs. The toes are basally webbed. Coloration is dorsally cocoa brown with medium-sized darker brown blotches interspersed with lemon yellow. The lips are barred with brown and lemon yellow. The upper thigh surface has dark brown to black irregular bars, interspersed with bright orange-red bars. The chin, chest, and venter are custard yellow. The limbs are ventrally bright yellow with scattered brown spots. The iris is silvery tan to golden above and dark brown to black below.

== Habitat and conservation ==
Craugastor tabasarae occurs in premontane forest at elevations of 600–910 m (1,970–2,990 ft) above sea level. They are typically at night up to 2 m (6 ft 7 in) above the ground on vegetation overhanging or near streams. Development is presumably direct (i.e., no free-living larval stage).

This species is rare, and at least one population has crashed and might be now extinct. The species is threatened by the spread of the chytrid fungus Batrachochytrium dendrobatidis as well as by habitat loss. It has been recorded in the D. Omar Torríjos. H. and Chagres National Parks.
