= Mama Tata =

Christian syncretistic religion

Mama Tata or Mama Chi (Mother Father) is a Christian syncretistic religion found in parts of Panama. It is a mixture of Catholicism and animism that has become popular among the Guaymí people. It began in the second half of the twentieth century, after prophetess Little Mama had a vision of Jesus riding up to her on a motorcycle.

== Beliefs ==
Members of Mama Tata believe that God has abolished the Church and is now relating exclusively with the Guaymí through Little Mama who had a vision of Mary (Big Mama) and Jesus. Adherents believe that only Guaymí followers of this religion will go to heaven.

== History ==
On September 22, 1962, in the community of Krunbiti (a village in the corregimiento of Boca de Balsa), in the western area of what is now the comarca, a young Indigenous woman named Delia Bejerano de Atencio—known by her Indigenous name Besikö Kruningrobu—reported a visionary experience. According to her account, during a storm, the Virgin Mary and Jesus Christ descended from the sky in a metallic apparatus resembling a motorcycle. Despite the rain, both figures remained dry and entered her home. When the Virgin sat on the home's wooden seat (jorón), it miraculously transformed into a cushioned bed. After about an hour, the man who identified himself as Jesus delivered a divine message to Besikö: he had come to destroy the world due to the excessive behavior of the Indigenous people, particularly their practice of balsería (a traditional festival involving displays of strength and heavy alcohol consumption). However, the Virgin opposed this punishment. The two figures tasked Besikö with spreading a message of repentance and evangelization to avert divine wrath.

Besikö began preaching her revelation in Boca de Balsa before an audience of approximately 3,000 people. Moved by her message, many reportedly repented for their excesses and converted to the emerging religion of Mama Tatda. Boca de Balsa soon became a center of religious pilgrimage, drawing Indigenous people from as far as Bocas del Toro to Veraguas.

However, Besikö's ministry was cut short when she died suddenly from a severe fever on September 14, 1964, at the age of 23. She left behind a two-year-old daughter, Emilce Atencio, who would later rise to become the next religious leader of Mama Tatda.
