= Zikrullah Khadem =

Iranian follower of the Baháʼí Faith

Zikrullah Khadem

Zikrullah Khadem (Arabic: ذكر الله خادم, or Dhikru'lláh Khádim; 1904–1986) was an Iranian follower of the Baháʼí Faith, appointed for life by its leader to a leadership role as a Hand of the Cause in February 1952. The 27 Hands played a key role in the transition of power in the religion during the leadership crisis after the death of Shoghi Effendi in 1957.

After his appointment in 1952, he worked full-time in the Baháʼí Faith and travelled extensively throughout Iran, Africa, Europe, the USA, and at least 50 countries around the world. In the 1960s Khadem and fellow Hand William Sears were the two most prominent Baháʼí figures in the Western hemisphere, and were responsible for both spreading the religion and maintaining its unity.

Before 1952 he worked for a British oil company in southern Iran and the Iraqi Embassy in Tehran. He was fluent in Persian, Arabic, English, and French and was a translator. He wrote several articles in Persian and English, a book about Shoghi Effendi in Persian, and 134 volumes documenting all Baháʼí holy places, submitted in 1977 at the request of the Universal House of Justice.

== Background ==
Khadem was born in Tehran in 1904, the second child of Nasru'lláh and Rádiyyih. His father served ʻAbdu'l-Bahá in ʻAkká in the 1890s and received the title ʻKhádim (servant) from him, which was adopted as the family's surname. Zikrullah taught briefly at the Tarbiyat Baháʼí school in Tehran, then worked for the Anglo-Persian Oil Company as chief interpreter and director of education, teaching Persian to the English-speaking employees. He was then selected to be the personal assistant to the British general manager of the company.

Khadem first went on pilgrimage to the Baháʼí World Centre in 1925, where he met Shoghi Effendi – a meeting that he said transformed his life. While there he assisted with some of the layout of the Shrine of the Báb. In 1930 he left the oil company and began work as a secretary of the Iraqi embassy in Tehran, which benefitted from his multilingual fluency. He married Javidukht Javid on 3 October 1933, and later had five children: Mozhan, Jena, Riaz, Ramin and May. Unusually for Iranians in those days, he encouraged his wife to pursue academic aspirations, and she received a bachelor's degree from the University of Tehran. Along with his wife, throughout the 1930s and 40s he travelled around Iran visiting nearly every city on assignments from Shoghi Effendi, visiting new believers and photographing sites of historical significance. While visiting Nayriz, he was temporarily jailed. He also made several more trips to Haifa in 1937, 1938, 1939, 1940, and 1951.

Khadem served on the National Spiritual Assembly of the Baháʼís of Iran from 1938 to 1960 (though his memorial in the Baháʼí News Service gives the dates as 1949-1960) and served as its treasurer in the 1950s. Between 1940 and 1957, Khadem was the main conduit for communications from Shoghi Effendi to Baháʼí institutions and individuals in Iran. During WWII, as there was no postal service, he personally arranged message delivery, even chartering private planes to move mail.

Khadem was responsible for securing and transporting several artifacts related to the early development of the religion, such as an original Kitáb-i-Íqán in ʻAbdu'l-Bahá's handwriting (with notations by Baha'u'llah) and the sword of Mullá Husayn, which is currently held at the Baháʼí World Centre archives.

== As a Hand of the Cause ==
Khadem was still attached to the embassy in Tehran when in February of 1952 he received a notice from Shoghi Effendi appointing him as a Hand of the Cause, the highest appointed role in the religion. Only 50 were ever appointed, and the title is no longer given out. Having prospered as a real estate developer, he determined to carry out all his services at his own expense. He subsequently worked full-time for Shoghi Effendi, travelling initially to a Baháʼí conference in Rome in March, and then to all the Baháʼí centers in Europe. Bessie Neill, writing for The Press Democrat, wrote in 1963 that in the previous 11 years he had visited Bahai communities in North and South America and in Israel.

He travelled to over 50 countries from 1953 to 1963, and over 1,000 Baháʼí communities, becoming one of the most widely-travelled Baháʼís in the world. Hugh Adamson wrote that in the 1950s he had traveled on Bahai business to:

Central and South America... India, Pakistan, the Arabian Peninsula, and Iraq... Japan, Taiwan, Hong Kong, Macau, Thailand, Burma... Italy, Switzerland, Denmark, the United States, Panama, Costa Rica, Nicaragua, Honduras, El Salvador, Guatemala, British Honduras, Mexico, Canada, Sweden, Finland, Norway, Holland, Belgium, Luxembourg, and France... Australia... Indonesia... and Singapore

=== Leadership crisis ===
The religion went through a crisis from 1957 to 1963. Shoghi Effendi died on 4 November 1957 without having appointed a successor, and the 27 living Hands gathered in a series of 6 confidential conclaves (or signed agreements if they were absent) to decide how to navigate the uncharted situation. Khadem and the rest made an announcement on 25 November 1957 to assume control of the Faith, certified that Shoghi Effendi had left no will or appointment of successor, said that no appointment could have been made, and elected 9 of their members to reside at the Baháʼí World Centre in Haifa to represent the body of the Hands and to exercise the executive functions of the Guardian (these were known as the Custodians). From October to December in 1958 Zikrullah Khadem substituted as a member of the nine custodial Hands in Haifa, then continued travelling.

In late 1959 Khadem dedicated himself to moving to the western hemisphere, but it took him almost a year to resolve affairs in Iran before he moved to the United States in 1960. He was the first Hand of the Cause to reside in the western hemisphere.

=== In the United States ===
Khadem and his wife initially resided in Champaign, Illinois, then in Urbana, Illinois. In 1962, he went as a missionary to the Baháʼí Faith to the Navajo Indian Reservation in Arizona, and his wife posthumously established a scholarship in his name for health education among the native population.

In 1963 the Hands called for the election of the Universal House of Justice and exempted themselves from eligibility. Khadem attended the election, after which the custodial Hands of the Cause closed their office.

The family spent two years in Staten Island, New York from 1965-1967, then in 1967 they moved to Evanston, Illinois, and finally Skokie, Illinois. By 1971 he was one of only 17 Hands of the Cause still living. In 1972 the Universal House of Justice asked Khadem to research and document places and people of historical significance to Baháʼís, which he concluded in 1977 with a 134-volume work that was submitted to the Universal House of Justice.

== Death ==
Khadem died on the morning of 13 November 1986. His funeral service was held Saturday, 15 November 1986, and he was buried the same day at Memorial Park Cemetery in Skokie, Illinois. After he died there were 8 remaining Hands of the Cause still alive.

Four years after his death, his wife, Javadukht Khadem, published the biography Zikrullah Khadem, With Love (1990), which she later expanded and published in Persian and Spanish.
