= Ngäbe =

Ethnic group of present-day Panama and Costa Rica

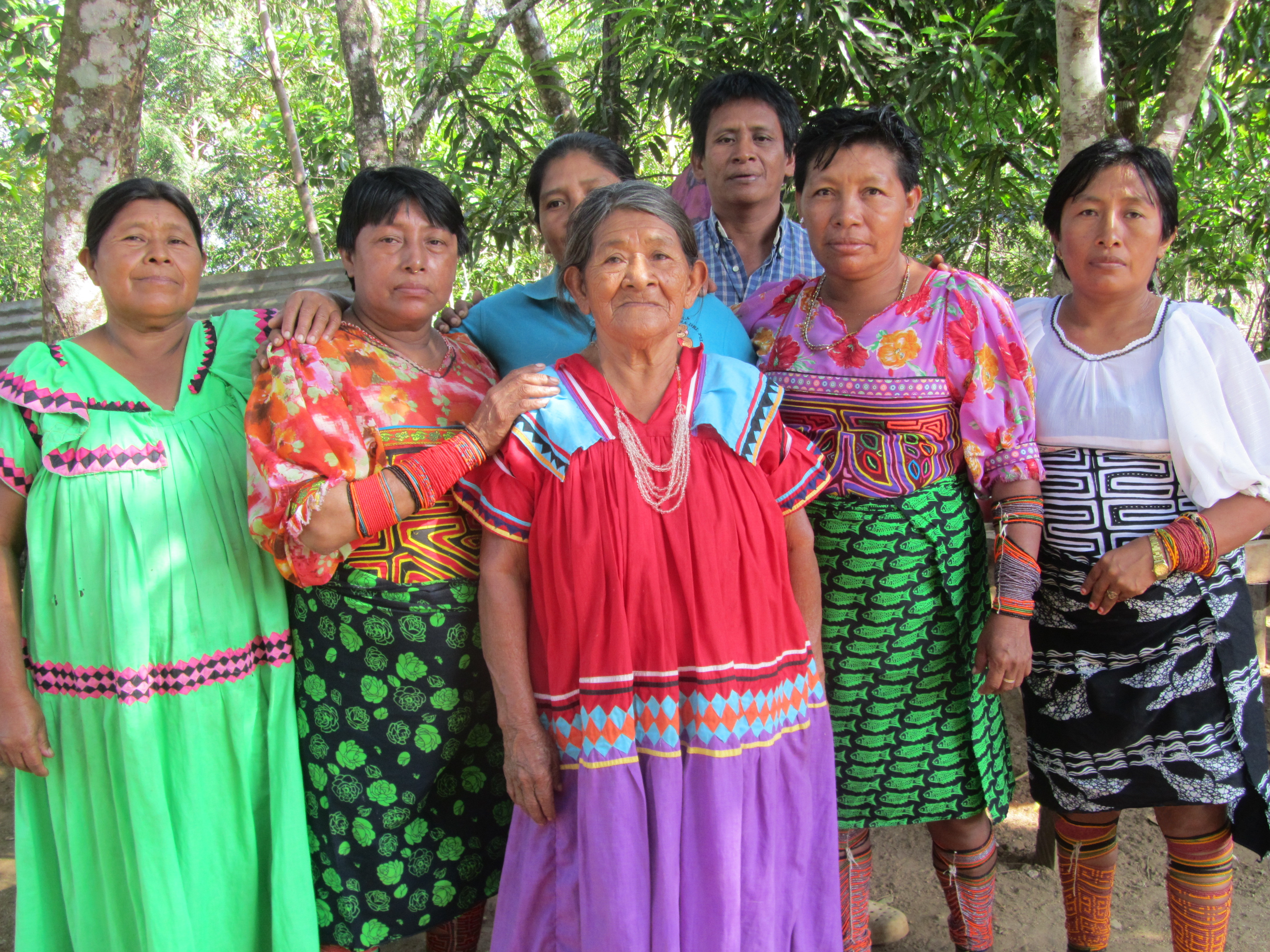
- Ngäbe women and men

Total population
- c. 270,000

Regions with significant populations
- Panama: 260,058 (2010)
- Costa Rica: 5,360 (2000)

Languages
- Ngäbere language

Religion
- Sukianism, Mama Tata, Christianity, Baháʼí Faith

The Ngäbe are an Indigenous people within the territories of present-day Panama and Costa Rica in Central America. The Ngäbe mostly live within the Ngäbe-Buglé comarca in the Western Panamanian provinces of Veraguas, Chiriquí and Bocas del Toro. They also have five Indigenous territories in southwestern Costa Rica, encompassing 23,600 hectares: Coto Brus, Abrojos Montezuma, Conte Burica, Altos de San Antonio and Guaymi de Osa. In the early 21st century, there are approximately 200,000-250,000 speakers of the Ngäbere language.

Guaymí is an outdated name, derived by the Spanish colonists from the Buglere term for this people (guaymiri). Local newspapers and other media often alternatively spell the name Ngäbe as Ngobe or Ngöbe because Spanish does not contain the sound represented by ä, a low-back rounded a, slightly higher than the English aw in the word saw. Spanish speakers hear ä as either an o or an a. Ngäbe means "people" in their native language of Ngäbere. Numerous Ngäbe have migrated to Costa Rica in search of work on the coffee fincas. Ngäbere and Buglere are distinct languages in the Chibchan language family.

== History ==
Ngäbe territory originally extended from the Pacific Ocean to the Caribbean Sea, though there was never an empire or a distinctive “Ngäbe territory”. Most Ngäbe lived in dispersed villages, which were run by chiefs and influential families. Few, if any, Ngäbe occupied the mountainous region in which they now live. They retreated to that area under pressure from Spanish colonists and development of low-lying areas.

Christopher Columbus and his men contacted the Ngäbe in 1502, in what is now known as the Bocas del Toro province in northwestern Panama. He was repelled by a Ngäbe leader with either the name or title of Quibían. Since that contact, Spanish conquistadors, Latino cattle ranchers, and the development of large banana plantations successively forced the Ngäbe into the less desirable mountainous regions in the west. Many Ngäbe were never defeated in battle, including the famous cacique Urracá who in the 16th century united nearby communities in a more than seven-year struggle against the Conquistadors. Those Ngäbe who survived on the outskirts of this region began to slowly intermarry with the Latinos and became part of what are now termed campesinos, or rural Panamanians with Indigenous roots.

In the early 1970s the Torrijos administration tried to encourage the Ngäbe to form more compact communities by building roads, schools, clinics, and other infrastructure in designated points in what is now the Comarca Ngäbe-Buglé. This marked a social change in lifestyle, as formerly dispersed villages and family units did converge and form larger communities.

In 1997, after years of struggle with the Panamanian government, the Ngäbe were granted a Comarca, or semi-autonomous area. The majority now live within its boundaries.

The Spanish found three distinct Guaymi tribes in what is today's western Panama; each was named after its chief and each spoke a different language. The chiefs were Natá, in Coclé Province; Parita in the Azuero Peninsula; and the greatest chief Urracá, in what is now Veraguas Province.

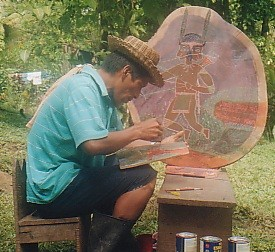
Guaymi Indian painting

Urracá became famous by defeating the Spaniards time after time. He forced Diego de Albitez, a captain of the Spanish, to sign a peace treaty in 1522. He was betrayed and sent in chains to the town of Nombre de Dios on the Atlantic coast. According to historian Bartolomé de las Casas, Urracá escaped and made his way back to the mountains, vowing to fight the Spaniards unto death. He fulfilled his vow. Urracá was so feared by the Spaniards that they avoided combat with his forces. When Urracá died in 1531, he was still a free man.

The Ngäbe lived in two large groups: those of the lowlands along the Atlantic coast, and those of the tropical forest in the highlands of Veraguas and Chiriquí Province. They never surrendered and fought until the collapse of the Spanish Empire in the nineteenth century. When Panama broke away from Spain and joined Colombia in the early 19th century, the Ngäbe remained in the mountains. In the 21st century, some are slowly assimilating into Panamanian society.

== Government ==
The Ngäbe traditionally organized in millions of farms or otherwise lived nomadically in family units. The chiefdoms were run by a chief, who often had an assistant, or cabra, and a council of advisers.

In 2012, the Ngäbe adopted a system intended to integrate their traditional government with the modern Panamanian system. As such, the Ngäbe have Official Administrative Authorities and Traditional Authorities. The Administrative Authorities include: a governor and vice governor, mayors for each of the seven districts, and representatives of each county within the districts. These are elected by the people. (Or appointed by national government?)

The Traditional Authorities include a congress, which is led by a general congressional president and three regional congressional presidents. The congress works in conjunction with a general Chief, three Regional Chiefs (regional level), and seven Local Chiefs (district level). The Chief acts mostly as a voice of the people but can hold considerable and influential power in that capacity.

- The Three Regions: Ñö Kribo, Kädriri, Nedrini
- The Seven Districts: Besiko, Jirondai, Kankintu, Kusapín, Mirono, Münä, Nole Duima, Ñürüm, Santa Catalina o Calovébora (Bledeshia)

== The land ==
The Comarca Ngäbe-Bugle is approximately 6,700 square kilometers, encompassing areas of the three westernmost provinces of Panamá: Bocas del Toro, Chiriqui and Veraguas. Altitude varies from about 350 feet above sea level to over 7,000 feet in the central mountains; only about half of this land is arable.

A few Ngäbe have acquired solar electricity (through an electrification project), as well as cell phone service. Most still live below the poverty level and do not own modern technology. Because of the rugged geography, building roads and new infrastructure to Ngäbe reservations has been expensive and difficult for the government. Some Ngäbe choose to live secluded from modern societies.

== Economy ==
In the early 21st century, most Ngäbe work as subsistence farmers and agricultural laborers. On the Pacific slopes, the main crops are rice, corn, yucca, otoy, ñame, and several species of beans. Small-scale livestock production of chickens and pigs is maintained. In the higher elevations, such livestock is supplemented by hunting (where permitted). The primary crop for the Ngäbe on the Atlantic slopes is green bananas.

In order to survive, many Ngäbe resort to working in the cash economy. They pick coffee, work on large cattle ranches, and on banana plantations to make cash. Also, some Ngäbe sell traditional beaded necklaces on the side of the roads in Panama. The Ngäbe women make many traditional crafts, both for their own use and their families', but also to sell as extra income. These include handmade bags from plant fibers called kra, colorful dresses called nagua, and beaded bracelets and necklaces. The men weave hats from plant fibers.

Many of the coastal-living Ngäbe men, such as those living on the Bocas del Toro islands or on Punto Valiente, rely on ocean resources to provide for their families. They go spearfishing and lobster diving. They both consume and sell what they catch, depending on their circumstances at the time.

=== Conflicts ===
In the province Bocas del Toro, the Changuinola Dam was completed in 2011 as a project for flood control and production of hydroelectric power. The government took over great areas of the Ngöbe reserve, flooding it under waters of the reservoir behind the dam. According to a 2012 documentary by Al Jazeera, Panama: Village of the Damned, no compensation was made to the people whose land was taken.

In the territory of the Ngöbe, the Barro Blanco project is planned on the Tabasara River. Many townships along the riverbanks will be flooded, adversely affecting an estimated 5000 Ngöbe farmers. The Barro Blanco project is financed by European banks from Germany (German Investment Corporation, DEG) and the Netherlands (Netherlands Development Finance Company, FMO) and counts toward the global carbon offset goals set by nations at the UN. In February 2012 many Ngöbe protested against the new dam; two were killed in the confrontation and more than 100 injured or arrested. Many international environmental organizations have protested against the project, such as the German organization Rainforest Rescue, which wrote a petition, addressed to the DEG.

== Culture ==
=== Life passages ===
A woman is considered "sick" (bren) while pregnant, and pregnancy is almost never discussed, even during birth. When the baby is deemed healthy, people consider it safe to acknowledge the pregnancy. Many women have traditionally given birth in their homes, with the help of their mother or a midwife. The government has established some women's clinics in Ngobe territory, seeking to improve women's health. The staff have had to adapt some of their practices to accommodate the women's culture and to encourage traditional midwives to come to the hospital.

After a death, the immediate family will stay up all night with the body for several nights, drinking cacao and coffee, eating, and talking. Candles must remain lit all night. On the days leading up to the funeral, neighbors and friends will visit to offer their condolences; they will sit with the family members for part of the night.

A deep hole is dug, and a tunnel, or shelf is carved out in the bottom part of the hole. The casket is placed in the tunnel, so that the dirt that fills the hole does not fall on top of the casket. The mound is covered in otoe de lagardo leaves. When chewed, these sting and stain the mouth. They are put on the grave to prevent evil spirits from coming near. The deceased's possessions are placed on top of the grave as grave goods.

After the funeral, some families abstain from eating salt or sugar for four days in order to purify the body. After four days, each family member eats a spoonful of cooked bananas with salt and sugar to break this fast.

=== Dress ===
Since roughly the 1960s, Ngäbe women have worn full-length, short-sleeve dresses called "naguas". They extend from the neck to the ankles. It is widely believed that the dresses were introduced by Catholic missionaries for modesty's sake, as the Ngäbe traditionally wore loincloths and little else. The dresses are usually adorned with geometric patterns at the sleeve and neck lines, the waist, and at the bottom of the skirt. The classic Ngäbe geometric pattern is called "pintura" (paint), or "dientes" (teeth), and is said to represent mountains, animal teeth, the ripples of the river, or dragon scales.

Men typically wear collared cotton-and-polyester-blend shirts and polyester trousers. Some men wear farmer's hats made out of pita leaves, but most wear baseball caps adopted from urban residents. For most of the year, both genders wear "chancletas" (sandals) or rubber boots when moving about, due to Panama's heavy rainfall and the lack of infrastructure in the Comarca.

=== Religion ===
Spanish missionaries introduced Roman Catholicism in the early 1600s. Since the late 19th century, Protestant, Mormon and Evangelical missionaries of various types have also worked among the people. While the people are predominately Catholic, some Ngäbe have since adopted various forms of protestant Christian views, including:

- Jehovah's Witnesses
- Church of Jesus Christ of Latter-Day Saints (Mormonism)
- Church of Christ
- Cuerpo de Cristo
- Methodism
- Evangelicalism
- Seventh-day Adventism

The British Methodist Church established a mission field among the Guaymi Indians about 1926-27, under the leadership of the Rev. Ephraim S. Alphonse (1896-1995). Born locally on the island of Carenero, in Bocas del Toro Province, he was the son of John Alphonse, from Martinique, and Carlotha Reid, a native of Bluefields, Nicaragua. Both parents were of African descent. Alphonse first worked in the area as an engineer, but became increasingly interested in the Guaymi people. He lived, worked and raised his own family among the Valiente people on the Cusapin Peninsula.

Working with them to learn the language, he devised a written form and translated the four Gospels of the New Testament and many hymns into the Guaymi dialect. He created a Guaymi Grammar and developed a dictionary in Guaymi, Spanish and English. These were later printed by the Bible Society. Copies of Alphonse's work are held in the archives of the Smithsonian Institution in Washington, DC. The government honored him with the Order of Vasco Nuñez de Balboa and a Medal of Belisario de Porras

Noncomala is the name of a traditional deity.

Methodists established a main church in Cusapin and smaller congregations around the Peninsula. The Methodist Church also established a medical clinic in Cusapin.

Members of the Bahá’í Faith number around 8,000. Some writings of the faith have been translated into the native language.

==== Mama Tada ====
Mama Tada is a Ngäbe religion (some argue a cult), dating from September 1961. The Virgin Mary (and possibly Jesus – there are several stories) allegedly appeared before a Ngäbe woman named Besikö (pronounced "bessy-go") over the Fonseca River. She was given several messages and commands for her people. While the exact commands of the vision have been hotly disputed, they roughly consist of:

- Disengagement from Latino society, including schooling, merchant activities, and general contact
- Abolition of fences and therefore the end of property disputes
- Abolition of alcohol and the balseria festival
- Treatment of all fellow Ngäbe as "brothers and sisters"
- Abolition of fighting and killing over land, wife-beating, and maltreatment of children
- Saturday, the day of the vision, is a day for rest and prayer
- All Ngäbe should behave like good Christians

Besikö, thereafter more commonly known as Mama Chi, was also told that her people's failure to adhere to these principles within five years would result in the death of all Ngäbe. Mama Chi's preaching affected a great many Ngäbe, who adopted the principles to varying degrees of strictness. Not all complied within five years and the apocalyptic prediction proved false.

These original orders have been combined with Christian principles. Mama Tada is now considered more of a xenophobic, folk-style Christianity. Practitioners are noted as wary and resentful of Latinos, and do not drink or practice balseria. The Ngabe who practiced Mama Tada created a stronger sense of brotherhood. This religion is believed to have contributed to the Ngäbe's unified effort to earn their own autonomous area.

=== Balseria ===
The Balseria is a four-day festival and Ngäbe traditional sport. The sport consists of two players, who take turns throwing a four-foot-long balsa stick at their opponent's legs. The objective is to hit the opponent below the knees until he can no longer continue. Opponents meet before the match to decide how many sticks will be thrown by each (10 being few, 40 being a lot, and 20 being average). There is no tournament structure, and matches are initiated by challenge and request.

The event is initiated when one town invites to host and challenge another town. A good harvest or a reciprocal obligation to host are typical catalysts. Once a date is selected, the host presents the challenged with a knotted rope—each knot represents a day, and the rope is used as a countdown for the event. In the weeks leading up to balseria, participants in each town blow animal horns and other makeshift trumpets to announce the imminence of the event.

On the first day of balseria, the hosts receive the challenged in their town and provide food and drink (generally fermented corn, banana, and palm leaf liquor). The second day consists of much of the same. The unstated goal of both sides is to exhaust the other by festivities before the games on the third day. At dawn on the third day, the best balseros of each town lead a procession to a predetermined location and begin the games by facing one another. The dawn matches are supposed to be the best of the day and may feature up to 60 balsas being thrown. After the inaugural match, the rest of the day is informal. Matches are initiated through challenges. The only rules are that no two balseros from the same town can face one another, and players must hit each other below the knees. The "below the knees" rule is enforced by spectators and "teammates" of the players, the implied consequence being a fist fight. On the fourth day, the challenged leave, and the hosts take care of the inebriated and injured, who are unable to leave.

Attendees of balseria typically dress in traditional Ngäbe clothing and colors. They wear feathers, animal skins, and even entire animals on their backs. Some men also wear the woman's traditional dress, or nagua, to hide their legs during the match. Horns, whistles, and improvised trumpets are widely used.

Outside of the Comarca, balseria has a negative reputation in Panama; it is officially outlawed by the government. The general attitude is that balseria is a drunken, violent mess. According to the Ngäbe, while alcohol and violence are present during balseria, it is primarily a cultural event, a unique sport, and a chance to demonstrate pride in their heritage.

== Socioeconomic status ==
Among all the provinces in Panama, the Comarca Ngäbe-Bugle consistently score lowest in terms of human development, education, income, and social and economic investment indices. They are also most recently second lowest in life expectancy and employment rate.

Some facts:

- 60.5% of Ngäbes ten years older or above are literate and attend an average of 4.1 years of school
- 91.2% of Ngäbes are unemployed
- Ngäbe life expectancy is 67.9 years
- Ngäbe average annual income is $430
- 91.7% of the population lives in extreme poverty (that is, they make less than $2 a day)

Development projects like the Cerro Colorado mining project put Ngobe-Bugle ancestral lands in peril. Part of their area is under risk to be flooded by hydroelectricity project Barro Blanco. Scores of Ngabe men, women, and children were arrested in response to protest against the project.
