= Baháʼí Faith in Nigeria =

After an isolated presence in the late 1920s, the Baháʼí Faith in Nigeria begins with pioneering Baháʼís coming to Sub-Saharan West Africa in the 1950s especially following the efforts of Enoch Olinga who directly and indirectly affected the growth of the religion in Nigeria. Following growth across West Africa a regional National Spiritual Assembly was elected in 1956. As the community multiplied across cities and became diverse in its engagements, it elected its own National Spiritual Assembly by 1979. Estimates of membership vary widely - a 2001 estimate by Operation World showed 1000 Baháʼís in 2001 while the Association of Religion Data Archives (relying on World Christian Encyclopedia) estimated some 38,000 Baháʼís in 2005.

== Early years ==
Richard St. Barbe Baker lived and worked in some of the southern provinces of Nigeria in 1927-29, extending his Men of the Trees project of environmental conservation, and as a Baháʼí since 1925. In 1941 Nigerian Kingsley MBadiwe spoke at the New York Baháʼí center.

Wide-scale growth in the religion across Sub-Saharan Africa was observed to begin in 1950s and accelerated in the 1960s. In 1953, Shoghi Effendi, the head of the religion, planned an international teaching plan termed the Ten Year Crusade. During the teaching plan, Mr. and Mrs. Ali Nakhjavani drove by car with two African pioneers from Uganda to open new countries to the religion. The first pioneer settled in what was then French Equatorial Africa, and later Enoch Olinga went on to British Cameroon. By 1954, growth in the Baháʼí Faith in Cameroon resulted in five young Baháʼís who pioneered surrounding areas, each becoming a Knight of Baháʼu'lláh including Ghana, and Togo. Meanwhile, a Baháʼí book belonging to Olinga, Paris Talks, became the basis of a Baháʼí Church in Nigeria, in Calabar, which operated in 1955-56. Concurrently in 1956 there were over 1000 Baháʼís across North-West Africa, resulting in a regional National Spiritual Assembly including Nigeria with Olinga as the chairman with its seat in Tunis. The church was disconnected from the Baháʼí community, but it applied the Baháʼí teachings with virtually all of the Cameroonian men on one large palm plantation. The church was established, flourished, and then collapsed utterly unrecognized and unknown to the Baháʼí pioneers and to the international Baháʼí community until one of the founders tried to return the book. Both leaders of the church later officially joined the religion, and they helped form the first Local Spiritual Assembly of Calabar in 1957 and served in other positions.

== Development of the community ==
By 1964, while associated with the regional National Spiritual Assembly of North West Africa, Nigeria had a Local Spiritual Assembly in Aba (Nigeria), Afikpo, Akpabuyo, Aningeje, Asata Enugu(?), Calabar, Ibadan, Lagos, Nyaje, Owom, and Sapele, and smaller groups of Baháʼís in Ebute Metta, Ikot Okriba, Ojok, Old Ndebeji, Onitcha, and Oron, and isolated Baháʼís in Abakaliki, Abeokuta, Kontagura, Kwa Falls, Mbeban Village, and Umuahia. Following the death of Shoghi Effendi, the elected Universal House of Justice was head of the religion and began to re-organize the Baháʼí communities of Africa by splitting off national communities to form their own National Assemblies, from 1967 though the 1990s. From January to March 1970 Hand of the Cause Rúhíyyih Khanum crossed Africa from east to west visiting many of these country's communities including Nigeria meeting with individuals and institutions both Baháʼí and civic. After a Nigerian Civil War in 1967-70, the Baháʼí of Nigeria elected its own National Spiritual Assembly by 1979.

In 1982 the Baháʼí of Nigeria hosted one of five continental Conferences called for by the Universal House of Justice, held in honor of the anniversary of the death of Bahíyyih Khánum.

In 1983 a National Baháʼí Children's committee developed several materials for Baháʼí schools in Nigeria, including lessons for children on the topics "Baháʼí History", "Living the Baháʼí Life", and "Baháʼí Teachings".

In 1984 a West African Center for Baháʼí Studies presented papers at University of Ife, in Ile Ife.

Founded in 1986, by 2004 the Baháʼí Justice Society had members in several countries including Nigeria.

In 1996 Nigeria assisted in the election of the São Tomé National Spiritual Assembly.

== Modern community ==
The Baháʼís of Nigeria maintain a diversity of schools like the Harmatan Baháʼí school in Uyo, nursery schools and development projects in six communities in the fields of literacy, child education and farming.

The National Spiritual Assembly has appointed a National Baháʼí Office For The Advancement Of Women in Lagos. The Baháʼís of Ibadan and Idi-Ose held interfaith conferences with Christian, Hindu, and Moslem women, on "Women, Equality and Religion".

== Demographics ==
Estimates of membership vary widely - a 2001 estimate by Operation World showed 1000 Baháʼís in 2001 while the Association of Religion Data Archives (relying on World Christian Encyclopedia) estimated some 38,172 Baháʼís.

=== Notable individuals ===
Richard St. Barbe Baker was a well known forest conservationist and in 1927-9 he was the Assistant Conservator of Forests for the southern provinces of Nigeria.

Suheil Bushrui, who has done work on Perennial philosophy and is a noted scholar on Khalil Gibran and inaugurator of the University of Maryland, College Park Baháʼí Chair for World Peace, first taught in Nigeria at University of Ibadan before leaving for Lebanon in 1968.

Helen Elsie Austin lived in Lagos as a US Foreign Service Officer from 1960 to 1970, and serving as a Cultural attaché with the United States Information Agency. She also served in several roles on Baháʼí Spiritual Assemblies (the elected form of governance of the religion.)

Kiser Barnes was first elected as a member the Universal House of Justice in 2000. In the 1980s and 90s Barnes lived, worked professional, and served in the administration of the religion, in Nigeria. He was a Senior Lecturer in the Faculty of Law at Obafemi Awolowo University in Nigeria from 1980 to 1993, and earned a master's degree. He was appointed to progressively higher positions of service from 1981 to 1993.

== See also ==
- Demographics of Nigeria
- Religion in Nigeria
- History of Nigeria
- Baháʼí Faith in Cameroon
