= Baháʼí Faith in Chad =

Though the history of the Baháʼí Faith in Chad began after its independence in 1960, members of the religion were present in associated territories since 1953. The Baháʼís of Chad elected their first National Spiritual Assembly in 1971. Through succeeding decades Baháʼís have been active in a number of ways and by some counts have become the third largest international religion in Chad with over 80,300 members by 2000 and 96,800 in 2005, and 94,499 in 2010.

== Early history ==
Before independence the region of Chad was part of the French Equatorial Africa (as well as modern day Congo, Central Africa, and Gabon.) The first pioneers in the region were Max Kinyerezi who settled in what was then French Equatorial Africa (specifically in the area later part of Republic of the Congo), and Samson Mungono in the Belgian Congo (some other parts of which later became part of Chad); both arrived in 1953 from expansion of the Baháʼí Faith in Uganda in the same trip that delivered Enoch Olinga to British Cameroon. The Baháʼís organized these and neighboring areas into the regional National Spiritual Assembly of central and eastern Africa in 1956 - including Uganda, Tanganyika, Kenya, Belgian Congo, Ruanda-Urundi, French Equatorial Africa, Zanzibar, Comoro Is, Seychelles and Chagos Archipelago. However once Chad was politically independent none of the territory specific to Chad had a Baha'i in it until 1961. The first Baháʼí in Chad was Cleophas K. Vava in what was then called Fort Lamy, the capital. About November 1962 the national spiritual assembly of Central and West Africa was claiming over 14,000 people almost all of whom were not in Chad. The situation changed little when the regional assembly associations were changed in 1963 to align Chad with Uganda and other central African countries. Early pioneers were Dempsey and Adrienne Morgan arrived in December 1967. The first native Chadian Baháʼí, Ernest Nbouba, converted early in 1968. By Ridván 1968 there were 7 Chadian Baháʼís and two pioneers so a local assembly was elected. By 1969 the community had jumped to almost 1200 Baháʼís and thirteen assemblies among 63 localities Baháʼís were to be found in. There are anecdotes of a student returning home from Cameroon where he had heard of the religion and converted in Chad at the beginning of summer 1970. When he moved to Bongor in October to continue his studies he successfully spread his new religion among his fellow students and the growth extended into the city to become an area of six assemblies and over 125 Baháʼís by April 1971.

== Growth ==
Following the death of Shoghi Effendi, the elected Universal House of Justice was head of the religion and began to re-organized the Baháʼí communities of Africa by splitting off regional national communities to form their own National Assemblies from 1967 though the 1990s. The Baháʼí community was much stimulated by the arrival of the first Hand of the Cause to visit Chad, Rúhíyyih Khanum who had been crossing Africa from east to west visiting many country's communities including Chad. She arrived by way of Bangui in February 1970, on the tenth anniversary of Chad's independence, to Fort Lamy and visited there and in the villages of Gassi and Djari. During the two weeks visit she met with mostly individuals and institutions of the religion. In Gassi she helped dedicate the Baháʼí center being built. From Chad Khanum traveled into Cameroon. Two developments following her trip were the participation of Chad Baháʼís in the first regional national convention of central Africa held in Bangui (Uganda splitting off its own national assembly in 1970) and second, the Baháʼís of Chad attempted to be registered with the federal government but it turned out the government had no procedure to register a new religion organizing in the country. Chadian delegates to the regional convention arrived in time for pre-convention classes and saw Hand of the Cause Abu'l-Qásim Faizi who represented the Universal House of Justice. Consultation at the convention noted the fast growth of the religion in Chad and Faizi appointed Adrienne Morgan as an Auxiliary Board Member. Back in Chad and the pursuit of official recognition from the government, Aziz Navidi, a lawyer and pioneer, representing the Universal House of Justice, assisted by sharing information about the worldwide character of the religion to the authorities while appeals were processed by the community and government which was finally brought to the attention of then President, François Tombalbaye. Following this success in February the community gather in convention for the election of its first National Spiritual Assembly in April 1971 which was attended by Enoch Olinga who was himself then appointed as a Hand of the Cause. The convention was held in Gassi outside of Fort Lamy in part because a village chief had joined the religion and provided a large meeting space for the convention. An anecdote told by Olinga at the convention captured the need for the fast-growing community's need to study their new religion and understand it personally. He compared the need for daily prayer with the need for daily food. We don't wait for someone else to eat for us, nor should be wait for someone else to pray for us. The community of the religion in Fort Lamy was then counted at over one thousand while the community across Chad was characterized as being ninety-six local spiritual assemblies among the 300 localities with Baháʼís who had swollen to more than 8000. The second national convention held two days of classes for the delegates to understand the process and purpose of convention, of the national assembly, and their role as delegates and those of officers of the convention (which they too elect). The Baháʼís of Gassi had already formed a children's Baháʼí school while land for nine Baháʼí centers was donated at the convention and the consultation of the delegates focused on the need to French-speaking pioneers who understood the religion especially in outlying areas. In December 1972 bus loads and cars of youth came from Chad and the Central African Republic to Cameroon who hosted the first regional African youth conference.

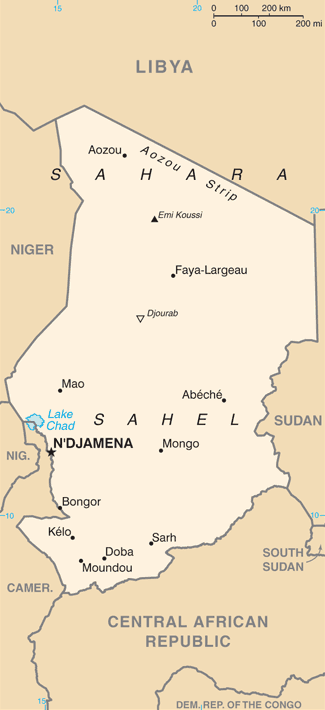
Map of Chad

In 1972 (and again in 1974) the Baháʼís of Chad celebrated the first United Nations Day of Chad. The public meeting held at the national Baháʼí center with the cooperation of United Nations Development Program Resident Representative featured an assistant of the UN Representative who spoke and offered literature while a Baháʼí spoke of the Baháʼí teachings - the event was covered by print and radio media in Chad and 50 people attended the meeting. The third national convention was held in Sarh in southern Chad where the mayor had donate use of the city's municipal center. In 1974 prayers were published translated into Massa, Ngambay and Kanuri languages. In October 1976 the Baháʼís held a national conference on the progress of the religion as part of a wave of such conferences across the world. Following the conference waves of traveling Baháʼís, some from Iran, brought the religion to villages as well as offering institutes to promote understanding of the religion and classes for children. In January 1977 the Baháʼís in Sahr held a conference for women at which only 12 of the 40 participants were Baháʼís following which a wave of conversions included half women. Other conferences continued through summer 1977. The community of Chad avoided being banned as part of a sweep across several Sub-Saharan countries. Chad was one of the countries Baháʼí organized a series of events in honor of the International Year of the Child, 1979. A Baháʼí consultant traveled western Africa including Chad assisting communities in their efforts. Though the consultant took ill in Chad, the program developed was the most successful in the region. A children's committee organized institutes for 125 villages and themselves conducted the meetings and produced a set of lesson plans in both French and English that was distributed to other West African communities. In 1981 the national convention was held in Moïssala In 1982 sixty of the local assemblies of Chad were designated as leaders in their regions to help nearby communities organize their religious meetings while at the same time a regional permanent institute was finished in Manda. In 1983 crowd surpassing the seats allotted turns out for a film describing Baháʼí pilgrimage in Moïssala.

=== Activities of a growing community ===
There is evidence of activities of the Baháʼí community through from the '80s through 2008 and some by invitation with third parties. Baháʼí youth have mobilized for a number of purposes over the years. Baháʼís have also been cooperative agents with various agencies and the Baháʼís started a non-governmental organization devoted to solving local ecological and developmental challenges. See details below. The overall process of advancing development projects gained the a diploma of Participation from the Trade Chamber at the fourth International Fair of Customs and Economic Union of Central Africa (later renamed the Economic Community of Central African States).

- Since the United Nations established the International Youth Year (IYY) in 1979 and in successive years plans have evolved for promoting the constructive action of youth. In 1985 Baháʼí youth in Chad mobilized to alleviate the suffering of thousands afflicted by famine by visiting the sick and elderly, preparing food and collected and distributed clothing. A regional youth conference was organized in Sarh with attendance of 200 youth from surrounding localities and planted three hectares of trees in Makiling in support of IYY. To encourage all youth clubs in Chad and their sponsoring local assemblies to undertake activities for IYY, the National Spiritual Assembly of the Baháʼís of Chad printed and distributed in large quantities of the official Youth Year emblem for all local communities. And Bahá´ís have continued to host United Nations Day as well as adding World Religion Day observances.
- In conjunction with the Chadian Ministry of Education, the Baháʼí community sponsored a program with a guest speaker for the International Literacy Year (see International Literacy Day) which was televised on 24 October 1989. After that the Baháʼí Faith was mentioned on local television in Mongo in 1996.
- Begun in Bongor and then moved to Sarh, the APRODEPIT, an acronym for Action pour la Promotion des Ressources des Organisations de Défense de l'Environnement et de la Pisciculture integrée au Tchad (Action for the Promotion of Resources for Organizations Defending the Environment and Integrated Pisciculture in Chad) is a Baháʼí-inspired non-governmental organization, stressing participation and consultation in an effort to promote conservation and community development along the Chari River since 1992.
- The US Embassy in Chad reported in 2008 that it had hosted an iftar dinner inviting representatives of the Muslim, Christian, and Baháʼí communities.

== Modern community ==
Long term pioneers are in Chad - some of many years stay and others of a short stay. There are Ruhi Institute Study Circles. There are weekly prayer meetings in French held on Saturday afternoons at the Baháʼí Center in N'Djamena. According to Baháʼí sources, the religion continued to grow through the 1980s establishing schools, libraries, a pharmacy and exhibits on Baháʼí marriage in the name of the religion. Sometimes more people came than could take classes while some of these institutions became self-sustaining.

=== Demographics ===
The World Christian Encyclopedia has estimated the Baháʼí population to be over 80,300 in 2000, 96,845 in 2005, and 94,499 in 2010. According to the website Religious Intelligence, the Baháʼí Faith is the third-largest internationally organized religion in the country after Islam and Christianity.

== See also ==
- Religion in Chad
- History of Chad
