= William Sears (Baháʼí) =

American writer and television and radio personality

William Sears

William Bernard Sears (March 28, 1911 – March 25, 1992) was an American writer and a popular television and radio personality in various shows culminating in the 1950s with In the Park but left television popularity to promote the Baháʼí Faith in Africa and embarked on a lifelong service to the religion, for some 35 years as Hand of the Cause, the highest institution of the religion he could be appointed to. He wrote many books about the religion, with Thief in the Night and God Loves Laughter being his most popular.

== Biography ==
=== Earliest life ===
William Bernard Sears was born March 28, 1911, in Aitkin, Minnesota, to the Irish American household of Frank and Ethel Sears. William was the youngest child of four, and Frank and Ethel's only son. The Sears raised their children Catholic. When young, William suffered a bout of jaundice, which affected his health later in life.

As a young adult during the Great Depression in the United States, Sears worked as a playwright under the name Bernard Sears, winning some awards in 1933. Some of his plays were published in 1935/36, including Dad Cashes In, which has many of Sears' biographical aspects, and one play which was produced.

The plays did not generate enough income for him to continue writing full-time, so Sears got what would be his first job in a long career in broadcasting, at WOMT in Manitowoc, Wisconsin. His young wife, Kathleen Sears, died during the Depression, leaving him with their two young sons, William and Michael. Sears remarried, and he and his new wife, Marguerite Reimer Sears, raised the boys together.

=== Second marriage and the Baháʼí Faith ===
William met Marguerite in Milwaukee, Wisconsin, when he attended the University of Wisconsin, and she Marquette University. She had only recently joined the Baháʼí Faith, hearing about it from her father after a meeting Mary Maxwell, wife of a prominent Baháʼís leader. Their relationship advanced but they did not immediately marry. William was working in Iowa for the now former WGRR radio station of Radio Dubuque. On the way to California for a job with KFBK (AM) the couple considered living in Utah because it was a goal area for the religion. They ended up living in Salt Lake City in spring 1939, (apparently as their contribution to Shoghi Effendi's call for Baháʼís to relocate to support the religion) where he was soon assistant manager of KUTA radio station (later KNRS (AM).)

When they decided to marry, Marguerite and William's wedding was arranged in San Francisco by Marion Holley during their visit out there for a radio broadcast Sears did in September 1940. Between them, there were two clear understandings. On her part, it was that the religion was a prominent part of her life, and he would have to work with it being a priority for her — affecting, for example, where they would live. On his side, it was that he had a year-old son with tuberculosis, and he needed someone to help care for him. Marguerite left the Baháʼí book The Dawn-Breakers out for him to read. After picking it up and setting it aside once, he read it three times in three weeks and by December 1939 was avowedly a Baháʼí, officially joining the religion in 1940.

Sears and Marguerite moved to San Mateo, California, about the summer of 1942, where a Baháʼí Spiritual Assembly had lapsed, and he gave an especially noted talk about using radio to promote the religion. In San Mateo, they were visible giving talks on the religion as late as February 1944. He embarked on a national tour in 1945, beginning with talks in the New York City area in February. Then, after a break, he gave another 48 talks across August and September through Salt Lake City, Laramie, Denver, Omaha, Topeka, Kansas City, Independence, Milwaukee, Omaha, and into Canada in November, as well as Charlottetown. He was back in New York in December, giving a talk, and participated in a statewide conference of Baháʼís. During this period he was also on a committee that consulted on the religion's use of radio along with Mildred Mottahedeh, prominently appeared at a peace banquet with Dorothy Beecher Baker (also a future Hand of the Cause), gave talks in 1946 at a meeting back in Los Angeles with scholar Marzieh Gail, and helped produce a higher-profile radio segment in Denver. There is a gap in public coverage of any talks for the religion from 1946 until 1952, though his behind-the-scenes work continued and began to weave into his rising profile in the public eye and his service to the religion.

==== Rising to national awareness ====
As early as 1946, Sears was more noticeable in public, working for various radio and television stations. He worked at WPEN AM radio, and by 1948 at WCAU-TV, in Philadelphia, Pennsylvania. In between, in February 1947, Marguerite led a class in radio production at Green Acre Baháʼí School in Maine for which Sears acted as narrator and consultant before it airing on WHEB, and by June Sears produced a set of radio spot announcements and national radio shows for the religion. For commercial work he did various shows including The Bill Sears Show, while at the same time, his first booklet publication came out: The Martyr-Prophet of a World Faith, a 19-page work with quotes from A. L. M. Nicholas, Francis Younghusband, E. G. Browne, and then he worked for the WCAU show Kid Gloves, while at the same time Sears taped an interview of Hand of the Cause Corinne True about her pilgrimage in 1907. In December 1951 he began to host a television show In The Park initially on WCAU as a 15-minute program, which was picked up by WCBS-TV as a 30-minute live program. It featured conversations between Sears and puppets by Paul Ritts and Mary Donnelly with "… Sears (dressed in suit jacket, vest, string tie, and hat) as he sat leisurely on a bench and conversed with his puppet friends" in the Central Park Zoo. In July 1952 the show was advertised as costing $3250 to produce per week. At the same time as the show was coming along, Sears was included in a profile of thinkers by Edward R. Murrow in his This I Believe radio series though none of the participants were allowed to name their religion, (the series published as a book, with Sears' entry on pp. 167–8, and released on the internet c. 2005.) Sears began to give more public talks for the religion covered in the newspapers, beginning with a funeral in Maine in the summer of 1952. The Ten Year Crusade, a major initiative to bring the religion to countries around the world, was announced in October and would soon figure prominently in the Sears' plans. In the Park was noted in many newspaper stories in December 1952 related to The Ed Sullivan Show, and actually appeared twice on the show — January and March 1953. Coverage of In the Park continued into May. Meanwhile, he was attending the May 2 dedication of the Baháʼí House of Worship in Wilmette. Progress in organizing the efforts of the Ten Year Crusade included the opportunity for Marguerite to attend the February conference of Baháʼís in Uganda. When Sears asked to leave his contract so he could go to Africa he was threatened with the fact that 56 people would lose their jobs. Meanwhile, the sponsor had a strike, canceled the contract, and the family left. The puppets went on to other shows.

==== South Africa ====
Arriving about July 18, Sears, his wife, and one of their children moved near Johannesburg, South Africa, on an initial six-month visa. They had intended to move on to Kenya, but they stayed in South Africa. This was during the period of Apartheid and just as some new laws segregating people were coming into play: Reservation of Separate Amenities Act and the Bantu Education Act. Sears suffered a heart attack a few days into their stay. After recovering, they stayed in Kampala, Uganda, at the home of Hand of the Cause Músá Banání just after Enoch Olinga left for Cameroon. In April 1954 the Sears went on Baháʼí pilgrimage, with quick stops by Marguerite in the States sharing that pioneering doesn't magically transform someone, and on return, their other son also moved to South Africa. Sears commented about what he learned on pilgrimage including that an attitude of service in pioneering:

"Over and over again these general principles were reiterated: pioneers going to Africa must efface themselves, they must realize that in going to Africa they go to teach the native African people, not the Europeans or others who have migrated there. Pioneers must show by actions, not by words alone, that they love the Africans and have come to Africa to serve them and show their love for them.… and (reporting the words of Shoghi Effendi) "to select those taught carefully, teach them thoroughly, strengthen them in their understanding. Give them the message in such a way as to create in them a desire to teach. Then the task is accomplished. Then let the whites disperse."

After returning from pilgrimage, the Sears moved back to South Africa where they bought a farm. They helped elect the local assembly of Johannesburg, and he was appointed to the Auxiliary Board for Africa, under Hand of the Cause Músá Banání. Sears gained a job with the South African Broadcasting Corporation pre-recording radio programs, and using the free time for trips to support the religion. There was another brief trip to North America – Sears was in Canada possibly while adjusting passports for a longer stay, and gave a talk, while Marguerite was in Illinois. Returned in 1956, Sears was elected as chairman of the new regional assembly for the geographic region of South and West Africa. There were many trips he embarked on. Sears drove into Zulu territory seeking out a pioneer with John Quigley, and also managed a quick trip to the States for a July televised program on the religion for a Chicago educational television station where he served as an off-camera announcer as well as one of the interviewees. However, a new law in South Africa, the Industrial Conciliation Act, 1956, set a standard that organizations with membership of more than one race could only have one race governing the group. The Baháʼís chose to elect only black African leadership. While in South Africa circa September 1957, Sears finished off the preface to his first book – Release the Sun. Sears was briefly in the States in October, before returning to South Africa, and learning he was appointed a Hand of the Cause by Shoghi Effendi, along with Enoch Olinga and John Robarts, with responsibilities for West and South Africa. The telegram arrived late in October from Músá Banání, just before Shoghi Effendi died November 4.

=== Hand of the Cause ===
==== Crisis of the death of Shoghi Effendi ====
With the death of Shoghi Effendi the Hands of the Cause of God, now with its newest appointees, decided a select group would be voted on to act at the Baháʼí World Centre for the interests of the religion between the period of the leadership of Shoghi Effendi and promised election of the Universal House of Justice at the end of the Ten Year Crusade in 1963. These were called Custodians. In 1958 Sears attended the election of the French national assembly. During this period the Sears were apart for about a year until she was able to live in Haifa and then they traveled further together. Meanwhile, one of their sons had married and stayed in Africa.

Sears next appears in news in the States is 1959 following a redistribution of responsibilities and attended the national convention of the US community along with Corinne True and Horace Holley. He then undertook a long tour of talks across the United States and into Canada through to Spring 1960. He interrupted his tour in September having already reached more than 2000 Baháʼís across more than a hundred meetings. Starting in June Sears wrote several telegrams reacting to the decision of fellow Hand of the Cause Mason Remey to call himself Guardian which initiated a Baháʼí division. But this claim was almost universally rejected by the body of the Baháʼís and that group later broke into several other divisions, and dwindled away. In October 1959 Sears released a number of tapes as well as scripts individuals could use to make their own presentations for a number of occasions, and a tape of his was used in an inter-racial meeting in Durham NC the same month. Meanwhile, in July 1960 Hand of the Cause Horace Holley, who had been elected to act as a Custodian, died. Sears was named by the Hands to fill his place. Sears also released his autobiographical God Loves Laughter. He then continued the tour into Latin America, Central America, the Greater Antilles and northern South American countries by July 1960.

==== Tours in service ====
===== Finishing the Crusade =====
Sears was one of the signatories to a letter urging the Baháʼís of the west to continue the work for the crusade. Sears' travels continued from December 1960 starting in Alaska and then into California before proceeding widely through the rest of the U.S. and on into spring 1961. And taped talks of his begin to circulate.

There was special coverage of Sears helping to dedicate the Baháʼí House of Worship in Uganda in January 1961. Sears' most famous book, Thief in the Night, was then published. It followed biographical elements of his interest in the history of the Báb. His books began to be discussed at meetings; this continued through the years.

In the spring Sears visited the Panamanian Baháʼís, attended the national convention of Guatemala as well as visiting the newly elected International Baháʼí Council, a precursor to the Universal House of Justice. While there he was a co-signatory to a letter to the Baháʼís of Australia in their efforts in the concluding years of the crusade. In 1962 he visited at the University of Urbana-Champaign and then participated in a radio program on WLS (AM) in Chicago before attending that year's U. S. national convention (where he advocated for easing enrollment conditions that were then common practice and shared prayers in an African language,) and then the French Baháʼí summer school.

In 1963 he attended the conclave of the Hands of the Cause in Haifa anticipating the election of the Universal House of Justice to be the new head of the religion and sent a taped message to an all-Indian council of Baháʼís held near Tucson. Sears was in London for the first Baháʼí World Congress, which elected the Universal House of Justice. Sears spoke at the second evening giving a public address.

===== Under the Universal House of Justice =====
Sears spent some years overseas from America but in 1965 Sears was covered in various newspapers — Associated Press religion writer George W. Cornell wrote a piece on the religion including interviewing him. His book Release the Sun was included by the Baháʼís in donating to President JFK's Memorial Library, and echoed elsewhere. He was interviewed on WBBY, and present at different community meetings in the California area. In late January 1966 the Baháʼís organized a major conference in Fresno, California. Nine days, with a talk a day, were scheduled with Lisa Montell, Mildred Mottahedeh, Arthur Dahl, Florence Mayberry, William Sears, Russell Garcia, Gina Valentine, Eulalia Bobo, Sookha Winters, and Chester Khan. In February Sears released a series of tapes discussing ideals and importance about contributions to the religion. In May a conference of two Hands of the Cause, Sears and Zikr'u'llah Khadem, several of their auxiliary board members, and a representative of the national assembly, consulted in Waukesha, Wisconsin, and Sears was interviewed on the NBC Today Show on May 23.

He was overseas from America for much of 1967–8, starting with attending the election of a regional assembly in west central Africa. In 1968 Sears was at a centennial of Baháʼu'lláh's arrival at the prison of Akka in 1868 with 9 other Hands of the Cause and some 2300 Baháʼís at a conference in Palermo, Sicily before going to Haifa as a group. He then toured Baháʼí communities in the United Kingdom. In December he helped dedicate a new Baháʼí center in San Bernardino, California followed by attending several of the series of conferences arranged by the newly formed institution of the Continental Counsellors held across North America at Quebec, Ontario, Georgia, Pennsylvania, California, Missouri, Saskatchewan and British Columbia into March 1969. In April he attended the US National Baháʼí Convention, speaking several times, and in September Sears helped dedicate a new Baháʼí center at Desert Hot Springs, California. Meanwhile, God Loves Laughter was included in donations to a library and taped talks of his were used for a youth conference in Australia and Honduras in 1968.

In 1970 Sears attended a statewide conference in February in Bradenton, Florida, and another tape of a talk of his was sent to a youth conference in Indiana and a summer school in Seattle in June, however Sears was actually out of the country. In May he attended the French national convention and in August an (Indian) oceanic conference in Mauritius on the way to a task assigned by the Universal House of Justice. It had requested that Sears tour Iran with Marguerite, and their travels were aided by the Iranian National Spiritual Assembly, several of whom were to disappear in a few years. They were able to visit many sites important in the History of the Baháʼí Faith — the homes of the Báb and Baháʼu'lláh, the site of the Conference of Badasht, the Siyah-Chal, the fortress of Maku, the site of the Battle of Fort Tabarsi, and the place of the Báb's execution — all despite various levels of harassment. Sears published The Prisoner and the Kings following this trip. His next Baháʼí event was the Naw-Ruz opening of the Baháʼí new year celebration in a number of events in Los Angeles in March, despite the troubles of the February 1971 San Fernando earthquake, drawing participants from New Mexico, Nevada and Arizona. The talks and slides of the event were recorded. While he was away in Iran a taped message was presented at the US national convention, a general discussion tape on spiritual assemblies as an institution of the religion was released, again Sears' God Loves Laughter was donated to a library and a tape of a talk of his was used in a public meeting in Indiana.

In Spring 1971 he sent a taped message to the US national convention while he was aboard ship underway to the national convention of Jamaica, and another for the May conference of the Caribbean in Jamaica while he was at the national convention in Germany, and then a German national youth symposium. Following events in South Carolina, wherein thousands of people were beginning to join the religion Sears released a pair of hour-long taped discussions on the subject of mass engagement with and response of the public. He appeared personally in December at an awards program in California. In 1972 he again sends a tape to the US national convention, a letter to the national convention in Chad, and one to the combined convention of Swaziland and Mozambique – this time he was away for the election of the new national assembly of Ireland. In October he sent a taped message to the dedication of the new institute named after Louis G. Gregory in South Carolina.

1973 represents an active year again – he published a biography of Lua Getsinger, gave talks at several meetings around South Carolina in January at the Louis Gregory Institute, addressed the delegates to the third international convention, the US national convention, and the third annual youth convention of the US (held in June in Oklahoma at which some 4000 Baháʼís attended.) In December he helped set up the first officially Baháʼí television series, appearing in it as well as Mr. and Mrs. Russell Garcia. It was carried by an ABC affiliate in Hawaii. In Spring 1974 he attended the national convention in Japan and met Baháʼís in South Korea at a conference. In July he attended the dedication of the Bosch Baháʼí School in Santa Cruz, California. In August he had two major appearances: in early August he appeared an international youth conference in Hilo, Hawaii and in late August he was at a musical program with Russell Garcia and Seals and Crofts in Illinois.

In 1975 he started in January in New York, and then the US national convention in April. However he was unable to attend a conference in Montreal due to deterioration in his health such that he had to stop his appearances for a time. He sent a letter to an Alaskan conference in September. He was able to appear at one of the two conferences of Baháʼís in California in December.

The television series he had worked on in Hawaii in 1973 had been taped and was made available in 1976 and was aired in Alaska. He attended the Canadian national convention of Baháʼís, bringing to the US convention a gift of roses in honor of Charlotte Linfoot who had just sustained a serious stroke, and then an Alaskan conference in July. In October he was in Nairobi Kenya for an international conference of Baháʼís.

Following the Islamic Revolution in Iran and the treatment of Baháʼís Sears wrote A Cry from the Heart: The Baháʼís in Iran. Meanwhile, some of his earlier books were donated to libraries or given away. His A Cry from the Heart was included in testimony to the US Congress about events in Iran and donated to a library in 1982. In 1983 George Plagenz took an interest in the analysis Sears did of Christian prophecies (without naming Thief in the Night) and it is carried in a few cities over time. He addressed the US national convention and his comments were recorded.

==== Final years ====
The Sears moved to Tucson in 1985 in part for his health as the climate was better for him. He published All Flags Flying to tell anecdotes from his travels. In 1986 he attended the dedication of the Lotus Temple and gave a talk that has been recorded. The Sears' then began a project establishing Desert Rose Baháʼí School which had its first meetings in 1988. Despite having developed prostate cancer, in 1991 Sears initiated his last major project – he began to tour five cities of the United States and then extended the tour to nine more. But Sears died before reaching the eighth goal city, on the morning of March 25, 1992. Along the way he published Run to Glory! with anecdotes of his life fictionalized and humorous. He also had notes of works not published that were finished and published – In Grandfather's Barn and The Half-Inch Prophecy. He is buried in East Lawn Palms Cemetery in Tucson, Arizona.

Marguerite died in 2006.

== Thief in the Night ==
Sears' book Thief in the Night, or, The Strange Case of the Missing Millennium deals with the history and understandings of prophecies in relation to the Báb and includes references to number of issues from the 1844 Edict of Toleration, William Miller's work on prophecy and the Millerism movement, the resulting Great Disappointment as it was understood in the West, and the history of the Bahá'í Faith in Persia. It provides an alternate understanding of Christian Scriptures that challenges current Christian thought on each of the issues brought up (it can be considered that there is a unanimity about such matters within the Christian faith), while the book presents a Baháʼí understanding on these various themes.

Between 1961 and 1997 it was reprinted 20 times and is still labeled "a classic" book and is still cited in PhD theses as a resource. It "has remained one of the best selling of all Baha'i books since it was first published in 1961." The book has been noted by many Baháʼís: Dizzy Gillespie and friends including Flora Purim, and several writers on diverse themes.

== Remembrances ==
- Edward R. Murrow said of him:"…who, we venture to emphasize, hasn't limited his talents to the coverage of a ball game or tennis match, but has put in some fruitful time studying the struggle of life itself and the rules it is best played by."
- On the Rooftop with Bill Sears play about the life of Sears.
- Bill Sears, Kevin McCloud, Taylor Hayward, Lena Selyanina. Remember Bill Sears (audio). Bahai-Library.com.
- In 2010, he was honored at the Dawn Breakers International Film Festival for achieving excellence as a professional media personality.

== Bibliography of writings ==
=== Plays ===
- Dad Cashes in (under "Bernard Sears")
- The Cardigan kid; a comedy in 1 act ( under "William B. Sears")
- William B. Sears (1936). The Undoing of Albert O'Donnell: A Comedy in One Act. Dramatic Publishing Company.

=== Books ===
- Sears, W. (1995) [1957]. Release the Sun. US: Baháʼí Publishing Trust. ISBN 0-87743-003-9.
- Sears, William (1960). God Loves Laughter. Oxford, UK: George Ronald. ISBN 0-85398-019-5.
- Sears, William (2002) [1961]. Thief in the Night. Oxford, UK: George Ronald. ISBN 0-85398-008-X.
- William Sears (2007). The Prisoner and the Kings: How One Man Changed the Course of History (revised 2nd ed.). Baha'i Publishing Trust. ISBN 978-1-931847-41-4.
  - (revised from Sears, William (1971). Prisoner and the Kings, The. US: Baháʼí Publishing Trust. ISBN 1-931847-41-X.)
- William Sears; Robert Quigley (1973). The Flame: The Story of Lua. Oxford, UK: George Ronald. ISBN 0-85398-030-6.
- Sears, William (1982). A Cry from the Heart: The Baháʼís of Iran. Oxford, UK: George Ronald. ISBN 0-85398-134-5.
- Sears, William (1985). All Flags Flying. NSA of the Baháʼís of South Africa. ISBN 0-908420-62-5.
- Sears, William (1988). Prince of Peace. India: Baháʼí Publishing Trust. ISBN 81-85091-10-2.
- Sears, William (1991). The Wine of Astonishment. Oxford, UK: George Ronald. ISBN 0-85398-009-8.
- Sears, William (1991). Run to Glory. Naturegraph Publishers Inc. ISBN 0-87961-195-2.
- (post-humously) Sears, William (1997). In Grandfather's Barn. US: Baháʼí Publishing Trust. ISBN 0-87743-257-0.
- (post-humously) Sears, William (2000). The Half-Inch Prophecy. NSA of the Baháʼís of South Africa. ISBN 1-874801-94-0.
