= Baháʼí Faith in Rwanda =

The Baháʼí Faith in Rwanda begins after 1916 with a mention by ʻAbdu'l-Bahá, then head of the religion, that Baháʼís should take the religion to the regions of Africa. The first specific mention of Rwanda was in May 1953 suggesting the expanding community of the Baháʼí Faith in Uganda look at sending pioneers to neighboring areas like Ruanda. The first settlers of the religion arrived in the region by July 1953 when Baháʼís from the United States and Malawi arrived. By 1963 there were three Baháʼí Local Spiritual Assemblies in Burundi-Ruanda. Through succeeding organizations of the countries in the region, the National Spiritual Assembly of Rwanda was formed in 1972. Baháʼís, perhaps in the thousands, were among those who perished in the Rwandan genocide Following the disruption of the Rwandan Civil War the national assembly was reformed in 1997. The Baháʼís of Rwanda have continued to strive for inter-racial harmony, a teaching which Denyse Umutoni, an assistant director of Shake Hands with the Devil, mentions as among the reasons for her conversion to the religion. 2001 estimates place the Baháʼí population around 15000 while 2005 estimates from the same source shows just over 18,900.

== Early days ==
=== ʻAbdu'l-Bahá's Tablets of the Divine Plan ===
ʻAbdu'l-Bahá wrote a series of letters, or tablets, to the followers of the religion in the United States in 1916–1917; these letters were compiled together in the book titled Tablets of the Divine Plan. Three of the tablets mentioned taking the Baháʼí Faith to Africa, but was delayed in being presented in the United States until 1919 — after the end of World War I and the Spanish flu. These tablets were translated and presented by Mirza Ahmad Sohrab on April 4, 1919, and published in Star of the West magazine on December 12, 1919. One tablet says in part:

The intention of the teacher must be pure, his heart independent, his spirit attracted, his thought at peace, his resolution firm, his magnanimity exalted and in the love of God a shining torch.… Consequently, a number of souls may arise … and hasten to all parts of the world, especially from America to Europe, Africa, Asia ….

(and also offers a prayer that begins) O God, my God! Thou seest how black darkness is enshrouding all regions, how all countries are burning with the flame of dissension, and the fire of war and carnage is blazing throughout the East and the West. Blood is flowing, corpses bestrew the ground, and severed heads are fallen on the dust of the battlefield.

O Lord! Have pity…

The first specific mention of Rwanda was from a telegram of Shoghi Effendi in May 1953, while he was head of the religion, in which he is suggesting the expanding community of the Baháʼí Faith in Uganda and other areas look at sending pioneers to neighboring areas like Ruanda.

=== Beginnings ===
The first Baháʼí to travel through Rwanda may have been Marthe Molitor c. 1947 after joining the religion in Belgium though she moved on to the Belgian Congo. The first settlers of the religion arrived in the region by July 1953 when Mary and Reginald (Rex) Collison from the United States and Dunduzu Chisiza, a young Baháʼí from Malawi (then Nyasaland), arrived in Ruanda-Urundi (now the independent countries of Rwanda and Burundi) thus earning the title Knights of Baháʼu'lláh. The first local Baháʼí in Rwanda was Alphonse Semanyenzi. By 1963 there were three Baháʼí Local Spiritual Assemblies in Burundi-Ruanda, though the host cities were not specified owing to difficulties of communication with Baháʼí administration. Prominent early pioneers were Dr. Ataollah Taaid and his wife Zahereh came in 1966.

== Growth ==
The regional National Spiritual Assembly of Central and East Africa was established in 1956, with its seat in Kampala, and embraced Uganda, Tanganyika, Kenya, Belgian Congo, Ruanda-Urundi, and other areas. Hand of the Cause Enoch Olinga represented the Universal House of Justice for the 1969 election of the National Spiritual Assembly of the Baháʼís of Burundi and Rwanda with its seat in Bujumbura. With the independence of Burundi and Rwanda, the National Assembly was reformed in 1972 for each country. Hand of the Cause Rúhíyyih Khanum visited Rwanda in 1972 and 1973 about when the community was officially recognized by the national government.

Baháʼís, perhaps in the thousands, were among the 800,000 who perished in the Rwandan genocide as well as at least one Baháʼí American-Rwandan family that helped rescue refugees. The National Spiritual Assembly of Rwanda lapsed in 1996 following the Rwandan Civil War and was reformed in 1997.

== Modern community ==
Since its inception the religion has had involvement in socio-economic development beginning by giving greater freedom to women, promulgating the promotion of female education as a priority concern, and that involvement was given practical expression by creating schools, agricultural coops, and clinics. The religion entered a new phase of activity when a message of the Universal House of Justice dated 20 October 1983 was released. Baháʼís were urged to seek out ways, compatible with the Baháʼí teachings, in which they could become involved in the social and economic development of the communities in which they lived. Worldwide in 1979 there were 129 officially recognized Baháʼí socio-economic development projects. By 1987, the number of officially recognized development projects had increased to 1482. Since the genocide and war, the religion has been involved in resolving tribal tensions based on its teachings of principle of the oneness of humanity. In March 2000, the national assembly of Rwanda released a statement addressed to the National Commission for Unity and Reconciliation, in which the Baháʼís urged that consideration be given to making the principle of the oneness of humanity the basis for reconciliation in the country. Some Baháʼís from the United States have set up a non-profit organization, Orien Aid, to finding, empowering, and training youth for service, and also made a five-year commitment to work in Rwanda starting in 2003. Among the recent conversions is Denyse Umutoni, an assistant director of Shake Hands with the Devil, national coordinator of a public awareness program on social issues called Cineduc (Youth Education Through Cinema), a project funded by DED and UNICEF, she set up after she organized the retrieval of 3000 bodies, including her parents, from a mass grave in 2004. Umutoni was raised Catholic but experienced a crisis of faith but her study of the teachings of the Baháʼí Faith renewed her spirit. Rwandan Baháʼí youth were among those gathered for a five-day conference in 2006 in Bujumbura to discuss how youth can provide the means for peaceful social action and transformation.

=== Demographics ===
There is an estimate the Baháʼí community was 40,000 before the genocide but more recently there appear to be about 10,000. The World Christian Database (WCD) 2001. In 2005 there were 28 local spiritual assemblies. The 2005 WCD estimate was of just over 18900 Baháʼís.

== See also ==
- History of Rwanda
- Religion in Rwanda
