= Baháʼí Faith in Malawi =

The Baháʼí Faith in Malawi began before the country achieved independence. Before World War I the area of modern Malawi was part of Nyasaland and ʻAbdu'l-Bahá, then head of the religion, asked the followers of the Baháʼí Faith to travel to the regions of Africa. As part of a wide scale growth in the religion across Sub-Saharan Africa the religion was introduced into this region when an early African Baháʼí traveled from Tanganyika in 1952 followed in 1953 by Baháʼís from Iran the same year it became known as the Federation of Rhodesia and Nyasaland. A decade later there were five Baháʼí Local Spiritual Assemblies. By 1970, now in the country of Malawi, there were 12 Local Spiritual Assemblies and a National Spiritual Assembly. In 2003 Baháʼís estimated their membership at 15000 while the 2001 World Christian Encyclopedia estimated the membership at 24500 and in 2005 revised their estimate to about 36000.

== Early history ==
In the first decade of the 1900s, the region of Malawi was part of Nyasaland. In a series of letters, or tablets, to the followers of the religion in the United States and Canada in 1916-1917 by ʻAbdu'l-Bahá, then head of the religion, asked the followers of the religion to travel to regions of Africa; these letters were compiled together in the book titled Tablets of the Divine Plan. The publication was delayed until 1919 in Star of the West magazine on December 12, 1919. after the end of World War I and the Spanish flu.

Wide scale growth in the religion across Sub-Saharan Africa was observed to begin in 1950s and extend in the 1960s. Particular plans to bring the religion to Uganda began in 1950 involving the cooperation of American, British, Egyptian, and Persian Baháʼí communities and reached a level of coordination and detail that materials were translated into languages widely used in Africa before pioneers reached Africa. In 1952 in the region of Malawi, then about to become the Federation of Rhodesia and Nyasaland, the Baháʼí Faith enters when Dennis Dudley-Smith Kutendele (sometimes Kutendere), the first African Baháʼí in Tanganyika, and member of Dar es Salaam's first local spiritual assembly, moved to Zomba with his family - the first time an African Baháʼí took the religion to a new country. He was soon joined by pioneer Enayat Sohaili and his family from Iran. As Sohaili was white and Kutendere black it was illegal for them to socialize. So the first Baháʼí Feast they held was meeting in the bush at night. This same year new convert Dunduzu Chisiza left Malawi to help introduce the religion to Rwanda (formerly part of Ruanda-Urundi). In 1956 the area of Malawi was included in the regional National Spiritual Assembly of South and West Africa. John William Allen was the first Auxiliary Board of the region working under Hand of the Cause Músá Baníní.

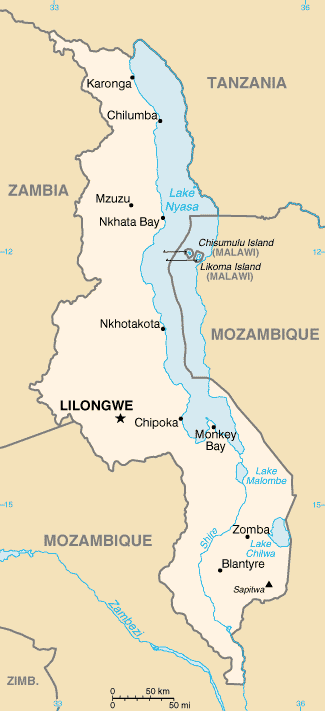
Map of Malawi

In 1960 twenty-six Africans and ten white Baháʼís representing five language groups attended a second regional seminar in Salisbury S. Rhodesia on the progress of the religion with attendees from S. Rhodesia, N. Rhodesia, Nyasaland, Mozambique, and South Africa. Classes included "Baha'i Character Development," "How to Give a Baha'i Talk," and "The Covenants of God". Two local conferences in Nyasaland also took place in 1960.

== Growth ==
By 1963 there were Baháʼí Local Spiritual Assemblies in Balaka, Balila, Bawi, Limbe, and Mianje. There were smaller groups of Baháʼís in Chileka, Chipoka, Chiradzulo, Lilongwe, Mzimba, Mzuzu, Sharpevale, and Zomba. There were individual Baháʼís in Chibwawa, Dedza, Fort Johnston (now known as Mangochi), and Karonga. In 1964 the first Baháʼí marriage service was performed in the country; the same year as the independence of the country now called Malawi. An interim re-organization pooled a regional national assembly of South Central Africa, which comprised the countries of Botswana, Malawi and Rhodesia in 1967. By 1970 there were 12 Local Spiritual Assemblies, enough for the country to have its own National Spiritual Assembly, which was elected in the presence of Hand of the Cause Paul Haney. The next year Hand of the Cause Enoch Olinga asked for official registration of the religion, a request met by President Hastings Banda. Three from Malawi attended the first Baháʼí youth summer school for southern Africa was held in Swaziland in December, 1971 through the 2nd of January, 1972. Land for a national center was acquired in 1972 and the number local assemblies had reached 23. In 1972 and 1982 Hand of the Cause Rúhíyyih Khanum traveled throughout the country. Her October 1972 visit included radio and print press interviews, public talks and a meeting with President Hastings Banda where she observed "in the eyes of Baha'u'llah it seems there was one thing even worse than war and this was anarchy and revolution and civil strife" when the president commented that some religious groups in Malawi had been fermenting discord and strife. She also toured into the countryside and met many Baháʼís and contributed to building funds for centers. Among her public talks she said that though African suffered tribal prejudice, racial prejudice was far worse but of which Africans were largely clear of. Among the pioneers to come to Malawi was Ireland's Frances Beard who moved there in 1974, the same year as Baháʼís from Australia also pioneered to Malawi. Since its inception the religion has had involvement in socio-economic development beginning by giving greater freedom to women, promulgating the promotion of female education as a priority concern, and that involvement was given practical expression by creating schools, agricultural coops, and clinics. The religion entered a new phase of activity when a message of the Universal House of Justice dated 20 October 1983 was released. Baháʼís were urged to seek out ways, compatible with the Baháʼí teachings, in which they could become involved in the social and economic development of the communities in which they lived. Worldwide in 1979 there were 129 officially recognized Baháʼí socio-economic development projects. By 1987, the number of officially recognized development projects had increased to 1482. Malawian Baháʼís have embarked on a number of projects to support the welfare of Malawi.

=== Bambino School ===
In a commitment to education and the welfare of humanity, the Baháʼís have set up 60 grassroots Baháʼí literacy schools and 30 Baháʼí primary health care workers were trained and deployed. The largest scale institution is the private school named the Bambino School in Lilongwe. A Baháʼí school started in January 1993, in 2003 Bambino School had an enrollment of 1,100 from nursery level through secondary school and secretarial college and has high school graduation including taking the International General Certificate of Secondary Education. Andrew Nhlane is the head teacher of the high school which has 350 students alone. Students participate in international projects with other schools in Turkey, United Arab Emirates and Bulgaria. International students contribute terms of service. Kenneth Gondwe, aka Babyjinx, is a former attendee of Bambino and has gone on to be an accomplished musician, performer, and business owner running a music production company. Partial scholarships are available.

== Modern community ==
The 2003 golden jubilee of the establishment of the religion in Malawi was attended by Baháʼís from Bermuda, Australia, Mauritius, South Africa, Zambia, and Lesotho, and one of the events of the jubilee was a play based on the life and martyrdom of Mona Mahmudnizhad. The 2004 Namibian Jubilee had guests from the Malawian Baháʼí community. The Baháʼí National Center is located in Lilongwe.

In 2007 public schools began offering religious education at the primary school level. These courses had previously been available only in secondary schools. Both a Christian-oriented "Bible Knowledge" course and a "Moral and Religious Education" course, including Muslim, Hindu, Baháʼí, and Christian material are available. Individual parent-teacher associations or school committees decide which religion courses to offer.

Baháʼí delegates from 17 countries included ones from Malawi convened in New York from February – March 2008 for the 52nd session of the UN Commission on the Status of Women. Some 120 Baháʼís from Malawi attended the first of 41 conferences called for by the Universal House of Justice between November and February 2008–9 in neighboring Zambia along with Baháʼís from Zimbabwe.

=== Demographics ===
The World Christian Encyclopedia notes there may have been 18000 Baháʼís in 1990 and 24,500 in 2000 and about 36145 in 2005. In 2003 a Baháʼí source mentioned there were some 15000 Baháʼís in Malawi. A 2007 survey reports about 4% of the population of 13000000—roughly 520000—is split between Hindus, Baháʼís, Rastafarians and Jews.

== See also ==
- History of Malawi
