= Baháʼí Faith in Kenya =

The Baháʼí Faith in Kenya began with three individuals. First, Richard St. Barbe Baker took a constructive engagement with the indigenous religion of Kenyans to a United Kingdom conference on religions, where, in sympathy with his efforts, he was presented with the Baháʼí Faith and became a convert. The second individual was Enoch Olinga who traveled to Kenya when he served in the British Royal Army Educational Corps. The third came twenty-one years after the first and marked the arrival of the Baháʼí Faith in Kenya. In 1945 Mrs. Marguerite Preston (née Wellby) arrived in Kenya. She had been a member of the National Spiritual Assembly of the United Kingdom from 1939 through 1945 when she married a Kenyan tea grower and moved to Kenya where the couple had three children within two years and she was the only Baháʼí in the nation. The Association of Religion Data Archives (relying on World Christian Encyclopedia) estimated about 429,000 Baháʼís in Kenya in 2005.

== Before the coming of the Baháʼís ==
Following the events of World War I, where Richard St. Barbe Baker had served in France, St. Barbe went to Cambridge University and earned a degree in Forestry at Caius College. He then went to Kenya in 1920 to serve under the Colonial Office as Assistant Conservator of Forests. There he saw wide scale deforestation going on. St. Barbe also intervened in a case of a colonial officer against a Kikuyu worker – taking a blow aimed at the worker, which would eventually alienate him from the service. He developed a plan for re-forestation where food crops were planted between rows of young native trees. Because of lack of funds, St. Barbe consulted with the Kenyans themselves, approaching the Kikuyu Chiefs and Elders, and together they arranged for three thousand tribal warriors to come to his camp and, with the assistance of the Chiefs, fifty were selected to be the first Men of the Trees. They promised before Ngai, the High God, that they would protect the native forest, plant ten native trees each year, and take care of trees everywhere. Immediately then leaving Kenya, St. Barbe offered a paper at a Congress of Living Religions in the Commonwealth about the Bantu religion, following which he was introduced to the Baháʼí Faith because "his genuine interest in another's religion struck a sympathetic chord with the Baháʼí principles." On going to British Mandate of Palestine for pilgrimage he engaged leaders of religions in the Men of the Trees initiative, including then head of the Baháʼí Faith Shoghi Effendi, the Chancellor of the Hebrew University, the Grand Mufti of the Supreme Muslim Council as well as Orthodox and Catholic patriarchs. St. Barbe returned to Kenya briefly in 1976 when he acted as a special adviser to the Baháʼí delegation at a UN conference in Nairobi, in 1976.

In 1941 Uganda's Enoch Olinga joined the British Royal Army Educational Corps and served in Nairobi, capital of Kenya. On return to Uganda he married and encountered the Baháʼí Faith in 1951. He would later become a Knight of Baháʼu'lláh, pioneering to Cameroon, then serving on National Spiritual Assemblies and being named the youngest Hand of the Cause. For his role in waves of Knights and the pace of the expansion of the religion in Sub-Saharan Africa, he was named "Father of Victories" by Shoghi Effendi. See also Baháʼí Faith in Uganda.

== To Kenya and the growth of the community ==
=== Establishment ===
After Mrs. Marguerite Preston's arrival in Kenya in 1945 the next phase of the Baháʼí Faith in Kenya was part of the wide scale growth in the religion across Sub-Saharan Africa. There was an intensive series of plans and goals of pioneers across Sub-Saharan Africa. Particular plans to bring the religion to Uganda began in 1950 involving the cooperation of American, British, Egyptian, and Persian Baháʼí communities and reached a level of coordination and detail that materials were translated into languages widely used in Africa before most pioneers reached Africa. In 1950-1 the Baháʼís in the United Kingdom pioneered to Tanganyika, Uganda, Kenya. For example, in 1951 Ted Cardell left on 7 October as pioneer for Nairobi after the untimely death of Mrs. Preston's husband. In September 1951 youth Kimani Waiyaki is noted as visiting Green Acre Baháʼí School in the United States. Ted Cardell was perhaps the next pioneer to arrive in Kenya by April 1952. After receiving the news that Hand of the Cause Louis George Gregory had died previously on 31 July, a commemorative meeting for Gregory was held in Kampala at which Kenyan pioneers joined with those from Uganda) and twelve Africans. Mrs Preston and her eldest child were killed in a plane flight in early 1952 near Sicily. In December 1952 Persian pioneer 'Aziz Yazdi was able to settle in Nairobi and was joined by his wife and children by February 1953. Ursula Samandari, also a former member of the National Spiritual Assembly of the United Kingdom, was elected to the nine-member Local Spiritual Assembly of Nairobi in 1953. By 1955 there were eight assemblies in Kenya.

=== Growth ===
The Kenyan Baháʼí community came under the newly formed regional National Spiritual Assembly of Central & Eastern Africa in 1956, of which Nakhjavani was the chairman, and 9 more assemblies were elected in Kenya in 1957 along with three weekend schools. In Dec. 1958 – January 1959 the first seven-day school in Kenya was held near Kimilili in western Kenya covering topics on Baháʼí administration, Baháʼí history and Baháʼí teachings. Correspondence courses followed by June. By December there was progress in getting permanent centers established from among the assemblies. Extraordinary number of enrollments in Uganda and Kenya had reached the point that the institution of the Hands of the Cause were noting there were not enough Baha'is to keep up with the work of checking the enrollments. In the case of Kenya, almost nearly twelve hundred people joined the religion in less than a year. Four regional conferences on the progress of the religion and weekend schools were held by early 1960. Hand of the Cause Musa Banani was the first Hand to visit Kenya in early 1960. Nine Kenyans were among the attendees at advanced training in 1960 though classes now used chapters from Baháʼu'lláh and the New Era by John Esslemont while in November 1960 Hands of the Cause John Robarts and Rahmatu'lláh Muhájir toured Kenya leading up to the dedication of the mother Baháʼí House of Worship of Africa in Uganda in January 1961. Kenyans were among the over 1500 people who attended. Following the dedication, Hand of the Cause Ruhiyyih Khanum and chairman of the regional National Assembly Ali Nakhjavani embarked on 15 days of visiting Baháʼís through Uganda and Kenya including seeing three regional conferences on the progress of the religion, staying in homes of fellow believers, and other events. Khanum talked to audiences about the future of African Baháʼís and their role in the religion. The convention for the 1961 election of the regional national assembly of central and east Africa included 35 delegates from Kenya. In September 1961 a permanent Baháʼí school was set up in Kenya where courses emphasized homecraft and child rearing mixed with presentations on the religion and men supported women taking the courses. News of the openings was covered in Jet Magazine. By the end of 1961 conversions among pygmies brought the membership of the community to about 4000 and a total of 134 assemblies. Samandari was elected to the regional National Spiritual Assembly of North East Africa (1961–70) before moving to Cameroon where she later died. In 1962 the Kenyan government took steps to officially recognize Baháʼí holy days for employees. In May Hand of the Cause Enoch Olinga visited for one week in Kenya as part of an extended tour of many African countries. He spoke in Tiriki, Nandi, Nyangore, Kisii, Nairobi, Mombasa and Wundanyi. He then returned in August for another week's stay this time in Kabras. In October in addition to the permanent school weekend courses were offered emphasizing homecraft and child rearing mixed with presentations on the religion in Malakisi and Kimilili, while a permanent center was opened in South Kabras.

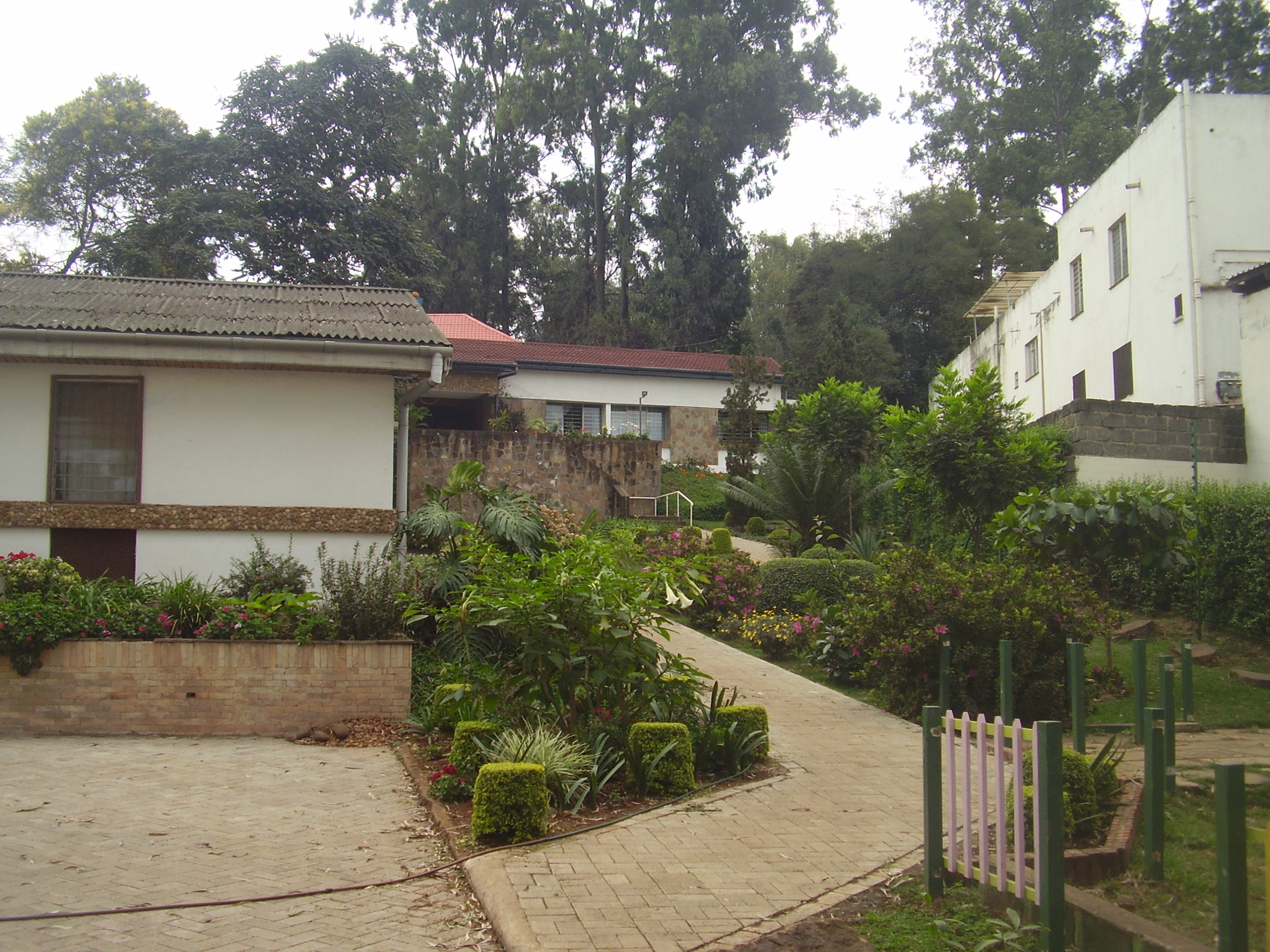
The National Baháʼí Centre (Haziratu'l-Quds) in Nairobi, Kenya.

By January 1963 the building at the Baháʼí center in Nairobi was rebuilt and planned on hosting advanced courses on the religion. In 10 years from the founding of the first local assembly, there were 118 Local Assemblies, 346 groups, and 131 isolated Baháʼís in early 1963. Locations for Assemblies included Nairobi, Kilifi, with smaller groups in locations like Bungoma, Busia, Eldoret, Embu, Kakamega, Kericho, Kisii, Kitale, Machakos, Malindi, Mombasa, Kisumu, Nyeri, Thika, Voi, Webuye, and Wundanyi. By the end of 1963 a total of 134 assemblies and 4000 Baháʼís had held steady since 1961. Upcoming for the community was the election of its own National Spiritual Assembly.

=== National organization ===
Form the founding the national assembly the Baháʼís of Kenya the growing community of Baháʼís have had a diversity of projects and activities the community have undertaken. The National Spiritual Assembly of the Baháʼís of Kenya was first elected in 1964. Its members were: James Wasilwa, Aziz Yazdi, Elamu Muswahili, Taherih Ala'i, Festas Mulkalama, Bonaventure Wafula, Julius Makanda, Frank Mnkoyani, and Christopher Musambai. From mid-December 1964 to mid-January 1965 a traveling Baháʼí from the Baháʼí World Center visited the Nairobi community and was interviewed on a national television program which lead to a public exchange on a national newspaper. In 1966 the National Assembly incorporated, took up ownership of the national center, and the Baháʼí Holy days were registered with the government. In 1967 Hand of the Cause William Sears dedicated the first teaching center for western Kenya. Henry Luke Duma, after joining the religion in 1965 gained a scholarship for attending college in Mississippi, USA, where he took active part in promulgating the religion. In March 1969 members of the national print media attended a public information gathering with talks and receptions following which articles were printed in English and Swahili and in June the National Assembly of the Baháʼís of Kenya were invited to the Madaraka Day observance by the office of the President of Kenya. In August Hand of the Cause Rúhíyyih Khanum toured Kenya and neighboring countries for an extended visit during which she met with Baháʼís individually and collectively at regional conferences and civic leaders and was interviewed on a television program. After progressing with the tour in other countries she returned in mid-November where she met with more Baháʼís and also dedicated Baháʼí centers. In 1972 Baháʼís organized displays at an All-Africa trade show and held a March youth conference in Nakuru. The youth conference was repeated in August. In early October 1972 Ruhiyyih Khánum and Violette Nakbjavani returned to Kenya after two trips across Africa – arriving in Mombasa and then stayed at week in Nairobi again with meetings for Baha'is and journalists. A one-day conference was quickly assembled for youth. From Kenya they traveled to Malawi and on until their return in spring 1973. At that time they traveled for three weeks through the north east section of Kenya including Maralal, Lake Rudolf, and Marsabit before returning to Nairobi. In 1973 the National Spiritual Assembly of Kenya produced a songbook – "Tuimbe Pamoja, Baadhi ya Nyimbo za Baha'i". Following the convention for electing the national assembly in 1974 a national conference presented opportunities for participants from across Kenya to discuss a number of topics and classes were held on the role of the local assembly.

== External and internal developments ==
From the mid-1970s the community formed more complex development with external and internal orientations.

=== Involvement in external development projects ===
From around 1975 the Baháʼí community began to be involved in initiatives and programs for the betterment of the broader society.

- In April 1975 a representative of the Baháʼí International Community offered a paper on the role of some Baháʼí teachings in regards to the environment to the International Assembly of Non-Governmental Organizations concerned with the Environment held in Nairobi.
- In September 1975 Catherine Mboya, an African Baháʼí from Nairobi, treasurer of the Nairobi Baháʼí Assembly, a professional accountant and student of University of Nairobi, an officer of Maendeleo Ya Wanawake, and international vice president of the Associated Country Women of the World, was part of the delegation of Baháʼís to the International Women's Year World Conference.
- During the Decade for Women, 1976–86, with the continuing growth of the Kenyan community, as the population applied the Baháʼí teachings there was an effect on the social position of women – "a key factor in the involvement and participation of women," "more women serving on both appointed and elected Baháʼí institutions".
- The national assembly appointed a Women's Committee in 1977 to cooperate with the Regional UNICEF office in Nairobi and the Kenyan government and other NGOs in a pilot project called "Water for Health" initiated by the UNICEF/NGO Subcommittee on Women and Development. The 1979 convention for electing the national assembly had 105 delegates.
- In early 1980, partly in support of the International Year of the Child, Kenyan Baháʼís established two tutorial Baháʼí schools after a conference on education for Baháʼí children. One was in Nakuru and the other in Mombasa. In support of Kenya's Year of the Handicapped, the Mombasa spiritual assembly sponsored an art contest and contributed reading materials to the "Ziwani School for the Deaf" and visited the "Port Reitz School for the Disabled" and showed a filmstrip.
- In 1981 a Baháʼí pioneer in Africa since 1970 began teaching a unit on the religion as part of a class through the Department of Philosophy and Religious Studies at Kenyatta University in Nairobi. In 1983 a formulation of this work was added to survey classes for masters students of teaching degrees to include 10 hrs of lecture on the Baháʼí and Bábí faiths.
- In 1982 Baháʼís near Mombasa became involved with an NGO project to conserve fuel wood. Later the community was invited to an agro-forestry course involving making improved charcoal burners: the Kenya Ceramic Jiko.
- In 1983 two Baháʼí professors gathered students and staff from the Kenya Science Teachers College for a presentation on the religion which ran over the allotted time.
- In 1984 and 1985 a number of projects began –
  - Baháʼí coffee growers established a bank account and 1/3 of proceeds from their sales to go to the account which was then used for community activities.
  - A literacy campaign was initiated in the Malinda region.
  - Two nursery schools, a pre-primary school, and a teacher training center were operating by 1985.
  - The Kenya Ceramic Jiko project was still ongoing through 1985.
- The Decade for Women was capped by a UN International conference in Nairobi in 1985 which included some 55 Baháʼís. There were 10 official delegates composed of 3 Counselors and other Baháʼís from the US, Canada, 2 from Africa including Catherine Mboya. The national assembly arranged for tours of relevant Baháʼí projects in the area.
- In 1989 the Baháʼís of Kenya cooperated with the Canadian Public Health Association in an immunization campaign and it was extended with local meetings in Manawanga and Lugula 1990.

=== Continued internal development ===
==== General development ====
While projects oriented to society at large took form internal oriented development continued.

In January 1975 the Baháʼís of Nakuru finished their center and its beautifications. In June youth organized an information booth at an agricultural show. In 1978-9 George Olinga, a son of Enoch Olinga, moved to Kenya and in September 1979 became one of the few surviving members of the family. In 1984 the Malindi region of Coast Province was the fastest growing in conversions to the religion though several were growing quickly though Bungoma was among the slowest (though nearby Kakamega was on the high side.) In 1985 the extension goal of Kenya, the Baháʼís of Comoro Islands, founded by Mehraban Sohaili, a Knight of Baháʼu'lláh for the Comoro Islands, reached a population of 60 members. In 1988 a Baháʼí from Kenya toured Malawi where she gave talks to several groups of people.

==== Conventions ====
- In October 1976 an international conference for Africa on the progress of the religion was held in Nairobi- some 1300 Baháʼís from 61 countries attended and speakers included Hands of the Cause William Sears, John Robarts, Rahmatu'llah Muhájir, and Enoch Olinga, Counselor Thelma Khelgati, 'Aziz Yazdi, and member of the national assembly Catherine Mboya. There were 20 Knights of Baháʼu'lláh attending. The conference attendees received messages from the Universal House of Justice and was welcomed to Kenya by government minister N. W. Munoko. 'Azidi reviewed the history of the progress of the religion in Africa from its first Bábi visitor through to the then existing 34 national assemblies. Note was taken of the difficulties in Ethiopia and Uganda both in turmoil in 1975–6. Examples of the spread of the religion in other regions of the world were reviewed driven by pioneers where a few lead to many who joined the religion. And teachings of the religion including the role of youth, the emancipation of women and importance of family life were outlined. Translations of all talks and break out sessions were held in English, French, Persian and Swahili. A Unity Feast was held the night before the opening of the conference – an accident had cut power at the conference grounds but lighting was supplied by the headlights of the busses. Publicity of the conference included coverage by newspaper and radio including the East African Standard.
- In 1981 a conference of the fourteen Counselors of the Continental Board of Counsellors for Africa opened in Nairobi, with devotions and the reading of the message from the Universal House of Justice by its representative, the Hand of the Cause, William Sears. A decision was reached to consolidate all of Africa under one board responsible for the whole of Africa. Each country would be the primary responsibility of one counsellor and secondarily of another, though all counselors were to be free to travel to any country at need.
- In 1982 the Universal House of Justice called for conference to be held in honor of the 50th anniversary of the death of Bahíyyih Khánum. The main conference for Africa was at Lagos, Nigeria, 19–22 August. However satellite conferences also occurred and one was held in Nairobi in October where more than 550 Baháʼís, mostly from rural Kenyan villages but also some from 12 African countries, attended. Pioneers organized a children's class which developed a skit presented to the audience. Hand of the Cause William Sears addressed audiences of adults and youth. The Honorable Justice Effie Owuor, the first woman justice in Kenya, also addressed the audience. Several newspapers and the radio program Voice of Kenya covered the event and interest was sustained when individuals from these news outlets also attended the Birth of the Bab holy day.
- In 1983 Baháʼí youth from Malava and Lutali gathered for classes on clearer understanding of the religion, its views on methods of promulgating the religion and standards of behavior and decided to organize formation of college Baháʼí clubs.
- In 1983 the Association for Baháʼí Studies held its 8th annual conference in Canada at which registrants from Kenya were included. In 1986 it held its 4th Baháʼí Studies Symposium for East, Central, and South Africa in Nairobi.
- In 1984 Baháʼís from Kenya were among the more than 400 delegates from 15 countries which attended a two-day Baháʼí Temple Conference for the Lotus Temple in India whose completion was nearing.
- In 1984 Nakuru Baháʼís hosted the second national Baháʼí Women's Conference where 90 women attended and heard talks from Counselor Thelma Khelghati as well as Kingsley Dube, the United Nations Information Officer for East Africa, spoke about the importance of training youth while Dr. Eddah Oachukia, chairman of the coordinating committee for the NGO Conference of the UN Decade for Women presented on the significant role the women of Kenya can play in helping to bring about equality for women.
- Regional conferences were called for by the Universal House of Justice 20 October 2008 to celebrate recent achievements in grassroots community-building and to plan their next steps in organizing in their home areas. Just two weeks later twin conferences were held – one in South Africa and the other in Kenya. One regional conference was hosted by the National Spiritual Assembly of the Baháʼís of Kenya in Nakuru in November 2008 and attracted over 1000 Baháʼís: in addition to over 500 Kenyans, there were 200 from Uganda, 100 from Tanzania, 42 from Ethiopia, four from Mozambique, and three from southern Sudan.
- The sixth annual National Baháʼí Women's Conference at the Nakuru Baha'i Centre was held in 1989 – among the events was a recording of a panel discussion that was broadcast later on national television.
- In 1989 a Baháʼí expert and businessman in using appropriate technology from Swaziland traveled through six southern and eastern African countries including Kenya training local people in the manufacture of several kinds of fence-making machines and other technologies in building, agriculture and water programs. The 10-day training courses were organized by the National Spiritual Assemblies in each of the six countries.

== Stories ==
Through the 1960s to the 1990s many well known Baháʼís lived in Kenya and many reported linking their spiritual lives with Kenya as it was when it started with St. Barbe and the Prestons.

From 1966 to 1969 well-known poet Roger White lived in Nairobi as a secretary for William and Margarite Sears and other Hands of the Cause in Africa, and also dealt with a racist theatre troupe.

Attorney Helen Elsie Austin lived in Africa as a US Foreign Service Officer from 1960 to 1970, serving as a Cultural attaché with the United States Information Agency first in Lagos, Nigeria and later in Nairobi where she was also a member of the Local Spiritual Assembly.

In 1986 North American indigenous Baháʼí Lee Brown gave a talk which was recorded and transcribed – it includes his description of being in Kenya sometime before and linked Native American, especially Hopi, prophecies with the religion of the Kikuyu tribe of Kenya.

Artist Geraldine Robarts of the United Kingdom fled the Blitz to South Africa where she grew to adulthood and became a Baháʼí. Robarts and family fled Apartheid to Uganda where she was a lecturer in the Makerere University but then fled Idi Amin, and then came to Kenya in 1972. She taught and was head of the department of Painting at Kenyatta University. Starting as early as Uganda she worked with groups of artists to have their art appear in museums and developed a project for groups of women to show case their art as well as provide a mechanism for rural development work.

In honor of the Hand of the Cause Louis George Gregory, a number of individuals in Kenya have sought to establish an Award named the Kisii Louis George Gregory Award.

== Modern community involvements and character ==
In the 1990s the Baháʼís in Kenya participated in a nationwide community health project including vaccinations, maintaining latrines and developing clean water sources. In 2005 the World Christian Database estimated the Baháʼí population at about 429,000 or about 1% of the population.

=== First local House of Worship ===
In 2012 the Universal House of Justice announced the first local Baháʼí Houses of Worship would be built. One of these was specified in Matunda Soy, Kenya and its design was revealed in April 2018.

The architect is Mrs Neda Samimi, the first woman to design a House of Worship.

== See also ==
- Demographics of Kenya
- Subdivisions of Kenya
- Category:Cities in Kenya
- Category:Towns in Western Province (Kenya)
