= Baháʼí Faith in Cameroon =

The Baháʼí Faith in Cameroon was established when the country was separated into two colonies - British and French Cameroon. The first Baháʼí in Cameroon was Enoch Olinga, who had left his homeland of Uganda to bring the religion to British Cameroon in 1953. Meherangiz Munsiff, a young Indian woman who had moved from Britain, arrived in French Cameroon April 1954 - both Olinga and Munsiff were honoured with the title Knight of Baháʼu'lláh. In 2003 Baháʼís estimated there were 40,000 adherents of the religion in the country.

== Early history ==
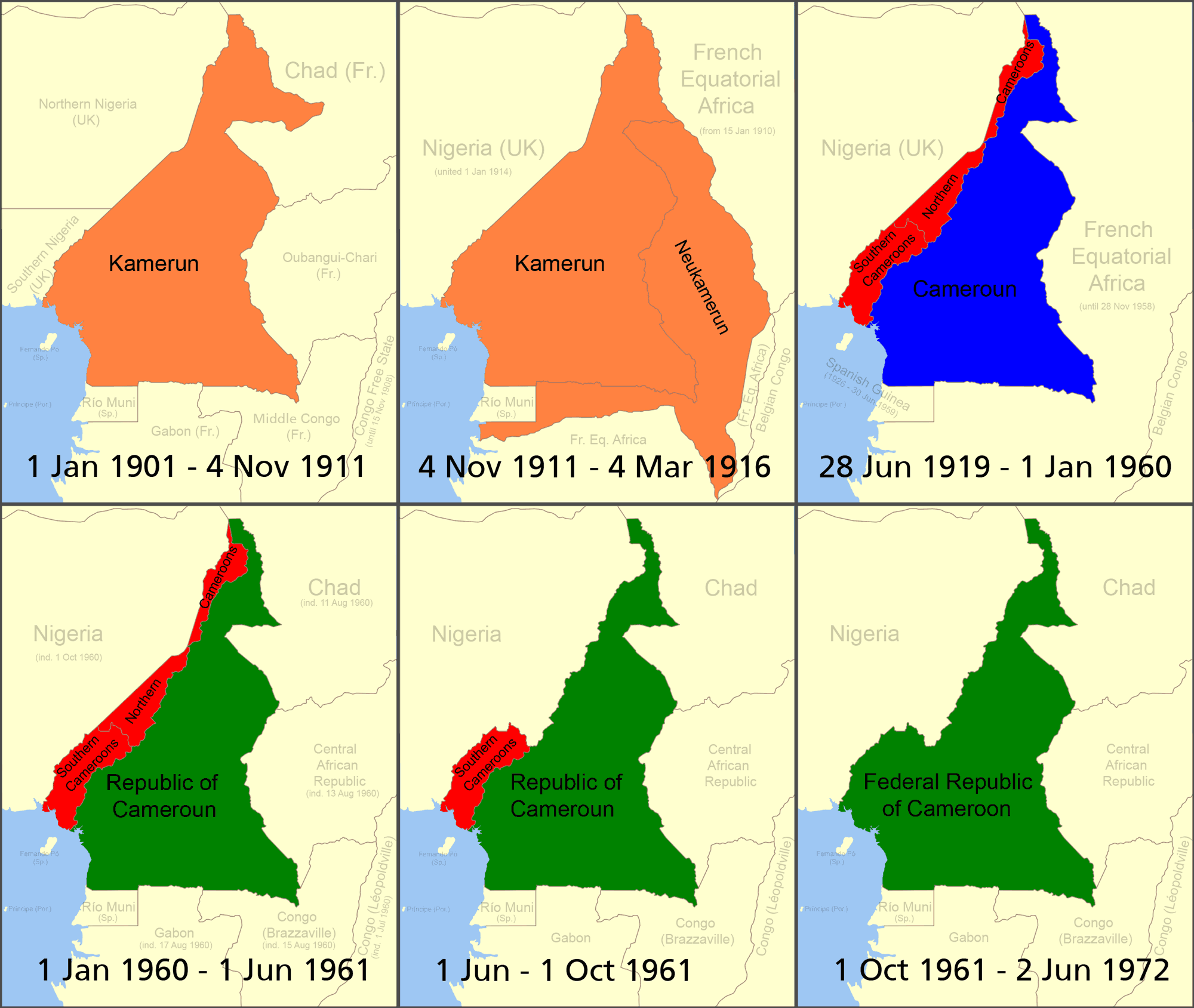

In 1953, Shoghi Effendi, the head of the Baháʼí Faith, planned an international teaching plan termed the Ten Year Crusade. This was during a period of wide scale growth in the religion across Sub-Saharan Africa near the end of the period of the Colonisation of Africa. During the plan Ali Nakhjavani and his wife drove by car with two African pioneers from Uganda where the religion was growing very quickly to open new countries to the religion. The first pioneer in the region was Max Kinyerezi October 6 who settled in what was then French Equatorial Africa, and then Enoch Olinga to British Cameroon on October 15. In Limbe (then called Victoria), through the efforts of Olinga, Jacob Tabot Awo converted to the religion becoming the first Cameroonian Baháʼí. During the following year there were many converts to the religion, many of whom were from the Basel Mission system of Protestant Christians. Meherangiz Munsiff, a young Indian woman, arrived in French Cameroon in April 1954 in Douala after helping to found the Baháʼí Faith in Madagascar. A letter from Olinga describes the advancement of the religion into 6 towns and translation work into the Duala language had begun of a pamphlet.

As the number of Baháʼís was growing rapidly, Shoghi Effendi asked if members of the religion could pioneer to neighboring areas where there were still no Baháʼís. On April 21, 1954 a Baháʼí Local Spiritual Assembly was formed and five young Cameroonians left during the Ridván period, each becoming a Knight of Baháʼu'lláh; the various protectorates they arrived in merged into the modern countries of Cameroon, Ghana, and Togo. It was emphasized that western pioneers be self-effacing and focus their efforts not on the colonial leadership but on the native Africans - and that the pioneers must show by actions the sincerity of their sense of service to the Africans in bringing the religion and then the Africans who understand their new religion are to be given freedom to rise up and spread the religion according to their own sensibilities and the pioneers to disperse or step into the background. Enoch Olinga is specifically mentioned as an example of this process unfolding as he arose out of Uganda and repeated the quick growth of the religion. Because of the successive waves of people becoming Knights of Baháʼu'lláh, Enoch Olinga was entitled "Abd'l-Futuh", a Persian name meaning "the father of victories" by Shoghi Effendi. In very early 1955, Valerie Wilson, an Auxiliary Board member for Africa stationed in Monrovia, Liberia, embarked on what was considered a bold trip for a woman alone by car to travel on a trip across some 3,000 kilometres (2,000 mi) to visit the Baháʼí groups functioning in the Gold Coast, Togoland and the British Cameroons. In April 1955 British Cameroon had eight assemblies.

== Growth ==
In 1956 a regional Baháʼí National Spiritual Assembly of North West Africa was elected with Olinga as the chairman with its seat in Tunis, comprising areas from the Cameroons north to Tunisia and parts west including Islands like the Canary Islands. Early in 1957 the Baháʼís in British Cameroon acquired a center and the population was noted at some 300 Baháʼís while the younger community of French Cameroon had between 10 and 20 Baháʼís and there was a Baháʼí conference on the progress of the religion held in Mutengene, near Tiko. In 1958 the Baháʼís of Cameroon sent another pioneer, Willie Enang, to Ghana while multiple communities held local conferences on the progress of the religion in their area. Baháʼís sometimes walked through dense forests to people who had not heard of Jesus Christ. By 1960 the entire Baháʼí population across North West Africa was 3000 and 1800 were in British Cameroon. Limbe, (then called Victoria), British Cameroon, hosted the convention for the election of the regional national assembly for north west Africa in 1960 and there were 45 delegates, including local chiefs and women, as well as Enoch Olinga. Enoch Olinga could not attend the dedication of the Baháʼí House of Worship in his native Uganda because of political turmoil in Cameroon after independence. While over 1500 people and Baháʼís from many places in Africa went, Olinga preferred to stay in Cameroon to help guide the Baháʼís through times of civil unrest.

By 1963 the following cities in Cameroon had Baháʼí communities:

Local Spiritual Assemblies in Cameroon

Ashum	Atibon	Bakebe	Bakogo	Bangapongo	Bara	Batchuakagbe	Batchuntai	Bekume	Boa	Buea
Douala	Defang	Ebeagwa	Ebinsi	Ebonji	Edjuingang	Eshobi	Etoko	Eyang	Faitok	Fotabe
Kembong	Kombone	Kumba	Mambo	Mamfe	Mbatop	Mbehetok	Mbinjong	Moliwe	Molyko	Muambong
Mukonyo	Mutengene	Muyuka	Nchemba	Nfontem	Ngassang	Ngombuku	Nguti	Ntenembang	Nyang	Ossing
Sabes	Sumbe	Takpa	Takwai	Tali	Tiko	Tinto (1)	Tinto (2)	Tintombu	Tombel	Victoria (Limbe)

Baháʼí groups (between 1 and 9 individuals)

Bamenda	Bato	Besongabang	Ekona
Ekpaw	Marumba	Mpundu	Tayor

Isolated individuals

Bomono	Dibombari	Ebensuk	Melkai
Moanjo	Ndekwai	Nsoke	Yaoundé

Later October 1963 at a large public meeting in Belgium the ambassador to Belgium from the Republic of Cameroons was a guest at a Baháʼí observance of United Nations Day.

=== Regionalization issues ===
And in 1963 the Cameroons were re-organized under the regional national assembly system to be with the West-Central African National Assembly. The second convention was held in Limbe - and that year its members were Stephen Tabe, Sampson Forchnk, Janet Mughrabi, Moses Akombi, Lillie Rosenberg, Oscar Njang, Jawad Mughrabi and Solomon Tanyi and Sherman Rosenberg. The convention of 1966 for the west central regional national assembly was held in Mamfe. Following the death of Shoghi Effendi, the elected Universal House of Justice was head of the religion and began to re-organized the Baháʼí communities of Africa by splitting off national communities to form their own National Assemblies from 1967 though the 1990s. In the presence of Hand of the Cause William Sears in 1967 the National Spiritual Assembly (NSA) of the Baháʼís of Cameroon was elected for the first time thus splitting the country off from the regional National Assembly established in 1956 and had jurisdiction over neighboring areas of Spanish Guinea, Fernando Po, Cariseo and São Tomé and Príncipe Islands while the rest of the west central regional assembly continued over other countries. In 1967 the Bahá´ís of Cameroon initiated a proclamation project in Spanish territories of Fernando Poo and Rio Muni.

In December 1971 Cameroon hosted the first regional African youth conference in Yaounde. Bus loads and cars of youth came from Chad and the Central African Republic, including youth visiting from the Philippines, Malaysia, India, Iran, Canada and the United States then in Chad and Cameroon for a period of service to the community came - during the conference two radio interviews were given. Book exhibits were held in 1974 in the University in Yaounde and a classroom in the Pan-African Institute of the Buea which also attracted radio coverage. In 1978 an international Baháʼí youth Conference was held in Cameroon with 380 attendees from some 19 countries.

Though he had recently toured Cameroonian in 1975 in December 1979 a full account of the circumstances under which Knight of Baháʼu'lláh for Cameroon, Hand of the Cause, Enoch Olinga had been murdered September 16, 1977 in Uganda during political and social turmoil. Final answers may never be known why he and most of his family were murdered with confidence. A biography published in 1984 examined his impact in Cameroon and beyond. The first person in Cameroon to join the religion withstood beatings to persevere in his choice. The first woman to become a Baháʼí in Cameroon did so from his impact on her life though she had been an active Christian before - both she and her husband converted and were among the first to move to Togo and then Ghana. Another early Baháʼí, the first of the Bamiliki tribe, moved to what was then French Cameroon to help there. Another early contact joined the religion later but his wife was the first Baháʼí of Nigeria. The researcher again found that there was an emphasis not on rooting out cultural traditions among the peoples but instead focusing on awareness of the religion and awareness of scientific knowledge should not relate to social class. There were accusations of political intrigue of which Olinga was acquitted. It was judged that Olinga was always sincere and never belittled.

In 1982 the first Baháʼí under the assigned region to Cameroon of Fernando Po joined the religion. Joseph Sheppherd was a pioneer to Cameroon and Equatorial Guinea, circumstances woven into a book he later wrote which presents the Baháʼí Faith in a context of global change (see Baháʼí Faith in fiction) and delves into the dynamics of pioneering as a method to gain understanding of spiritual issues compared to social issues, to struggle with a cultural naivete, which was published in Baháʼí News in December 1988.

=== Intranational developments ===
In 1967 local assemblies began to acquire or build local centers as one of many activities of the community some of which continued into 1968. Informational packets and interviews were granted to major print and radio news outlets and coverage of events continued.

In October 1967 the Baháʼís of Cameroon were included in efforts, and multiplied instances of, observances of United Nations Day across Cameroon including talks given by Hand of the Cause Rúhíyyih Khanum. In November Rúhíyyih Khanum dedicated the first school in the Cameroons which was dedicated first to classes studying the religion, (the first classes were held in December 1968.) The convention of 1968 had 45 delegates and an observer from Fernando Po island. The NSA of the country wrote a document, Declaration of Loyalty to Government, possibly dated from 1968, which declares the loyalty of the institution to the government of the country. But in 1969 large regions of Cameroon were still sparely populated, while the first school in eastern, formerly French, Cameroon had its first meeting in spring 1969. In 1977 a mobile school was established run from a van which toured for several months in 1977 visiting villages and farms. In 1978 three regional conferences were held. A conference on the progress of the religion at which it was announced there was an estimated 166 assemblies, 27 of which and established permanent centers, and beyond that some 832 towns and places Baháʼís lived in Cameroon. A women's regional conference gathered 30 women at the national center and eighty Baháʼí gathered for a regional conference Mankon to discuss the progress of the religion. Meanwhile, two individuals toured Cameroon in January; Hand of the Cause Rahmatu'llah Muhajir and Frenchman Armir Farhang-Imani each of whom who spoke to Baháʼí and public audiences. Rahmatu'llah Muhajir again visited Cameroon as part of a broader trip through west Africa summer 1979. Hand of the Cause Collis Featherstone visited Cameroon in February 1979. In 1980 simultaneous regional Baháʼí schools were held in March in English and French with about 25 people attending each. A follow-up school was held in September at the end of which there was a wedding. In 1980 100 people including several national assembly members attended a national youth conference Yaounde. In 1982 a Baháʼí reached a remote region with pygmies and in three months was able convince 24 people to join the religion and another pioneer was moving to help him. A pair of academic researchers toured west Africa from Switzerland speaking to the public and Baháʼís in 1985. They offered public talks "Women and Development" "How can woman assume her role in society?" and "Women and the Future of Mankind." and talks to Baháʼís on "Excellence in All Things" and "Happiness in Marriage".

==== Tour of Hand of the Cause Rúhíyyih Khanum ====
From January to March 1970 Rúhíyyih Khanum crossed Africa from east to west visiting many country's communities including Cameroon, meeting with individuals and institutions both Baháʼí and civic. In October 1971 Rúhíyyih Khanum returned from western Africa. She stopped for a time in Mamfe and spoke to the Baháʼís there and emphasized the role of women in the growth of the religion. From Mamfe she traveled more widely seeing villages and regional chiefs, attending weddings and giving talks at schools. In many places she took note of women in prominent positions in the community and sometimes spoke to about the Baháʼí law of monogamy to contrast with the traditional cultural practice of polygamy and other traditional forms. A prominent meeting was of the regional conference calling for the progress of the religion in the region. She took part in the program of observances of United Nations Day sharing the stage with members of the staff of the Secretary-General of the UN as well as the staff of the Prime Minister of Cameroon. Reaching Buea she met with the Prime Minister and mentioned her wide travels in relative safety with kind assistance of villagers and truck drivers. From there she continued her travels through Douala and Yaounde and in each case also neighboring villages while also making time for radio interviews and at the University of Cameroon before moving on to Zaire.

==== International Year of the Child ====
Cameroon was one of the countries Baháʼí organized a series of events in honor of the International Year of the Child, 1979. Among the effort were articles in newspapers, tutorial schools in three cities, a women's conference in Liberia at which Cameroonians attended and radio interviews about the schools. There were women's and children's committees operating at a national level to sustain the teachers of the schools. A Baháʼí consultant traveled western Africa including Cameroon assisting communities in their efforts who was joined by volunteer from Canada who also traveled western Africa including Cameroon. And a Cameroonian woman, a headmistress of a nursery school volunteered to travel Cameroon encouraging projects and schools in the country.

==== Commemorating pioneers ====
Among those elected to the NSA was Ursula Samandari, who was elected to the institution in the years of 1972-74 and 1975–80, after being elected to the same institution in North East Africa and the British Isles. She had learned of the Baháʼí Faith from Richard St. Barbe Baker and Hasan M. Balyuzi in 1936. Among the comments at her 2003 funeral were these from the paramount chief of Buea, HRH Samuel L. Endeley:

"My dear Sister, You lived with us like one of us, you served faithfully and lovingly to win souls into God's redeeming grace. You loved us and our country, Cameroon, and you have demonstrated this in dying here like the good soldier of God you have lived to be. You died with your boots on. We thank God for all you were to us. May your soul rest with the good God, our creator, in perfect peace."

Another member of the NSA who died unexpectedly was Karen Bare who had come from Hawaii in 1969. She was known for offering hospitality and also walking to villages for classes she taught and was elected as Secretary to the NSA for a time. She died in a car accident in 1974 while visiting family in the United States.

== Modern community ==
By 2001 the National Spiritual Assembly was registered with the Government of Cameroon as one of the few non-Christian religions. Also in 2003 a project had begun to move the seat of the National Spiritual Assembly from Limbe, in the west, to the central capital, Yaoundé, together with the responsibility to acquire a new National Baháʼí Centres for which the Baháʼí community of the United Kingdom has been asked to help.

=== Jubiliee ===
Over 600 Baháʼís and their friends gathered at the Palais des congrès in Yaoundé to celebrate the Golden Jubilee of the founding of the Baháʼí community in Cameroon. Mr. and Mrs. Nakhjavani and other guests of honour, went to Limbe to visit the Baháʼí s of the southwest province, and Buea where they were received by the paramount chief, and travelled to Douala.

=== Demographics ===
In 2003 the Baháʼí community claimed 40,000 adherents and 58 Local Spiritual Assemblies, (there is another estimate from 2007-8 of more than 130,000 Baháʼís in Cameroon and another of members of the religion in 1744 localities in Cameroon.) However the Association of Religion Data Archives estimated there were some 50799 Baháʼís in 2005.

=== Multiplying interests ===
Since its inception the religion has had involvement in socio-economic development beginning by giving greater freedom to women, promulgating the promotion of female education as a priority concern, and that involvement was given practical expression by creating schools, agricultural coops, and clinics. The religion entered a new phase of activity when a message of the Universal House of Justice dated 20 October 1983 was released. Baháʼís were urged to seek out ways, compatible with the Baháʼí teachings, in which they could become involved in the social and economic development of the communities in which they lived. World-wide in 1979 there were 129 officially recognized Baháʼí socio-economic development projects. By 1987, the number of officially recognized development projects had increased to 1482. The Cameroonian community also became involved in a number of initiatives. In 1985 Baháʼís established a tutorial school among the pygmies and the building infrastructure was to be expanded by the government now that a site had been developed. In 1990 the Cameroonian community held a nationwide campaign on the growth of the religion named in honor of Hand of the Cause Enoch Olinga with teams named after other Hands of the Cause.

==== Involvement in advocacy for women ====
The Cameroonian Baháʼí community has initiated and cooperated with a number of projects attempting to equalize the position of women, a primary principle of the religion. In 1985 a National Women's Committee of the Baha'is of Cameroon produced a statement "Equal Rights for Women and Men". The rate at which women participated in December school of 1986 increased. The Baháʼís of Cameroon cooperated with an initiative of the Baháʼí International Community in cooperation with UNIFEM on a project to effect a change in the social status of women in village communities in eastern Cameroon and other countries. The changes in the community focused on the role of women but aimed strongly at educating the men. According to Tiati Zock, the national coordinator of the project in Cameroon, a survey done in early 1992 among some 45 families in each of the seven villages reported that the men made virtually all of the financial decisions alone. A follow-up survey, taken in 1993, indicated more than 80 percent of the families now make such decisions in consultation between husband and wife. The number of girls being sent to one village school had increased by 82 percent by 1993.

==== Academic and civic forums ====
The Baháʼí community of Cameroon has been involved in forums for wrestling with social issues in Cameroon in both academic and civic forums. In 1987 Cameroonian university students gathered in a conference from multiple tribes along with international students to facilitate an exchange of ideas on issues they all faced in society. This theme evolved in Yaoundé into the theme "African Youth Facing the Challenges of Modern Society" in 1988 and "The Role of Youth in a World in Search of Peace" in 1989. Annual youth conferences in the northwest evolved and continued through 1990 and echoed many of these themes while also making efforts on other themes. In 2002 the second Cameroon Baháʼí Academy took place at the Regional Baháʼí Centre at Yaoundé with 28 scholars from Buea, Douala, Dschang, Soa, and Yaoundé. The key research paper, "Cameroonian Tribal and Family Meetings and the Baháʼí Teachings," was presented by Chongwain Nkuo, a teacher at the Post and Telecommunication School. It was published in the December 2002 volume of the Cameroon Baháʼí Studies journal. After his presentation there was an evaluation of his work by the members of a jury including David Nkwenti, Head of the Department of Anthropology of the University of Yaoundé. Nkwenti indicated he was going to expand academic interests in studying Baháʼí teachings and anthropological issues. Also in 2002, for United Nations Day on October 24, members of the Buea religious community gathered for an interfaith panel discussion led by the Secretary General of the South West Province; the group included members or spokesmen of the Baháʼí Faith, the Muslim Imam, a representative of the Bishop of the Catholic Diocese, and a representative of the Hindu community. A January 20, 2007 service in Buea at the Baháʼí Centre of Learning commemorated World Religion Day among a similar breadth of representation.

== See also ==
- History of Cameroon
- Freedom of religion in Cameroon
- Bamileke
