= Bakebe =

- Location in Cameroon
- Coordinates: 5°34′45″N 9°32′15″E
- Country: Cameroon
- Province: South-West Province

Bakebe is a city in Cameroon located at coordinates 5°57′00″N 9°56′00″E, at an altitude of 2,870 feet (870 meters). Its time zone is UTC+1.
