= Baháʼí World Congress =

Large gathering of Bahá'ís

Emblem of the Second Baháʼí World Congress

The Baháʼí World Congress is a large gathering of Baháʼís from across the world that is called irregularly by the Universal House of Justice, the governing body of the Baháʼís. There have only been two conferences of this nature; in 1963 and 1992.

== 1963: First Baháʼí World Congress ==
The first Baháʼí World Congress was held in Royal Albert Hall in London, England and approximately 6,000 Baháʼís attended. It was called to announce and present the election of the first Universal House of Justice, elected by the participation of over 50 National Spiritual Assemblies. Enoch Olinga, last of the named Hands of the Cause, chaired the main meeting of the Congress.

Issam Tahan was in London during treatment for heart problems he later died from. He was the small boy who, while his father was in prison in Morocco that had risen to public pressure on Morocco, chanted a prayer before the audience of the Congress.

Mrs. Ruthy Tu, the first woman citizen of Taiwan to become a Baháʼí, was able to attend the first Congress, as did the first Baháʼí convert outside the mainland of Scotland - Lilian McKay. O. Z. Whitehead, actor in Grapes of Wrath movie and writer also attended.

== 1992: Second Baháʼí World Congress ==
The Second Baháʼí World Congress from 23–26 November 1992 took place in order to pay homage to the 100th anniversary of the passing of the founder of the Baháʼí Faith, Baháʼu'lláh. 30,000 Baháʼís attended the event in the Jacob Javits Center in New York City, United States, for four days of commemoration in the form of music, speeches, artistic performances and social gathering.

The Congress participants represented the diversity of the Baháʼís from over 180 different nations. The purpose of this World Congress was to "celebrate the Centenary of the inauguration of the Covenant of Baháʼu'lláh and to proclaim its aims and unifying power."

=== Program ===
The main sessions of the World Congress took place two hours each day at the Jacob Javits Center.

- Day one concentrated on the recognition of Baha'u'llah as the Promise of All Ages.
- Day two celebrated ʻAbdu'l-Bahá as the Center of the Covenant. The program highlighted the nature of the Covenant, and New York as the City of the Covenant.
- Day three covered some achievements of the Baháʼí community.
- Day four explored humanity's encounter with Baháʼu'lláh as a prelude to the culmination of the congress, a message from the Universal House of Justice.
