= Ali Nakhjavani =

Prominent Iranian Baháʼí

Alí-Yulláh Nakhjavání (19 September 1919 – 11 October 2019) was an Azerbaijani-born Iranian Baháʼí, who served as a member of the Universal House of Justice, the supreme governing body of the Baháʼí Faith, between 1963 and 2003.

Ali Nakhjavani was born in 1919 in Baku, in the then Azerbaijan Democratic Republic, to Ali-Akbar Nakhjavani and Fatimih Khanum, both Baháʼís. After his father's death circa 1921, when he was two, his family was advised by ʻAbdu'l-Bahá to move to Haifa, Israel, where he grew up. In 1939 he received a Bachelor of Arts degree with distinction from the American University of Beirut, and then in the early 1940s he returned to Iran, residing first in Tehran, then Tabriz and finally in Shiraz. In 1950 he was elected to the Baháʼí National Spiritual Assembly of Iran, the governing body of the Baháʼís in that country, where he served until the following year.

In 1951, Ali Nakhjavání and his family moved to Uganda to assist with the development of the Baháʼí community in that country; while he was there he worked as a teacher and lecturer. During his early years there, Enoch Olinga joined the religion, and in 1953 Nakhjavání, and his wife along with Olinga and two other Baháʼís travelled from Uganda to Cameroon to help spread the Baháʼí Faith in Cameroon. From 1954-61 he was a member of the Auxiliary Board for the spread of the religion in Africa, and later from 1956 to 1961 he was elected to the Baháʼí National Spiritual Assembly of Central and East Africa, the Baháʼí governing body for the region.

In 1961, Nakhjavání was elected to the International Baháʼí Council — the forerunner to the Universal House of Justice, the worldwide governing body of the Baháʼís — and thus moved to Haifa, Israel. In 1963 he was elected to the Universal House of Justice during its inaugural convention, and served as a member of that body until 2003.

== Works ==
Nakhjavání wrote many works that were published in Baháʼí periodicals, as well as authoring three books:

- Nakhjavání, Alí (2005). Towards World Order. Baha'i Publications Australia. ISBN 978-1-876322-93-9.
- Nakhjavání, Alí (2006). Shoghi Effendi: Author of Teaching Plans (PDF). Casa Editrice Baha'i Italy. ISBN 978-88-7214-107-6.
- Nakhjavání, Alí (2006). Shoghi Effendi: The Range and Power of His Pen. Casa Editrice Baha'i Italy. ISBN 978-88-7214-112-0.
