= Baháʼí Faith in Uganda =

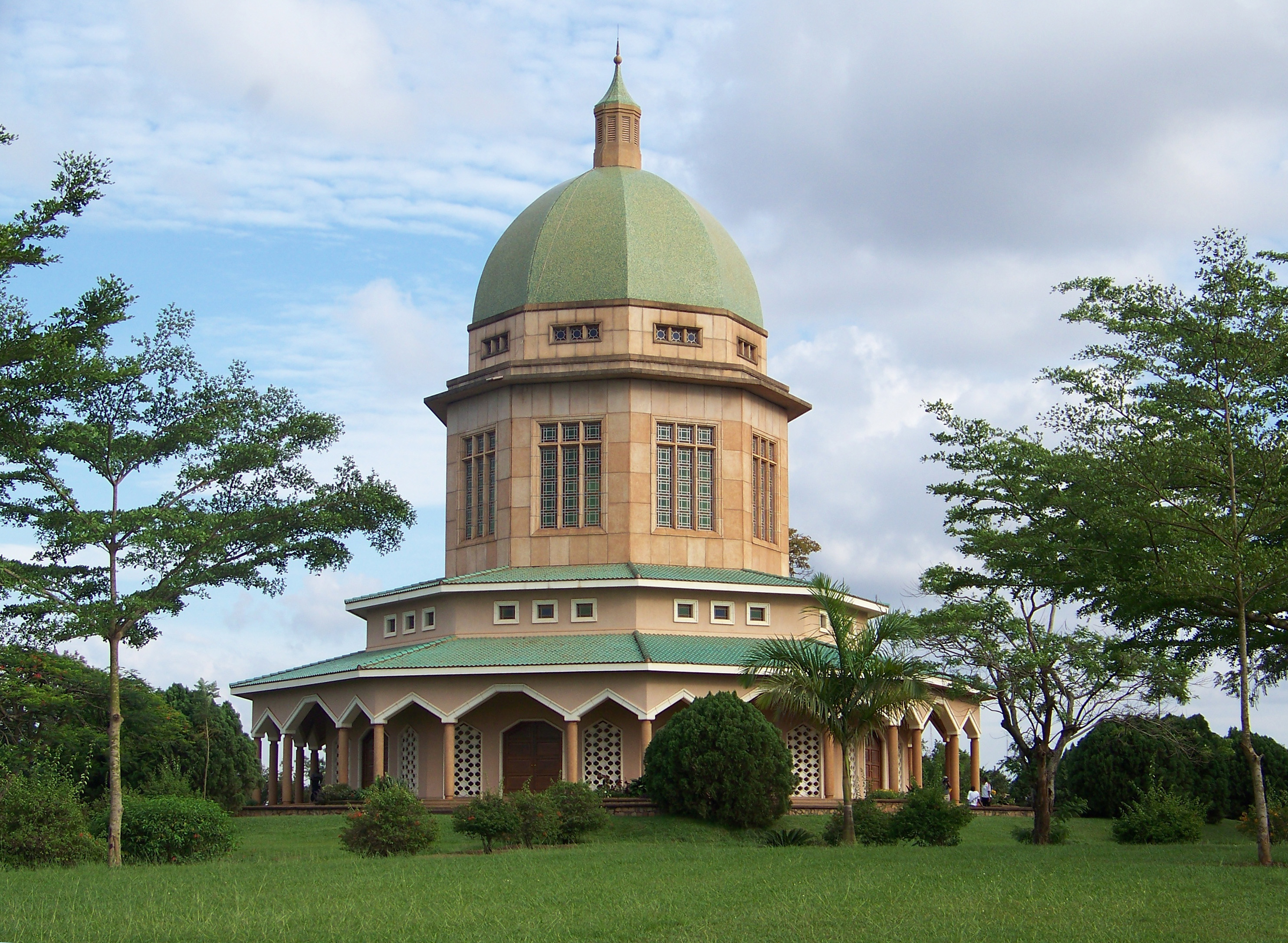
Baháʼí House of Worship, Kampala, Uganda

The Baháʼí Faith in Uganda started to grow in 1951 and four years later there were 500 Baháʼís in 80 localities, including 13 Baháʼí Local Spiritual Assemblies, representing 30 tribes, and had dispatched 9 pioneers to other African locations. Following the reign of Idi Amin when the Baháʼí Faith was banned and the murder of Baháʼí Hand of the Cause Enoch Olinga and his family, the community continues to grow though estimates of the population range widely from 19,000 to 105,000 and the community's involvements have included diverse efforts to promote the welfare of the Ugandan people. The Association of Religion Data Archives (relying on World Christian Encyclopedia) estimated about 78,500; however, National Population & Housing Census, 2014 recorded only 29,601.

== Early history ==
=== ʻAbdu'l-Bahá's Tablets of the Divine Plan ===
ʻAbdu'l-Bahá wrote a series of letters, or tablets, to the followers of the religion in the United States in 1916–1917; these letters were compiled together in the book Tablets of the Divine Plan. The eighth and twelfth of the tablets mentioned Africa and were written on April 19, 1916, and February 15, 1917, respectively. Publication however was delayed in the United States until 1919—after the end of the First World War and the Spanish flu. The tablets were translated and presented by Mirza Ahmad Sohrab on April 4, 1919, and published in Star of the West magazine on December 12, 1919. ʻAbdu'l-Bahá mentions Baháʼís traveling "…especially from America to Europe, Africa, Asia and Australia, and travel through Japan and China. Likewise, from Germany teachers and believers may travel to the continents of America, Africa, Japan and China; in brief, they may travel through all the continents and islands of the globe" and " …the anthem of the oneness of the world of humanity may confer a new life upon all the children of men, and the tabernacle of universal peace be pitched on the apex of America; thus Europe and Africa may become vivified with the breaths of the Holy Spirit, this world may become another world, the body politic may attain to a new exhilaration…."

=== Connections and development ===
An early instance of contact between Uganda and the Baháʼí Faith came in September 1946 when Ugandan Dr. Ernest Kalibala, one of Uganda's first PhDs then associated with the UN, gave a talk at the New York Baháʼí Center. Particular plans to bring the religion to Uganda began in 1950 involving the cooperation of American, British, Egyptian, and Persian Baháʼí communities and reached a level of coordination and detail that materials were translated into languages widely used in Africa before pioneers reached Africa. On August 3, 1951 Mr. and Mrs. Músá Banání, Mrs. Violette and Mr. Ali Nakhjavani, of Iran, with their baby daughter Bahiyyih, and Mr. Philip Hainsworth arrived in Kampala. Banání was an adult convert to the religion during World War I. After receiving the news that Hand of the Cause Louis George Gregory — Hands of the Cause are a select group of Baháʼís who achieved a distinguished rank in service to the religion — had died previously on July 31, a commemorative meeting for Gregory was held in Kampala at which the five pioneers and Marguerite Preston (from Kenya) were joined by twelve Africans. In October an observance of the birth of the Báb was the first to be held in the home of a Bugandan citizen of Uganda, with prayers said in Luganda. In December, the first two native Ugandans had converted to the Baháʼí Faith — Fred Bigabwa (Mutoro tribe) and Chrispin Kajubi (Buganda tribe). While Banání was on pilgrimage, World War II veteran Enoch Olinga (of Iteso tribe), who had been attending classes taught by Nakhjavani in Kampala, was the third Ugandan to become a Baháʼí and swore off alcohol, though his alcoholism had already cost him his government job.

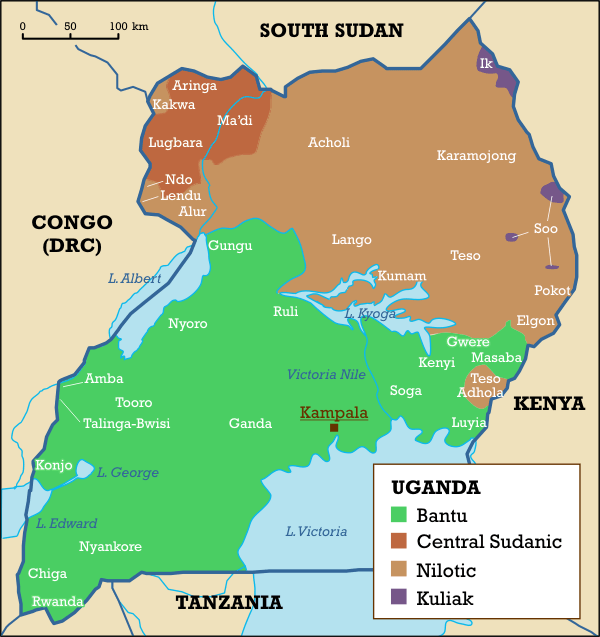
Ethnolinguistic map of Uganda.

The first Baháʼí Local Spiritual Assembly in the country was elected in April 1952 in Kampala. The members of the assembly were Fred Bigabwa, Chrispin Kajubi, Peter Musoke, Enoch Olinga, Mr and Mrs Músá Banání, Mr and Mrs Ali Nakhjavani and Philip Hainsworth. These were soon joined by American pioneers, Mary and Reginald (Rex) Collison, in about May. In early 1952, Músá Banání was also appointed as a Hand of the Cause. In the summer of 1952 the Baháʼís bought the first center for hosting meetings. By October 1952 there were 55 members of the religion including Olinga's father, living in 12 different localities and representing 9 different tribes: Ganda, Gishu, Gwero, Kabarasi, Kakamega, Luo, Sega, Teso, Toro. Six of them were women. Eighteen were in Kampala and 26 in Teso country. Like Olinga other Baháʼís effected a change in character when converting to the religion and giving up alcoholism. These joined the religion by conversion from Roman Catholic, Protestant and pagan backgrounds and the rural areas were organized into committees until Assemblies could be organized. In February 1953 the first inter-continental conference of four designated by the head of the religion was taking place in Kampala. On the program were Hands of the Cause (already appointed or not yet) Dorothy Beecher Baker, ʻAlí-Akbar Furútan, Ugo Giachery, Hermann Grossman, ʻAlí-Muhammad Varqá, George Townshend, and Dhikru'llah Khadem giving a wide variety of talks and classes across 7 days opened with a message from Shoghi Effendi read by Hand of the Cause Leroy Ioas. By April nine more assemblies were elected among a community of over two hundred ninety members of the religion, residing in twenty-five localities, and representative of twenty tribes. In June 1953 the American pioneers Mr. and Mrs. Rex Collison moved to Ruanda-Urundi from Kampala. In October 1953 Olinga went on to Cameroon and was honoured with the title Knight of Baháʼu'lláh.

== Developing community ==
Wide-scale growth in the religion across Sub-Saharan Africa was observed to begin in the 1950s and extend in the 1960s. After the conference in February 1953 Bill and Marguerite Sears arrived in September 1953 visiting from Johannesburg for an extended stay into October giving many classes and traveling to many villages. It was also during this time the first pioneer from Uganda went to Mwanza, Tanganyika. In 1954 Uganda had 500 Baháʼís in 80 localities, including 13 Local Spiritual Assemblies, representing 30 tribes, and had dispatched 9 pioneers to other African locations. In 1955 there were over 800 Baháʼís having just added seventeen assemblies. In 1956 Olinga was elected as Chairman of the North West regional Baháʼí National Spiritual Assembly and the Ugandan Baháʼí community came under the newly formed regional National Spiritual Assembly of Central & Eastern Africa, of which Nakhjavani was the Chairman and the Ugandan community alone topped 1000 members. The other members of the regional assembly over Uganda were Philip Hainsworth, Hassan Sabri, Oloro Epyeruj, Aziz Yazdi, Jalal Nakhjavani, Tito Wanantsusit, Sylvester Okurut, and Max Kenyerezi. In early 1957 Olinga attended the laying of the foundation stone of the first Baháʼí House of Worship of Africa (which was in Uganda) and in the fall he was appointed a Hand of the Cause and Knight of Baháʼu'lláh Clare Gung, formerly of Germany, moved from Tanganyika to Uganda where she founded a multi-racial kindergarten nursery. Systems were initiated to deal with the rate of growth of the religion - weekend Baháʼí schools were set up for any Baháʼí who could attend and individuals who were judged to have a substantial understanding of the religion and were able to travel were selected for training as presenters who would then travel locally in their area to make presentations on many of the same themes. By the summer of 1957 13 weekend schools had been held. It was believed these schools lent impetus to the continued growth of the religion in the area by empowering local members of the religion and the schools were repeated in 1958. And the same year regional and local assemblies were registered with the civil government. In 1957 a lone Baháʼí, a member of the Tesa, Yokolamu Okello, reached the relatively remote and pagan region of Moroto in Karamoja and in 1958 the first spiritual assembly was formed there. Conversions to the Baháʼí Faith in Uganda even reached into the prisons where Shoghi Effendi, then head of the religion, responded to letters by encouraging the inmates to use their "stumbled" history not to become "embittered or defeated" but "determined to make it a means of purifying your natures, improving your characters, and enabling you to become better citizens in the future." The quick growth of the religion in Uganda was attributed by Baháʼís to the sincerity of their purpose and to the demonstrated lack of racial prejudice.

=== House of Worship ===
In 1958 the land for the temple had to be bought in the name of three African Ugandan Baháʼís rather than an institution directly foreign or domestic. These Baháʼís were Joseph Mbogo, Erisha Kiwanuka and Max Kanyerezi who held the land in trust. The Baháʼí House of Worship in Uganda, named as the Mother Temple of Africa, is situated on Kikaaya Hill on the outskirts of Kampala. At the ceremony of the laying of the foundation stone in 1958 Hands of the Cause Ruhiyyih Khanum and Músá Banání presented material gifts for the building - some soil from the inner-most Shrine of Baháʼu'lláh and the fortress of Maku where the Báb was imprisoned. The building was designed by Mason Remey and the green dome is made of fixed mosaic tiles from Italy, the lower roof tiles are from Belgium, and the colored glass in the wall panels was brought from Germany. Nine massive columns, each two feet in diameter, support the great dome, itself forty-four feet in diameter at its base; while the two roofs are supported by two sets of twenty seven slightly smaller columns. The overall height is 127 ft., the internal diameter of the building is eighty four feet and the seating capacity is over 600. The inside of the dome is painted a pale blue; the rotunda, into which are set nine enormous windows and fifty-four small windows, all filled with green, amber and pale blue glass, is painted a brilliant white, while the columns and the lower walls are painted a very pale green. All this lends itself to an effect of lightness and airiness which is intensified by the large green and amber glass-filled grilles which stand on either side of the huge mvule doors.

The fifty-acre property includes the House of Worship, extensive gardens, a guest house, and an administrative center. In 1960 the Ugandan government built an access road out to the site of the temple and a Bugandan council of ministers came to see the building. Observances of Baháʼí Holy days are held and regular services are normally held about 4 pm on Sunday afternoons. By the end of 1965 an estimated 50,000 visitors had come to the temple. Both Hands of the Cause Enoch Olinga and Músá Banání are buried near the Temple.

==== Dedication ====
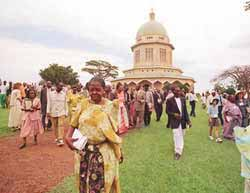
Practising Baha'is

Festivities associated with the opening of the temple were wide-ranging through early 1961. The Ugandan government publication Uganda Argus covered the history and description of the temple in the January 1961 issue and interviews and stories ran on the Ugandan Broadcasting service on radio. Events on site began on the 13th with a unity feast with Hands of the Cause Musa Banani, John Robarts, Rahmatu'lláh Muhájir and Chairman of the regional assembly Ali Nakhkajvani and vice-chairman O]oro Epyeru giving talks. The temple was dedicated on 14th led by Hand of the Cause Ruhiyyih Khanum where there was a viewing of portraits of the Báb and Baháʼu'lláh. And the public inaugural service was held on the 15th. Over 1500 people attended. Among the Baháʼís were some 225 African Baháʼís from Uganda, Kenya, Tanganyika, Ruanda Urundi, Ethiopia, Northern Rhodesia, Swaziland, and South Africa; some 90 Persian Baha'is, sixty-two of whom flew from Tehran; the British national assembly, the mother assembly to that of Central and East Africa, sent one believer from each of its regions - England, Scotland and Wales, as well as one from Ireland; the American national assembly sent one of its members, Amos Gibson, himself a pioneer among the American Indian peoples. Hand of the Cause Enoch Olinga was unable to attend due to political turmoil in Cameroon Olinga was attempting to help them with. A choir, especially selected from among Kampala's singers and directed by Peter Wingard of Makerere College sang music and readings offered were from the Old and New Testaments and the Qurʼan, plus a number of prayers and readings from the Baháʼí writings in Arabic, Persian, Ateso, Swahili, Acholi, Luganda and English. Following the public meeting a reception was held for representatives of the Governor and the Kabaka of Buganda, together with the Mayor of Kampala at which Ruhiyyih Khanum shared a story that Shoghi Effendi had traveled through the region in the early 1920s. Following the dedication Ruhiyyih Khanum and chairman Nakhkajvani embarked on 15 days of visiting Baháʼís through Uganda and Kenya including staying in their homes, dedicating two schools, ate native food, and were honored with traditional songs and dances. Khanum suggested repeatedly that the Ugandan's own folklore, their traditions and their native songs and music should not be discarded, but that in a society of unity in diversity they were to preserve and develop these as their contribution in enriching the spiritual and material life of human society as well as noting the equality of the sexes and that women should take equal part in administration of the religion.

=== Intercontinental conferences ===
==== First conference ====
In January 1958, soon after the death of Shoghi Effendi in November, another intercontinental conference was held in Kampala and attended by his widow Ruhiyyih Khanum. Though sorrowful at his death, there was a call to service in honor of his service. The conference had been initially planned for less than 400 attendees and was overwhelmed as news of over 300 Persians alone were coming. Ultimately some 950 Baháʼís, six Hands of the Cause, a member of the International Baháʼí Council, sixteen Auxiliary Board members, and representatives from eleven national spiritual assemblies (including those from the four African regional assemblies, those from the other national assemblies which had participated in campaign to bring the religion to sub-Saharan Africa - Britain, India, Iraq, Persia, and the United States - and those from Arabia and Japan), 450 African members, over 300 from Persia, two Knights of Baháʼu'lláh (one from the Pacific and one from the Arctic), and others from rest of the world were present at the formal convening of the conference as well as telegrams received from many other Hands of the Cause and 34 national assemblies arrived. Reportedly every hotel room was booked. Ruhiyyih Khanum anointed most attendees with Attar of rose before being admitted into a viewing of relics of Baháʼu'lláh as well as a reproduction of a painting of him on the first day of the conference. Viewings were also held of a large map by Shoghi Effendi showing the progress of the religion, films of Shrines and gardens from the Baháʼí World Center, as it existed then, as well as the Monument on the grave of Shoghi Effendi. Some $280,000 was raised at the conference from a segment of the attendees for donation to the progress of the religion. The foundation stone for the Mother Temple of Africa was laid and relics in silk bags made by Bahíyyih Khánum were set in place (planned to be under the wall on that side of the Temple facing out across a grassy valley towards the Baháʼí Qiblih.) Ruhiyyih Khanum then spent a day among the Tseo people - speaking to school groups, receiving guests, and visiting homes. She donated money for the reconstruction of a center that had been lost.

==== Second Conference ====
Six conferences held in October 1967 around the world presented a viewing of a copy of the photograph of Baháʼu'lláh on the highly significant occasion commemorating the centennial of Baháʼu'lláh's writing of the Suriy-i-Mulúk (Tablet to the Kings), which Shoghi Effendi describes as "the most momentous Tablet revealed by Baháʼu'lláh". After a meeting in Edirne (Adrianople), Turkey, the Hands of the Cause travelled to the conferences, with each carrying a copy of the photograph of Baháʼú'lláh. Hand of the Cause ʻAlí-Akbar Furútan conveyed this photograph to the Conference for Africa at Uganda. Ebony magazine covered the event. Ugandan radio, television and print media covered the events related to the conference as well. Some 400 Baháʼís from twenty-four African countries gathered. Kolonerio Oule, chairman of the National Assembly for Uganda and Central Africa, opened the conference on the first day and Hands of the Cause ʻAlí-Akbar Furútan and Enoch Olinga began presentations and discussions about the history of the tablets and the range of who they were made for. The next day the new national center building on the same property as the temple was dedicated - it is a circular building having a round central auditorium surrounded by a group of offices, a library, archives, publishing, guest roams and kitchen. The third day William Masehla and speaker Helen Elsie Austin focused attention on the role of the individual in the progress of the religion. That evening a public meeting of some 500 people was held followed by a reception for 250 people; efforts had focused invitations to government personnel, clergy, educational institutions and professional communities. Roger White was a representative of the Canadian national Assembly which made a gift to the Baháʼís of Uganda in the form of an illuminated tablet of the writings of the religion.

=== Other developments ===
It was in 1958 that the Baháʼís of Kampala contracted to reserve a segment of a cemetery for use by Baháʼís. Weekend schools begun in 1958 continued through 1960 though classes now used chapters from Baháʼu'lláh and the New Era by John Esslemont. In September 1961, a number of permanent Baháʼí schools were set up—two Louis Gregory Baháʼí Schools, one in Tilling, the home town of Olinga, and the other in Dusai. Courses emphasized homecraft and child rearing mixed with presentations on the religion and men supported women taking the courses. News of the openings was covered in Jet Magazine. The extraordinary number of enrollments in Uganda and Kenya had reached the point in late 1959 that the institution of the Hands of the Cause were noting there were not enough Baháʼís to keep up with the work of checking the enrollments. 1961 also saw the development of a Ugandan Baháʼí publishing trust. Olinga was able to re-visit Uganda in June, and again in August–September 1962 when he toured widely in Uganda speaking to many groups amounting to thousands of people about the religion before moving on to Kenya and Tanganyika and the Congo. As the monthly rate of growth reached into the hundreds, a goal of the Uganda Teaching Committee was of stimulating the individual assemblies and believers to assume increasing responsibility for weekend schools in their own villages so that traveling teachers could focus in other areas. In September 1962 Milton Obote, then Prime Minister of Uganda, visited the Shrine of the Bab. In 1963 Nakhjavani was elected to the Universal House of Justice, the governing body of the worldwide Baháʼí community, while Olinga chaired the first Baháʼí World Congress which announced the election to the world. By the end of 1963 there were 554 Local Spiritual Assemblies in various localities, 389 smaller Baháʼí groups, and some 200 isolated individual Baháʼís spread across Uganda. In 1964 the regional Assemblies were reassigned and Uganda joined with the Central African Republic. The July 1964 issue of Uganda Argus profiled the religion as well as a broad article about the 4 Baháʼí Houses of Worship then in existence. One hundred thirty-two delegates and visitors assembled in Kampala, Uganda, for the 1966 convention to elect the regional national assembly of Uganda and Central Africa. Olinga was able to visit Uganda again from October to December 1967 for an extended tour of the country. Rapid expansion of the religion in the late 1960s was most particularly true in Uganda, Vietnam and Indonesia. The 1968 membership of the regional national assembly of Uganda and Central Africa was: Hassan Sabri, Tito Wanantsrusri, Kolonerio Oule, Elizabeth Olinga, George William Ebetu, Moses Senoga, Sospateri Isimai, Alinote Colleque, and Albert Ocnamodek. During the period of Ayyám-i-Há 1969 the Baháʼís had a public exhibit on the religion at the Kampala national theatre. The mayor of Kampala spoke at the opening preceding the showing of the film, "And His Name Shall Be One". The exhibit consisted of books, charts, artifacts, photographs, movies, slides, and recordings. Original Tablets, books, and excerpts written by the Báb, Baháʼu'lláh, and ʻAbdu'l-Bahá were displayed along with secondary works. Baháʼí history was illustrated in a chart depicting events from the birth of Baháʼu'lláh to the founding of the Universal House of Justice, plus displays of The Dawn-Breakers in three languages. The arts were shown in oil paintings, photographs, silverwork, and handwoven carpets and the diversity of nationalities and religious backgrounds was illustrated with photographs and slides taken during conventions, Temple dedications, and intercontinental conferences. Later that summer Ruhiyyih Khanum visited Uganda on a ten-day tour. In Kampala she was able to attend several events before driving into the countryside to visit Baháʼís. In town events included: a reception given in her honor and that of two visiting members of the Universal House of Justice, Hushmand Fatheazam and 'Ali Nahkjavani; to deliver a public lecture in the hall of the national theater; to be interviewed for a full half hour on Radio Uganda on the "Guest of the Week" program; and attend a wedding at the temple along with fellow Hands of the Cause Enoch Olinga and Músá Bánaní before going on to Ethiopia and other countries on a four-month tour. She returned at the end of the tour for a few days of low key meetings with Baháʼís before her final departure.

==== Momentous changes approaching ====
In 1970 Mary Collison died - together Mary and Reginald Collison had spent their last years as caretakers of the temple. That summer Ugandan Baháʼís held their first national youth conference and elected a national assembly just for Uganda - the first members were: Enos Epyeru, Javan Gutosi, S. M. lsimai, Moses Senoga, Julias Nambafu, Augustin Massati, Augustin Naku, and Albert Ocamodek. On the Presidency of Idi Amin in August, the Baháʼís were among those invited to a meeting with the President. At the meeting the Baháʼís offered a statement outlining the basic principle of the religion of obedience to government. At a follow-up meeting, Enoch Olinga represented the community at the close of a number of sessions of Religious Conferences that took place across Uganda. Soon afterwards, Músá Banání died in September after suffering a long illness and was buried on grounds of the temple in a new Baháʼí cemetery. The funeral gathered together three Hands of the Cause: Enoch Olinga, A. Q. Faizi, Ruhiyyih Khanum; a member of The Universal House of Justice, Ali Nakbjavani, Violette Nakhjavani and their daughter, Bahiyyih, whose wedding took place two years ago in Kampala to Paul Adams many other Baháʼí leaders from across Africa as well as six members of the National Spiritual Assembly of Uganda; and many other Baha'is from all over Uganda and other parts of Africa. Pioneers like Zylpha Mapp served development interests in Uganda in 1971-2 while working as a director of guidance at the Tororo Girls' School. She was on a leave of absence from the public school system from her work in the States, and was cooperating with the Uganda Ministry of Education in developing a guidance program in other schools of the nation while also began editing the Ugandan National Baha'i Newsletter. Later in 1971 then President Amin attended the celebration of the birth of Baháʼu'lláh and made complimentary remarks about the religion. These and others worked with university researchers on mental health issues as well. Efforts inside the community included noting the importance of Baháʼí elections as part of a worldwide initiative called for by the Universal House of Justice. Other projects in 1971-2 for Uganda included beautification of the cemetery, spreading the religion, and multiple youth gatherings. In 1972 Baháʼí Dwight W. Allen won an Award of Merit for helping in the establishment of the Tororo Girls' School which was transitioned to administration by the Ugandan government. Enoch Olinga's daughter Florence began attending the Tororo school in 1972 while other youth began making trips to various communities in support of Baháʼí activities. In 1973 Enoch Olinga and his wife both spoke at the Tororo School while the school also had visits from other leaders of the religion. In 1975-6 the Olingas toured parts of Uganda as well as having talks with government officials on the teachings of the religion with some of their travels covered by announcements by radio. Meanwhile, a public exhibit on the religion was held at the national museum which was covered by the now renamed Voice of Uganda national newsletter as well as examine Baháʼí teachings. 1975 was the silver anniversary of the religion in Uganda and a celebration, commemorating it was concluded with a program in observance of United Nations Day and a reception of high-ranking official guests from other Ghana and the UN, and members of the religion who had come from some villages. In 1976 Zylpha Mapp-Robinson, the daughter of the first African-American woman Baháʼí, who had pioneered in many places and who lived in Uganda nine years, was elected to the national spiritual assembly of Uganda in 1976. In June 1977 a small conference of leaders of the religion including the Olingas was held to discuss the progress of the growth of the religion. It was unusual in that even though just 52, 13 of whom were youth, were at the meeting, they received a message from the Universal House of Justice. Enoch Olinga reminded the group that Shoghi Effendi had called the Ugandan community the spiritual heart of Africa. In September the administrative institutions of the religion had been disbanded by the government along with over two dozen other groups. Soon the Uganda-Tanzania War broke out in 1978 and President Amin was overthrown by early 1979.

==== Oppression, violence, and freedom ====
As part of a sweep across several Sub-Saharan countries, the Baháʼí Faith was banned in the 1970s in several countries: Burundi, 1974; Mali 1976; Uganda 1977; Congo, 1978; Niger, 1978. Uganda had had the largest Baháʼí community in Africa at the time and Olinga had returned and sought the protection of the community during this difficult time when Idi Amin's regime ruled Uganda. See also Uganda under Idi Amin.

"This was principally the result of a campaign by a number of Arab countries. Since these countries were also by this time providers of development aid, this overt attack on the Baha'is was supported by covert moves such as linking the aid money to a particular country to the action that it took against the Baha'is. This was partially successful and a number of countries did ban the Baha'is for a time. However, the Baha'is were able to demonstrate to these governments that they were not agents of Zionism nor anti-Islamic and succeeded in having the ban reversed in all of these countries except Niger."

It was a period of violence from 1978. In March 1979 the Olinga home was robbed though the temple was undisturbed and there was a suspicious accident where Olinga's car was rammed and forced down a hill by a troop transport vehicle, where he was robbed and left for dead, and Olinga's son George was disappeared for a week by soldiers of Amin. Death threats perhaps simply because of his prominence came to Olinga from his home town. Meanwhile, after President Amin fled in April the religion began to re-organize - there was the re-opening of the Baháʼí House of Worship again, and the beginning of reforming the national assembly in August. Neighbors and a garden servant boy bore witness mostly by hearing events of the execution of the Olinga family. On the evening of Sunday, September 16, 1979, the birthday of one of Olinga's daughters and planned as a day of a family reunion of which a few could not arrive in time, after 8pm local time five soldiers entered Olinga's home while one stood guard at the household gate and killed Olinga, his wife, and three of their five children. Trails of blood went from the kitchen to the back of the house and one of the children had been hurt and roughly bandaged before the family was executed. Enoch himself was killed out in the yard where he had been heard weeping after perhaps witnessing his dead family in the very same house he had joined the religion in. The news was conveyed initially by the garden servant to a member of the national committee that had been appointed and then to a 79-year-old pioneer, Claire Gung, who called internationally. Ultimately news reached the Universal House of Justice while it sat in session on the 17th. All the dead were buried in the Baháʼí cemetery on the temple grounds on the 25th while civil war and terrorism continued. The funeral included hundreds of Baháʼís who could make the trip and several members of the government of Uganda.

After the Uganda-Tanzania War and when the ban on the religion was rescinded, Ugandan Baháʼís re-formed their National Spiritual Assembly in 1981, though the Ugandan Bush War dragged on. In 1982 the two primary schools the Baháʼís had founded in 1961 were again under Baháʼí administration by February 1982. More than 200 Baháʼís and non-Baháʼís gathered in 1983 to celebrate children and a kindergarten multi-racial nursery school established by Claire Gung and Rex Collison died in June 1983. Instances of hundreds of people joining the religion recurred in 1984. In about February 1985 George Olinga and Benson Kariuki gave a talk at one of the primary schools about the religion about the institutions of the religion and Claire Gung died while the nursery she established was assumed by the national assembly and funds were allotted for the renovation of the primary schools. In 1986-7 Dwight W. Allen returned to Uganda and was the project coordinator for the Donors' Conference for the rehabilitation of Makerere University. In 1988 the community held a children's conference and was visible in a number of public events including a preferential trade exhibition at which various governmental leaders visited.

== Involvement in society ==
The Ugandan Baháʼí community has been involved in a wide range of projects many of which benefit the nation while also advancing awareness of the religion. In 1989 a Baháʼí expert and businessman in using appropriate technology from Swaziland traveled through six southern and eastern African countries including Uganda training local people in the manufacture of several kinds of fence-making machines and other technologies in building, agriculture and water programs. The 10-day training courses were organized by the National Spiritual Assemblies in each of the six countries. In 1989 a Baháʼí Club was organized for Makerere University composed of Baháʼís and non-Baháʼís while the national assembly invited members of the Department of Religious Studies at Makerere University to the Baháʼí House of Worship to familiarize staff with the religion, its institutions and how they function to contextualize the interaction between the agencies of the religion and the university while it implemented two new courses designed and taught by a Baháʼí, Dr. Tim Rost, on "Peace and Justice" and another on "Religion and Development." At the same time Baháʼí women of Mbale took part in events organized by the National Council on Women by a multicultural children's program emphasizing good neighborliness and handicrafts of women - government administrators observed that Baháʼís had several programs advancing diverse issues in Uganda. In 1990 the Baháʼí Office of Social and Economic Development in Uganda established a project to train healthcare field workers for work in Uganda. In 1993 the national assembly added a project to develop a middle-level management training program for community level primary health care workers. The focus was on prevention of childhood diseases, maternal-infant health care, and community building. Later, the Uganda Baháʼí Institute for Development set up a project introducing use of the latrine, immunization, and nets to fight off malaria-bearing mosquitoes, and people learned the importance of clean water in a Ugandan village. In 2000, the Baháʼís of Uganda shared their activities in the areas of education, family health, moral training for children, publishing, and collaboration with other non-governmental organizations at a national United Nations Day celebration held at the Muguluka Primary School near Jinja. After receiving her Ph.D. at age 78, Zylpha Mapp-Robinson returned to Uganda at age 86 in the year 2000 to create the Ugandan Institution for the advancement of Women. In 2002 a National Conference in Guyana on "Spiritual Approach to the Challenge of HIV/AIDS" sponsored by the Varqa Foundation, UNICEF, & Baháʼí International Community highlighted experiences in Uganda dealing with the AIDS epidemic by including the role of the spiritual training of children on virtues like humility, reverence, kindliness, respect and courtesy, and unity in diversity so that they would lead moral lives and overcome not only AIDS but alcohol and drug abuse, violence, crime, prejudice, hatred, intolerance and poverty. In 2004 the Baháʼí-based Uganda Program of Literacy for Transformation helped participants acquire the skills, knowledge, and incentive for a “lifelong self-improvement plan” — coupled with an emphasis on moral education and inter-religious harmony.

The Ugandan Baháʼí community has also encouraged the practice of the arts. Eighteen youth from Kenya, Uganda, Ethiopia, and Tanzania joined together to form Youth in Motion, a Baháʼí Workshop (see Oscar DeGruy) aimed at expressing the message brought by Baháʼu'lláh. The group traveled for four months, performing before a total of more than 50,000 people in three countries. In 1998 Baháʼí Margaret Nagawa held a showing at the Ugandan National Museum, and award-winning Baháʼí Edel'Akongu Ekodelele Eyperu died in 2002.

In 2001 a week-long celebration featuring a statement by Ugandan President Yoweri Kaguta Museveni, some 2000 of the Ugandan Baha'i community commemorated the 50th anniversary of its founding.

The Baháʼís of Uganda have continued to be involved in social issues; in 2007 a movie on development issues in Uganda was produced by the Baháʼís named "Opening a Space - The Discourse on Science, Religion and Development in Uganda" and on 25 November 2007 the Baháʼí House of Worship was a rallying point on for the "Speak out! Stand out!" campaign on preventing violence against women. Baháʼí delegates from Uganda and 14 other countries convened in New York from February 23 – March 7 for the 52nd session of the UN Commission on the Status of Women in 2008.

Ugandan Baháʼís have also participated in recent international Baháʼí events. Ugandan youth were among the 149 assembled at the National Baháʼí Center in Burundi in August 2006. In 2007 Baháʼís in Entebbe helped organize World Religion Day commemorations. In 2008 one of the delegates from Uganda was one of the 19 tellers who counted the secret ballots for the election of the Universal House of Justice.

== Demographics ==
During 2000–2002 estimates of the Ugandan Baháʼí community ranged widely; sources range from 66,000 to 105,000 Baháʼís in the country. The 2002 national census counted almost 19,000 Baháʼís, and the 2014 census reported 29,601. Inbetween, the 2005 US Dept. State statistics estimated Hinduism, the Baháʼí Faith, and Judaism together formed 2% of the national population. About 300 Baháʼí believers were in Kampala according to a 2007 news report.

== See also ==
- History of Uganda
- Religion in Uganda
