= Baháʼí Faith in fiction =

The Baháʼí Faith and related topics have appeared in multiple forms of fiction. The mention of this religion can be seen in science fiction, fantasy, short stories, novelettes, novels, and TV series. In 2005, an estimated value of 30 references could be found relating Baháʼí Faith to different forms of fiction. An estimated third of these references have a significant relationship with the religion in the way that these forms of fiction show the Baháʼí Faith as a crucial aspect of the story. The first known occurrence is perhaps in the writings of Marie von Najmajer, who wrote a poem dedicated to Tahirih in Gurret-úl-Eyn: Ein Bild aus Persiens Neuzeit which was published in 1874. After a series of works covering the events of the Bábí period, most of the focus shifted towards Baháʼí specific related connections. Soon Khalil Gibran wrote two books - The Prophet and Jesus, The Son of Man. There is some second-hand evidence for the sustained influence of ʻAbdu'l-Bahá in these works. In modern times the first known occurrence is of a short story by non-Baháʼí Tom Ligon The Devil and the Deep Black Void, - he also wrote a sequel The Gardener. The next fictional publication, in 1991, which references the Baháʼí Faith may be a short story "Home Is Where..." by Baháʼí Maya Kaathryn Bohnhoff,

Initially and occasionally since, reference has been made to the events and figures of the Bábí Faith. As the history and events and coverage of these events in Persia made their way to Europe, coverage tended to shift to the events and figures of the Baháʼí Faith.

== Bábí focus ==
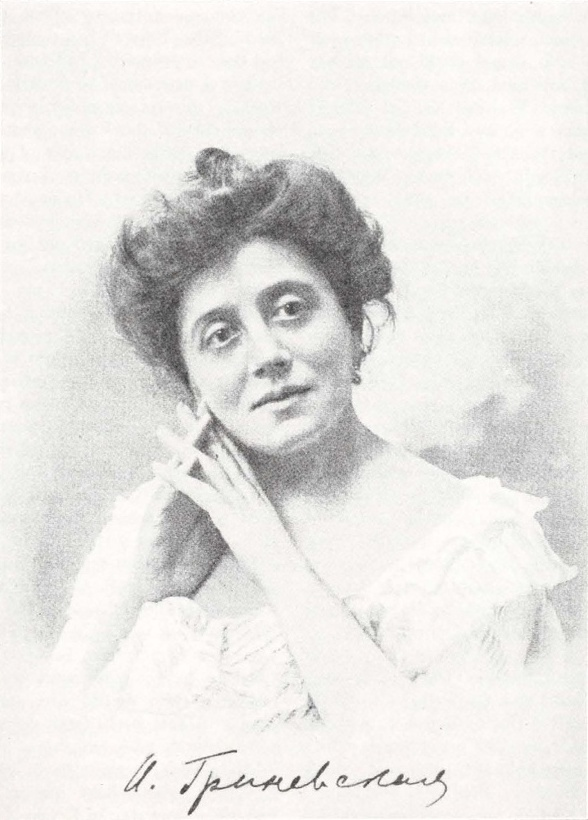
Isabella Grinevskaya

=== Early writers ===
- Austrian Marie von Najmajer wrote a poem dedicated to prominent Bábí and poet Tahireh in Gurret-úl-Eyn: Ein Bild aus Persiens Neuzeit published in 1874.
- José Maria de Eça de Queiroz, a well-known Portuguese novelist in the 19th century, wrote a novel Correspondência de Fradique Mendes in 1889 and spends several pages discussing the religion of the Báb and its impact. The material could not all have been derived from the most widespread review of the religion of the day, the work of Arthur de Gobineau. It is speculated Queiroz encountered followers of the Baháʼí Faith in Egypt sometimes from late 1869 to January 1870. The story is set in 1871.
- A more extensive reference to the events of the Bábí Faith comes from an obscure writer, A. de Saint-Quentin, in the book Un Amour au Pays des Mages in 1891 in the background of many events of the Bábí period.
- Polish/Russian playwright Isabella Grinevskaya wrote the play Báb based on the life and events of the founder of the Bábí Faith which was performed in St. Petersburg in 1904 and again in 1916/7, and lauded by Leo Tolstoy and other reviewers at the time.
- In 1904 Edith Wharton published a short story titled “The Descent of Man” with mention of the Bábí Faith.
- As early as 1908 Constance Faunt Le Roy Runcie attempted to publish a romance novel about the Báb and "Persia's celebrated poetess Zerryn Taj" while living in Missouri, USA.
- The Indianapolis Star, Indianapolis, Indiana, 28 September 1913, printed a story "Number Thirteen by the Master of Mysteries" on pages 64 and 67 of which discusses a note that seemed to indicate the involvement of a Baháʼí woman in a situation.

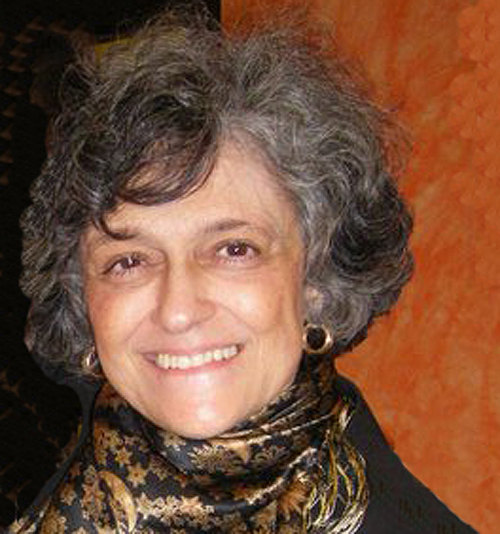
Bahiyyih Nakhjavani

=== Bahiyyih Nakhjavani's books ===
The Saddlebag: A Fable for Doubters and Seekers, a published review of the 2000 publication notes:

[A] day in the life of nine 19th-century characters traveling between Mecca and Medina in this engaging first novel. Though they come from a wide variety of religious, national, and socioeconomic backgrounds, all find themselves in the same caravan when it is beset by a sandstorm and a brutal bandit attack. Each chapter recounts these events from the perspective of its title character, a device Nakhjavani uses skillfully; not only does she avoid the tedium that could result from multiple retellings, but she also turns the bit player in one narrator's story into the complicated hero of another... Nakhjavani shows how God uses their respective religious orientations and the secrets bundled in a saddlebag to reveal life-changing truths to each of them. The novel's Baháʼí message is beautifully rendered in these tales of multiple paths leading to one destination.

Bahiyyih Nakhjavani has published six books - some academic and at least two fictional, as well as articles and poetry.

Another is La femme qui lisait trop (The Woman Who Reads Too Much) in 2007. It tells the story of Táhirih. The writer adopts the revolving points of view, of the mother, sister, daughter and wife respectively, to trace the impact of this woman's actions on her contemporaries and read her prophetic insights regarding her times, and perhaps ours too.

=== Others ===
Nazanin Afshin-Jam was set to play a role as Tahirih in a film by Jack Lenz named Mona's Dream about the life story of Mona Mahmudnizhad.

Sarah Bernhardt, the best-known French actress of her day, asked two of her contemporary authors, Catulle Mendès and Henri Antoine Jules-Bois, to write a play about Tahirih and the Bábís for her to portray on stage.

== Baháʼí focus ==
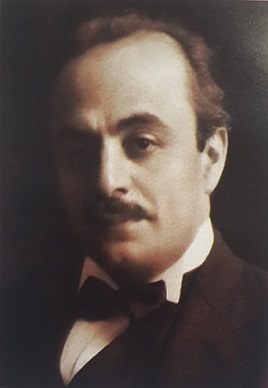
Khalil Gibran

=== Khalil Gibran's books ===
A published account notes about Khalil Gibran:

It was on 6 April 1943, in her studio-room, upstairs at the front of the house, that Juliet shared with me and a few other guests, these memories of Khalil Gibran...

"He lived across the street from here," said Juliet Thompson, "at 51 West 10th. He was neither poor nor rich - in between. Worked on an Arab newspaper; free to paint and write. His health was all right in the early years. He was sad in the later years, because of cancer. He died at forty-nine. He knew his life was ending too soon.

"His drawings were more beautiful than his paintings. These were very misty, lost things - mysterious and lost. Very poetic.

"A Syrian brought him to see me - can't even remember his name. Khalil always said I was his first friend in New York. We became very, very great friends, and all of his books - The Madman, The Forerunner, The Son of Man, The Prophet - I heard in the manuscript. He always gave me his books. I liked The Prophet best. I don't believe that there was any connection between ʻAbdu'l-Bahá and The Prophet. But he told me that he thought of the ʻAbdu'l-Bahá all through. He said that he was going to write another book with 'ʻAbdu'l-Bahá as the center and all the contemporaries of 'ʻAbdu'l-Bahá speaking. He died before he wrote it. He told me definitely that [the book] The Son of Man was influenced by 'ʻAbdu'l-Bahá."

It is known that ʻAbdu'l-Bahá also sat for portraits at the request of Gibran. From the above, it may be concluded that ʻAbdu'l-Bahá and Gibran knew each other more than in passing, but that ʻAbdu'l-Bahá made no formal or informal claims or suggestions about Gibran's writing but cooperated whenever asked (as for sitting for the drawings.) So the influence is really at the choice of Gibran - he could as well have chosen and mentioned any other source of inspiration for his book. It seems he chose ʻAbdu'l-Bahá. As ʻAbdu'l-Bahá is one of the central figures of the Baháʼí Faith and these are works of fiction, it is certainly the case that at least two of Gibran's, and his most famous, are properly mentioned here.

There are many reviews of this famous book, The Prophet. Here's one:

Khalil Gibran's The Prophet is a book that has touched many people very deeply since its publishing in 1923. It has been translated into more than twenty languages, and the American edition alone has sold more than four million copies. It is considered both by Gibran himself and by the general public to be his literary masterpiece. The Prophet is about a man who is leaving a small town called Orphalese where he has made his home for the past twelve years. He has, for that period, been waiting for a boat to take him back to the land of his youth. We are not told where that land is, only that he has been waiting to return there for twelve years. The entire book occurs on the date of his departure. As he is about to leave, the townsfolk stop him in the town and request that he tell them about certain things. He talks to them about life's lessons and imparts his wisdom to them. He is asked about giving, and he tells the people to give without recognition because their reward is their joy. He also talks about things like marriage, work, friendship, and also love. He speaks about each, and more, describing the way that people should deal with each issue. This book is interesting. It is ninety-three pages of life's lessons set down in writing. These are words to live by and tell others to live by. This book is certainly a book that everyone should read. Even if people don't agree with some of the beliefs, they should still read the book, if only to get their mind thinking about life and its many quandaries from a different perspective. This book is not unlike the musings of an aging man imparting his life's lessons to an audience of just about anyone whom he can gather to listen to him. I thoroughly enjoyed this book. Its lessons and stories are wise beyond the ages, and still, hold up to be as true today as they were when Gibran wrote them in 1923. The lessons enumerated within these pages are lessons that one would hope were followed by the general population, and I know that if more people read this book, then the world as a whole might become a more easily survivable place.

Here is one of many reviews of Jesus, The Son of Man:

I find it amazing that he wrote this in the period he did. It's very prophetic, it seems to be in line with a more modern understanding of Jesus that readers of The Course in Miracles and Marianne Williamson are a large part of vocalizing. But even fundamentalists would enjoy this book... being how it is written from the opinion of 80 different points of view, many of which do proclaim him the Son of God. Ultimately, any view can be thoughtfully stimulating because the people of any opinion have personalities and background given that support why they view Jesus with their perspective. The overall impression I received from this beautiful prose is the beauty and message of Jesus, the devotion, admiration, gratitude, and love inspired by him, and the grace which he exuded with confident compassion. And whether he was God, man, a combination of both that we all are potentially, or a combination we can only idolize with an envious self-debasing distorted form of humility, this book shows him to be nothing less than relevant to our comprehension.

Curiously, this is not the only case where someone associated with the Baháʼí Faith wrote a speculative work about things the New Testament is silent on in regards to Jesus. Contemporaries of Gibran Juliet Thompson and Wellesley Tudor Pole wrote books about Jesus. Thompson wrote I, Mary Magdalen and Tudor Pole wrote The Silent Road, A Man Seen Afar, and Writing on the Ground as well as some pamphlets though these were written later in the 20th century. Both Thompson and Tudor Pole knew ʻAbdu'l-Bahá well having interviewed him and worked with him. Thomson wrote a diary, one of the central records of ʻAbdu'l-Bahá's journeys to the West as well as a portrait and Tudor Pole played a significant role in saving his life in World War I. Indeed, the whole relationship between ʻAbdu'l-Bahá and Jesus was one ʻAbdu'l-Bahá was at pains to clarify both to the general public and among early Baháʼís.

=== Tom Ligon's trilogy ===
Among Tom Ligon's many short and medium-sized works (and one award-winning science fact article published in relation to Fusion rocket technology and advocate of Inertial Electrodynamic Fusion), two published in 1986 and 1993, The Devil and the Deep Black Void, and The Gardener in Analog Magazine, are science fiction stories which are about a Shiʻa Muslim terrorist organization in a largely Muslim space-faring civilization where Baháʼís are space colonists who undertake terraforming on a planet they named Mazra'ih (though there is a brief mention of a United States National Spiritual Assembly back on Earth.) The prequel, For a Little Price about how terrorists are prevented from crashing a spaceship into the Earth (long predating the events of the 11 September 2001 attacks) was anthologized in 2008 though work began on it in 1986. In the succeeding stories, some of the terrorists are instead driven to an unusual world orbiting a neutron star where Baháʼís live which eventually reveals that civilizations have reached great levels of technology and then mysteriously disappeared. The initial thought is that the civilizations are eradicated by periodic sterilization the planet undergoes but there is also evidence the civilizations vanished peacefully before the sterilization speculating that civilizations shortly after achieving deep space exploration reach some new level of civilization that doesn't require or sustain material civilization in deep space. The ethical conflict of pacifism, a debatable stance associated with the Baháʼí Faith, in the face of terrorists is worked out. One character, who takes on the name of the historical Bábí who performed an assassination attempt on the life of the Shah of Iran, chooses the path of violence in defense of the population by way (as portrayed) of matching a strength of the Baháʼí Faith in acceptance of science compared to a weakness of Shia Islam of superstition.

The author comments:

"The Devil and the Deep Black Void" had an interesting genesis. I remember being outraged by reports coming from the far east. Vietnamese boat people were being preyed on by pirates. I set up a situation where a political upset in a distant colony would make it likely that refugees would be preyed on by pirates. However, the story developed a mind of its own. I realized that, due to the vastness of space, the pirates would be easy to evade. The real threat was the vastness itself. Running away was certain death, and the only hope was returning to face the original problem. That quickly became the focus of the story...

I needed good victims. Recent news had offered an excellent group, the Baha'is, who had been persecuted in Iran. The more I researched them, the more convinced I became that they would make excellent space colonists. My primary reference was an aged primer on the Baháʼí Faith by J. E. Esselmont. I did receive some comments from several Baháʼís suggesting that I'd portrayed them as too pacifistic, however, I'll stick by my guns on this. My characters, while they believe in public defense, even armies, to preserve peace, are stubborn in living by a passage I found in Esselmont's book in which Baha'u'llah forbids the Baháʼís from taking up arms in the defense of the faith. The story is carefully crafted to back them into this corner. Our hero is faced with a loss of his faith, which enables him to take action to save his people, but leaves him in a spiritual dilemma.

I left him in that state for about 7 years, when I had the inspiration for the sequel, "The Gardener". Hoping to give Hab, our hero, some hint of faith back, not to mention some much-needed feminine companionship, I devised a story to show what he'd been up to in seven years of self-imposed exile on a remote continent of a planet just begging for life."

Among the special qualities of Mr. Ligon's contribution to the Baháʼí Faith in fiction is that he is not a Baháʼí, the stories mentioned explicitly reference the religion, and indeed the religion provides some of the central contexts for the storyline, and possibly the first publication to seriously reference the Baháʼí Faith in fictional literature context. See Persecution of Baháʼís, Baháʼí Faith in Turkmenistan and Baháʼí Faith in Azerbaijan for cases of Baháʼí responses to violence. The final publication, "For a Little Price", is part of an anthology, A Mosque Among the Stars, that is free for download.

=== Maya Kaathryn Bohnhoff's works ===
Bohnhoff has won several awards for her works of fiction and music (especially filk music which is music tied to science fiction or related styles or issues).

Bohnhoff's first work to use the Baháʼí Faith as a central aspect of a story may be her 1991 published "Home Is Where..." novelette summarized as "A Baha'i family from the year 2112 is on a time travel research assignment in the midwest USA, in 1950." There has not been a published review of her work noting the presence of the Baháʼí Faith in her works generally. Her first publication was in 1989 and her publications continue through 2006. Bohnhoff, mother of two and married since 1981 (both true at least as of 2001), has also written many short stories and novelettes, some of them with a significant basis in relation to the Baháʼí Faith, in most of the well known publishing magazines: Analog Magazine, Interzone, Amazing Stories, Realms of Fantasy, and others. Another example "The White Dog" wherein a lady whose shocking albino appearance is eventually warmly loved by the special relationship pointed out by ʻAbdu'l-Bahá for a little white dog. Her longest work with a strong presence of the Baháʼí Faith is The Meri fantasy series which is a trilogy (The Meri published in 1992, Taminy in 1993, and The Crystal Rose in 1995). The series revolves around the period of transition among the people who live on a peninsula. The chapters are headed with quotes from scripture presented as those of the religion of the people but many are quotes from Baháʼí scripture, while a few are from the Bible. The first and second book also carries an acknowledgement of Baháʼu'lláh, a Local Spiritual Assembly and Baháʼí community. The plot involves a progression in the understanding of a person about the role and position of women. Unknown to the people of the story, women have always been instrumental to their religion as agents of God and a chosen few have always acted as the personification of the Spirit of God, or "Meri". The first book focuses on a young girl destined to take on that role. While similar to other stories of the triumph of women it has several unique qualities most particularly a central male character being her benefactor and teacher and not an obstacle she has to overcome. The second book focuses on the return of the prior "Meri" who takes it as her mission to promulgate the new paradigm as the head of the religion. The third book focuses on her transition to being ahead of state but wrestling with several of the same issues from among as well as beyond her people. Another novel she has written called The Spirit Gate has many of the same features but is written in a different context - a fantasy work set in a historical time and place of roughly 1000AD in the area today of Poland and Ukraine where two forms of Christianity and Islam met the pagan older religion. Baháʼí themes, especially in the respect granted to other religions, are largely identified with the older religion, however, the names of some of the central figures of the religion appear near the end without strongly hinting at any spiritual prominence (names of an ambassador and Caliph, not simply religious figures.)

Among Bohnhoff's contributions to the Baháʼí Faith in fiction is that she has had more than three dozen works published in many major and some minor publishing venues. She has written at least 6 full-length novels of her own - four with strong Baháʼí references though mentioning something about the religion in the others. In combination, she has probably subtlety or directly presented themes of the Baháʼí Faith to the widest audience in literature. An anthology of many of her stories was published as I Loved Thy Creation which is available for download for free.

=== Joseph Sheppherd's The Island of the Same Name ===
Baháʼí Joseph Sheppherd uses his wide experience living in many countries and professional knowledge as an anthropologist and archaeologist to write an embracing story about the adventures and discoveries of spiritual leaders bound to an island off Africa. The center pivotal periods of the story revolve around two generations of researchers: an archaeologist and his anthropologist daughter. Each, in turn, visits the same African island, but takes vastly different discoveries as the story travels in four different periods: humanity's distant past, near past, near future, and far future. Published in 1997 the near past and future are near enough to have their relative positions significantly altered - the 1970s for the first and the 2000s for the second, roughly now. This book is over 500 pages long and covers a wide range of topics in careful detail from the practicalities of stone ax making, through archeological digs in tyrannical third-world countries, spiritual values expressed among aboriginal peoples of the world and the practical lives of individual people occasioned by mystical experiences and those around them, and so on. It follows the form of addressing life at different times and thus a kind of science fiction, but like other entries in this article emphasizes the inward issues and spiritual discoveries more than the quasi-magical or technological leaps made as part of the plot. Mr. Shepperd prefers the term "social fiction" rather than science fiction. The Baháʼís, or any paraphrases of principles of the religion, are at best obliquely referred to until late in the second section, of the near past, when an Iranian Doctor mentions the Baháʼí Faith and his reasons for living in a place far from his home and how the principles of the religion stand in the context of the international challenges and needs of humanity. A key character in the book shows interest and later joins the religion but aside from a few specifics there is no clear statement of the future position of the religion nor how the future world culture was established (brief references to a dual process that has merged before the distant future, but doesn't state explicitly what place the Baháʼí Faith has in this pattern.) However, in the header of each section there is a text presented with a dating scheme that is exactly that of the Baháʼí calendar so for example 2007 of the common calendar is year 163 of the Baháʼí Era, or BE. While the textual reference is exact it only becomes clear when the two dating schemes are cross-referenced and the explicit mention of the religion had already been made. Late in the story, the Universal House of Justice is mentioned as having 19 members, and a metropolis called Haifaakka is mentioned. However, the Baháʼí Faith is not framed as the singular or dominant theme of the story - it is but an explicit component of the plot occasionally and a subtext for specifics recognizable but not identified as specifically related to the religion. In other words, the majority of the content of the book describes how the world at large arrives at a Baháʼí oriented future, but not how the Baháʼí Faith itself arrives to be in that position.

Mr. Sheppherd has published about 10 works before the year 2000 (and lost an additional 15 unpublished works in a house fire in 2002) ranging from professional publications to Baháʼí centered works whether of formal introduction or children's literature, poetry or this science/speculative fiction analysis of the multi-century changes based on humanity's response to a religion centered in the non-west, specifically an African island.

=== Arvid Nelson's Rex Mundi ===
Rex Mundi is an American comic book published by Dark Horse Comics written by Baháʼí Arvid Nelson. It was first published in 2002 and has run through 2008.

The series is a quest for the Holy Grail told as a murder mystery. It is set in the year 1933, in an alternate history Europe, where magic is real, feudalism persisted, and the Protestant Reformation was crushed by a still politically powerful Roman Catholic Church. All of this is woven together as "... a meditation on the prophecies surrounding the advent of the Baháʼí era". Nelson compares a central character Genevieve with the role of the Baháʼí Faith - of trying to bring about unity but the story is not used as a means to proselytize the religion.

=== TK Ralya's The Golden Age: the Thy Kingdom Come ===
Official synopsis: "After one of his friends is killed in Iraq, Geoffrey Waters prays for help in understanding God's purpose for humanity. He is whisked forward in time to witness what a world could be like when the prophecies from Isaiah bring about peace on earth, and the lines 'Thy kingdom come, thy will be done on earth as it is in heaven' come to fruition. The people on the planet he visits explain that God's kingdom will be established on Earth no matter what, even if a horrible calamity must occur." The Baháʼí author notes that this book is her impression of what the future may be like based on the premise of fulfilled Biblical prophecy, with specifics from Baháʼí sources. There are several quotes and paraphrases from the Baháʼí writings as well as examples of attitudes among various characters that believe as guided by these references, and the book was approved by the Special Materials Review Committee. Directly it only refers to the Baháʼí Faith as one of many religions mentioned in the foreword (which also mentions that it is meant to be the first of a trilogy.) Internally the strongest reference perhaps is the name of the Book of the religion of the future - "Qadas", which is similar to "Aqdas" - the central Book of Laws, of the Baháʼí Faith. However "Qadas" could also be rather more obscure references ("the holiness of God", or a Muslim style of prayer for example.) The overall feel of the story is much like Madeleine L'Engle's A Wrinkle in Time - of grand themes being played out not through technological achievements, but of spiritual beings and achievements. Ralya has also published children's stories, two full-length musicals, a weekly newspaper column in a Minnesota paper for about 2 years, and a novel for 9- to 15-year-olds which also has significant reference to the Baháʼí Faith.

Doing the Impossible official synopsis mentions "three fifteen-year-old girls are starting their second year of high school. The 'impossible' thing they are trying to do is living according to God's standards in modern society. Megan gets the lead in the high school play, but her character is a rather 'loose' woman. Her leading man is more interested in 'fun' than appropriateness... Ashley has a learning disability and wrestles with feeling dumb and unattractive. Brittney is very smart but overweight. She deals with her body image as well as where a smart female fits in society without being considered aggressive. Baháʼí school on Sunday mornings adds the different perspectives of other students."

The unique contribution Ralya has made to the Baháʼí Faith in fiction is that her works center on the moral dilemmas of modern society in the west and spiritual insights and development that reflect an understanding of the teachings of the Baháʼí Faith in response to these challenges. On the one hand, she has envisioned an attainable utopia (that is, not completely perfect) with specifics based on suggestions made in writings of the Baháʼí Faith. A particularly strong analysis is made of marital fidelity vs the divine law against adultery vs intense love and friendship between a man and a woman not married, though many topics are addressed including the moral and practical need for war, sustainable economics if children and mothers are of central importance to society, attitudes of the oneness of humanity vs racism, the importance of the arts and so on. On the other hand, she has examined many of the same issues in young ladies' lives in high school.

=== Karen Anne Webb's Adventurers of the Croatian Union series ===
Late in 2006, "The Chalice of Life" was released by Dragon Moon Press, a small Canadian press specializing in science fiction and fantasy. Webb's book, while intended as a fantasy adventure, includes many themes from the Baháʼí Writings, including quotes from a variety of faith traditions and a fantasy version of a society based on the fully realized society of the future envisioned by Baha'u'llah. Central to the plot (although the idea is referred to rather than explained with great explicitness in the first book) is the idea of the School of Transcendent Oneness and the idea that a special class of being is sent into Creation from time to time to help civilization along. She relates this to the "once and future king" concept with the introduction of the quest that forms the overall theme for the series: the search for Eliander, a Carotian prince magicked away long ago to a place outside normal space-time. In the second book, "Tapestry of Enchantment," Dragon Moon Press, 2010 this theme of the once and future king comes to the fore when the one character from a world outside the Carotian Union (the system Eliander's return is meant to save) discloses that he believes he is living in the time of his own world's Promised One; his search for this Promised One becomes a strong theme in the series and become the pivot point of the sequel. "Lamp of Truth," the third book, is due for publication in early 2011. Dragon Moon has contracted the entire series, the longest work it has ever put under contract and hopes to release the remainder of the books at the rate of about one every six months (slating Eliander for release sometime in late 2013). Remaining books in the series and their settings include "The Life of the Smith" (ancient Greece); "The Floodwaters of Redemption" (Mu right before it founders); "The Treasure of Mobius" (a world projected by a powerful projective telepath; yes, it has one-sided buildings); "Dwellers in the Underdark" (the Underdark, home of the terrifying Azhur race); and "The King That Will Be" (variously the planes of incarceration of the quest's nemesis and Eliander as well as a home on Carlos).

=== Jackie Mehrabi's books ===
Jackie Mehrabi has written several fiction books for children and young teens, often about the lives of fictional Baháʼís with a moral message behind each tale, and received the 2011 Joe Foster Award for Services to Education as a writer.

=== Mark Perry's plays ===
University of North Carolina at Chapel Hill faculty member Mark Perry has written three plays on the religion's history and teachings: On the Rooftop with Bill Sears as a quasi-biography of Bill Sears, Band of Gold about a Persian-American couple getting married, and A new dress for Mona (revised from the original A dress for Mona, a finalist for the 2003 Triangle Theatre Awards for best original screenplay,) about the life and death of Mona Mahmudnizhad, that have been anthologized as The Lover at the Wall: 3 Plays on Baha'i Subjects.

=== Sarah Woodbury's medieval Welsh fiction ===
Sarah Woodbury (née Haug) is a Baháʼí author of historical fiction set in medieval Wales. An anthropologist by training, she has published more than fifty novels across several series, including the After Cilmeri time-travel series and the Gareth and Gwen Medieval Mysteries.

Woodbury's novels do not contain overt Baháʼí characters, scripture, or thematic content. Her works focus on the history of Wales following the Edwardian Conquest of 1282, frequently exploring the assassination of Llywelyn ap Gruffydd and posing the alternate-history question of what might have occurred had he survived. The After Cilmeri series uses time travel as a narrative device to re-examine this historical turning point, while the Gareth and Gwen series presents murder mysteries in the same period.

Woodbury has stated that her anthropological background informs her approach to historical fiction, treating it as "anthropology of the past" — an effort to understand why people acted as they did and to render a distant culture comprehensible to modern readers. She also contributes a column to FāVS News (a faith, values, and ethics publication based in Spokane, Washington) in which she shares perspectives rooted in her Baháʼí Faith. She is a member of the Historical Fiction Author Cooperative, the Historical Novel Society, and Novelists, Inc.

== Other books ==
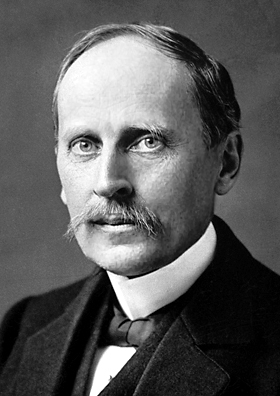
Romain Rolland

- British novelist E. S. Drower's 1911 novel The Mountain of God revolves around the lives of the Baháʼís in the Haifa-Akka area and is a thinly veiled set of characters showing the influence of ʻAbdu'l-Bahá in the community.
- In American novelist Gertrude Atherton's 1912 novel Julia France and Her Times, a character named Julia goes to Akka to meet ʻAbdu'l-Bahá, returns to England and convinces her friend to write a book about the Baháʼís.
- A story from Canadian humorist Stephen Butler Leacock's 1914 book Arcadian Adventures with the Idle Rich, "The Yahi-Bahi Oriental Society of Mrs. Rasselyer-Brown," features a character that caricatures ʻAbdu'l-Bahá
- Recipient of the 1915 Nobel Prize in Literature, French novelist and dramatist Romain Rolland, has a character recite a passage from Some Answered Questions by ʻAbdu'l-Bahá in his 1920 novel Clérambault: The Story of an Independent Spirit During the War in the closing pages.
- Philip K. Dick's 1957 science-fiction novel Eye in the Sky features a parallel world theocracy dominated by a church of the "Second Bab." However, no attempt is made to explore the Baháʼí Faith; it reads like a satire of Christian Fundamentalism.
- James A. Michener's 1965 novel The Source mentions the golden dome of the Shrine of the Báb as, "...golden dome of the Baha'i temple...".
- The futuristic hero of Robert Sheckley's 1965 science-fiction novel Mindswap, "Like everyone else, ...had worshipped in the Bahai temple in Haifa."
- In Chilean author Isabel Allende's 1991 novel El Plan Infinito (The Infinite Plan), the main character, Greg Reeves, engages in a search for meaning and identity. His mother is a Baháʼí . She is portrayed in a somewhat negative light.
- Joe Haldeman's 2007 science-fiction novel The Accidental Time Machine mentions "...B'hai all over the place...". in the Western United States two thousand years in the future.
- Zendegi (2010) by Greg Egan lists a number of groups held in Evin Prison in Iran. "This is where Baha'i ended up, for the crime of believing in one prophet too many,..."
- The 2014 novel In the Name of God, the Merciful, the Compassionate by Tim Parise features a Baháʼí character who is a member of a nonviolent resistance movement opposing the Iranian government.
- Three Baháʼís escaping from Iran, afloat in wreckage in the Arabian Sea, are rescued by a U.S. Navy ship in the 2015 novel Tipping Point, by David Poyer.
- Alan Manifold's 2018 novel, Consulting Detective is a murder mystery featuring a Baháʼí police detective, Mihdi Montgomery. There are numerous references to Baháʼí activities such as the Nineteen-Day Feast and Local Spiritual Assembly meetings, as well as a subplot involving looking for a new Baháʼí Center in the fictional Chicago suburb of Pine Bluff.

== Other popular media ==
In 1959, Come Back, Africa, a film about Apartheid, mentions the religion as part of the discussion on the philosophical underpinnings of how the Africans were to respond to the challenge of Apartheid. The mention of the religion begins about 1 hr. 10 min into the film, after the performance of Miriam Makeba. It is not known if the cause of the mention of the religion was scripted or improvised, and if by the choice of Lionel Rogosin, the filmmaker (who may have encountered the religion in Israel or the USA) or the Africans themselves because of their exposure to the religion in the country.

In addition to being mentioned directly in a number of works, the Baháʼí Faith and/or its teachings have also been mentioned in the TV and movie industry. For example, the TV series The Simpsons has twice referenced the Baháʼís - once when Lisa Simpson is considering what religion to join in the episode "She of Little Faith" she sees "Bed, Bath and Baháʼí" on a sign (she ends up converting to Buddhism) and also when Bart Simpson is playing Billy Graham's Bible Blaster, a Christian video game (where the player has to convert heathens to Christianity) "a gentle Baha'i" is one of the images on the screen at Ned Flanders' house in the episode "Alone Again, Natura-Diddily".

The movie The Matrix uses parallel terminology to the Baháʼí Faith but there is little evidence that the movie or its makers were influenced by the religion specifically (more likely Buddhism and Gnostic Christianity). However, a movie critic did use the Baháʼí Faith as the lead off in his review.

There was also a TV medical-drama in Australia called MDA - Medical Defense Australia (MDA (TV series)) which went on the air on 23 July 2002 with an ongoing Baháʼí character, Layla Young, who is played by actress Petra Yared who is not a Baháʼí.

The role-playing game Trinity by White Wolf Game Studio, in a futuristic setting, includes a faction called the Interplanetary School for Research and Advancement. Many of its members are humans with psionic powers related to clairsentience. The leader, and as a result many of his followers, is a member of the Baháʼí Faith. A second role-playing game, this one based in computer technology, is called The Seven Valleys named after The Seven Valleys and uses it explicitly as inspirations for its adventures.

The 14 April 2012 episode of a Prairie Home Companion's News from Lake Wobegone has the character Pastor Liz stopped by a highway patrolman who had grown up Lutheran from a family of Lutherans when he met and married a Baháʼí (Sasha) and converted. The section occurs from about 101:25 through 104:55 minutes.

In 2015 the TV show Backstrom, the character Sgt. Peter Niedermayer quotes religious figures in the show - he quotes Baháʼu'llah in the premiere episode at about 17:22-17:32 into the show.

The 2018 movie Blackpowder and Guilt features a rural family who was not explicitly stated to be Baháʼí, but who chanted a Baháʼí prayer at the dinner table. The main character was also seen wearing a nine-pointed star pendant throughout the film, a well-known Baháʼí symbol.

== See also ==
- Dawn Breakers International Film Festival
- LDS fiction
- New religious movements and cults in popular culture
- Parody religion
- Religious satire
- Spiritualism in fiction

== Further study ==
- Collins, William P. (1990). Bibliography of English-language Works on the Bábí and Baháʼí Faiths. Oxford, UK: George Ronald. ISBN 978-0-85398-315-6.
