= Above the Battle =

1914–1915 articles by Romain Rolland

Above the Battle (Au-dessus de la mêlée) is a text about the First World War written by the French author and pacifist Romain Rolland on September 15, 1914. The text was subsequently published by Journal de Genève on September 22. It is also the title of a collected series of articles written by Rolland while he was in Switzerland during the opening months of the conflict. These articles, which appeared in a diverse collection of periodicals from August 29, 1914, through August 1, 1915, were collected and published by Paul Ollendorff.

== Genesis of the title ==
The article was originally titled Above Hate. Rolland made last minute changes to the text in order to adopt the new title, as he probably found the first edition to be too conventional and bland. The final title earned the ire of the public, with many anonymous letters accusing Rolland of sympathizing with the Germans via the moniker "the German Rolland." The chosen title gave the impression that the author attached no importance to the on-going conflict and considered himself as above the battle. The text was, in fact, merely a call for all men to look at the conflict with a bit of perspective or from "above the battle."

== Reception ==
At the beginning of November 1915, the press announced that the Nobel Prize in Literature was to be awarded to Rolland. This was seen by French nationalist intellectuals as an affront to their national honor. A few days later, amid heavy criticism in the press, and perhaps due to diplomatic pressure, the Swedish Academy announced that it would not award a prize in literature for 1915. The following year, however, it awarded the prize to Rolland as a "tribute to the great idealism of his writings as well as for the sympathy and truth with which he painted different types of humans." According to an article published in the Revue d'Histoire littéraire de la France, if "the sympathy" and "the truth with which he painted different types of humans" referred to his novel Jean-Christophe, "obviously, 'the idealism of his writings' does not only target Jean-Christophe, but also Au-dessus de la mêlée, which earned Rolland so many insults in the warmongering camp."

The Swiss pamphleteer William Vogt wrote a response to his text in 1916.

== Bibliography ==
- Rolland, Romain. "Au-dessus de la mêlée." Journal de Genève n. 260 (September 22, 1914). (online).
- Rolland, Romain. Above the Battle. Translated by Charles Kay Ogden. London: George Allen & Uwin LTD., 1916. (Wikisource).
- Rolland, Romain and Bernard Duchatelet. Preface by Christophe Prochasson. Au-dessus de la mêlée. Paris: Payot, coll. "Petit Bibliothèque Payot" (n. 906), 2013. ISBN 978-2-228-90875-7
