= Clérambault =

Clérambault or de Clérambault may refer to:

- Louis-Nicolas Clérambault (1676–1749), French organist and composer
- Gaëtan Gatian de Clérambault (1872–1934), French psychiatrist
- Philippe de Clérambault de La Palluau (1606–1665), Marshal of France
- Philippe de Clérambault, Count de Palluau, son of Philippe, lieutenant general, killed (drowned) at the Battle of Blenheim
- Jules de Clérambault (c. 1660–1714), son of Philippe, ecclesiastic and member of the Académie française
- Clérambault (novel), Romain Rolland's 1920 war novel
