= Baháʼí Faith in Turkey =

The Baháʼí Faith bears a strong bond to the nation of Turkey as Baháʼu'lláh, the founder of the religion, was exiled to Constantinople, current-day Istanbul, by the Ottoman authorities during the formative days of the religion. Since the establishment of the Baháʼí Faith in Turkey's predecessor state, the Ottoman Empire, and in Turkey, the legal standing of the religion has been contested as progressively wider scales of organization of the religion have been attempted by the community. In the 21st century, many of the obstacles to the religion remain in place, as Baháʼís cannot register with the government officially. Despite this, members do not face significant persecution due to the separation of religion and state in Turkey, and there are estimated to be 10,000 to 20,000 Baháʼís and around one hundred Baháʼí Local Spiritual Assemblies in Turkey.

== Early phase ==
Many of the important geographic areas of the early period of the Baháʼí Faith were historically controlled by the Ottoman Empire, from which Turkey came about after the Empire's dissolution in the 1920s. The first interaction between the history of the religion and what is present-day Turkey occurred when Mullá 'Alíy-i-Bastámí, who was a Bábi—the immediate predecessor religion associated with the Baháʼí Faith—was arrested in Ottoman-controlled Baghdad for teaching the religion and sent as a prisoner to Istanbul in 1846.

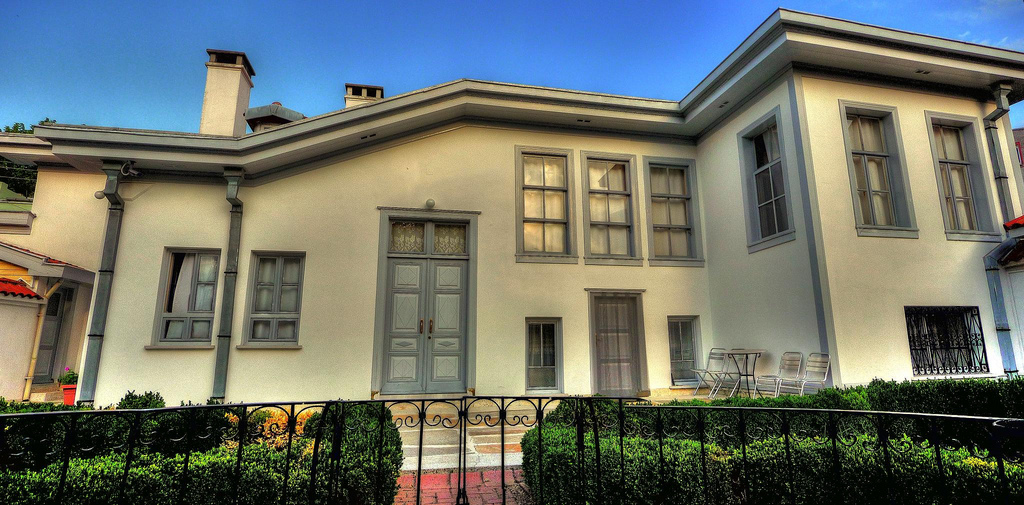
The house where Baháʼu'lláh stayed in Edirne

In 1863, when Baháʼu'lláh, the founder of the religion, was in Baghdad due to his banishment from Persia, he was further exiled by the Ottoman government from Baghdad to Istanbul. He was later exiled to Edirne in the western part of Turkey, and ultimately to Acre in current-day Israel. While in Istanbul and Edirne the followers of the religion started to become known as Baháʼís, and a significant portion of Baháʼu'lláh's writings were written while he was in current-day Turkey. While much of the writings were written in Arabic or Persian, the central figures of the Baháʼí Faith have written in Turkish, though most of the early Baháʼí literature in Turkish was printed by the large Baháʼí communities in Baku Azerbaijan and Ashkhabad.

== Growth ==
=== Developments along Western Turkey ===
Baháʼís have lived in the territory of modern Turkey since Baháʼu'lláh's time. Other Baháʼís have come from other places to be in Constantinople in this period around 1910. After joining the religion in 1906 in the United States Stanwood Cobb taught history and Latin at Robert College in Constantinople in the period 1907–1910 and undertook travels to see ʻAbdu'l-Bahá. In succeeding years, Cobb wrote several works dealing with Turkey - The Real Turk, ISBN B000NUP6SI, 1914, Ayesha of the Bosphorus, 1915, and Islamic Contributions to Civilization in 1963. Wellesley Tudor Pole had been pursuing investigations in the Middle East and visited Constantinople where he heard of ʻAbdu'l-Bahá in 1908 and soon became a Baháʼí. The woman known as Isabella Grinevskaya moved from Odesa Ukraine after gaining some notability as a playwright to Constantinople and after meeting ʻAbdu'l-Bahá on a trip to Egypt became a member of the Baháʼí Faith. In 1913, ʻAbdu'l-Bahá, Baháʼu'lláh's son and successor, commented that the religion was spreading into the interior of Turkey. Süleyman Nazif is a prominent poet and thinker from Turkey at the turn of the 20th century who was challenged to learn more of the religion while in Paris, by the poet Catulle Mendès. Investigating the religion, including meeting with ʻAbdu'l-Bahá a number of times and becoming an admirer of Tahirih, Nazif wrote about various facets of these encounters and history in several books - though they contain errors they can be considered an important alternative source on early views of Baháʼí history. Martha Root, a Baháʼí teacher, visited Turkey in 1927, 1929, and 1932. Following the rise of Secularism in Turkey, the Turkish government, around 1928, decided to order the police in the town of Smyrna to conduct a close investigation into the purpose, the character and the effects of Baháʼí activity in that town. Mentioned in the morning papers the next day, the chairman of the Baháʼí Local Spiritual Assembly of Constantinople travelled to offer the necessary explanations to the authorities concerned but he and the rest of the assembly were all arrested, and Baháʼí literature in their homes was seized. However their books were returned and there was widespread publicity in leading newspapers of Turkey leading to the government lifting the ban on the Baháʼís.

=== Developments spread east ===
Sometime before 1930, Sami Doktoroglu came in contact with the religion, and became a Baháʼí. He would later become an important member of the religion in Turkey, and as part of the community of Birecik. Despite the earlier situation where the ban on the religion was removed, further waves of arrests of Baháʼís spread through Urfa, Adana and Gaziantep. In the winter of 1951, the visit to Istanbul of Amelia Collins, a Baháʼí teacher, was facilitated by Doktoroglu. He made hotel reservations and greeted her at the airport with a large group of Baháʼís. Several meetings were arranged at which she could meet groups of Baháʼís and a large banquet was given in her honour. Doktoroglu then went on Baháʼí pilgrimage and on his return a letter dated 14 December 1951 written on behalf of the head of the religion reached the believers in Istanbul encouraging the friends to establish a Local Spiritual Assembly and to pursue other tasks concerning which he had given instructions to Doktoroglu. In April 1952 the Local Spiritual Assembly of (now renamed) Istanbul was formed with Doktoroglu as one of its members. Years later Doktoroglu was successful in obtaining permission to search the government archives. Among his findings was an indication that Mulla ʻAláy-i-Bastámí had in his travels reached the city of Bolu, east of Istanbul.

=== Further developments and problems ===
By the late 1950s Baháʼí communities existed across many of the cities and towns Baháʼu'lláh passed through on his passage in Turkey. In 1959 the Baháʼí National Spiritual Assembly of Turkey was formed with the help of ʻAlí-Akbar Furútan, a Hand of the Cause — an individual considered to have achieved a distinguished rank in service to the religion. Among the members of the National Spiritual Assembly was Masíh Farhangí who had previously served on the Baháʼí National Spiritual Assembly of Iran; he had his family had pioneered from Iran to Turkey around 1959 and both he and his wife were registered as graduate students in a medical college. Even though Farhangí was elected secretary of the body, he was ejected from Turkey at the end of that year.

Repeating the pattern of arrests in the 1920s and 30s, in 1959 during Naw Ruz mass arrests of the Baháʼí local assembly of Ankara resulted in the religion being accused of being a forbidden Tariqah, or sect of Islam. The court requested three experts in comparative religion to give their opinion: two of the three experts supported viewing the Baháʼí Faith as an independent religion, and one claimed that it was a sect of Islam. After this report, the court appointed three respected religious scholars to review all aspects of the question and advise the court of their views. All three of these scholars agreed that the religion was independent on January 17, 1961. However the judges chose to disregard these findings and on July 15, 1961, declared that the Baháʼí Faith was a forbidden sect but this decision was appealed to the Turkish Supreme Court.

Starting in 1960 until 1990, however, Baháʼís could register with the government when the Interior Ministry issued instructions introducing a new standardized code system that did not include the religion, a situation similar to the current Egyptian identification card controversy.

=== Re-establishment of the National Assembly and further issues ===
By 1963, there were 12 Baháʼí local assemblies in the country, and the number grew to 22 assemblies by the end of 1973. The National Assembly was able to be reestablished in 1974, and by 1986 there were 50 local assemblies. But turmoil continued when on August 6, 1996, 21 Iranians (8 men, 4 women and 9 children, the youngest of whom is 4 years old), approached the United Nations High Commissioner for Refugees (UNHCR) in Ankara to request asylum from Iran. UNHCR officials registered their names and informed them of new regulations which require asylum seekers to apply within five days to the police in the city where they entered the country. The asylum seekers were issued documents by the UNHCR indicating their intention for requesting asylum from the local Turkish police. They boarded a chartered bus and arrived in Agri, the city of their entrance, the next morning. However the group disappeared — with various reports suggesting they were returned to Iranian authorities.

== Modern community ==
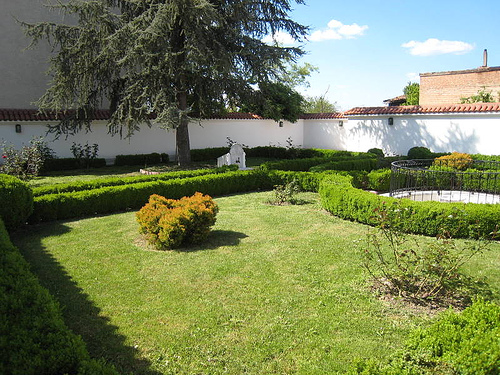
Gardens of the House of Baha'u'llah in Edirne

Since its inception the religion has had involvement in socio-economic development beginning by giving greater freedom to women, promulgating the promotion of female education as a priority concern, and that involvement was given practical expression by creating schools, agricultural coops, and clinics. The religion entered a new phase of activity when a message of the Universal House of Justice dated 20 October 1983 was released. Baháʼís were urged to seek out ways, compatible with the Baháʼí teachings, in which they could become involved in the social and economic development of the communities in which they lived. Worldwide in 1979 there were 129 officially recognized Baháʼí socio-economic development projects. By 1987, the number of officially recognized development projects had increased to 1482. However, in Turkey things are complicated. Baháʼís still arrive in Turkey as refugees from the Persecution of Baháʼís in Iran. But matters in Turkey are hardly supportive. Despite a 2006 regulation allowing persons to leave the religion section of their identity cards blank or change the religious designation by written application, the government continued to restrict applicants' choice of religion. Despite the regulation, applicants must choose Muslim, Christian, Jew, Hindu, Zoroastrian, Confucian, Taoist, Buddhist, Religionless, Other, or Unknown as their religious affiliation so individuals can't be registered as Baháʼís. Additionally there are still instances of harassment and property has been confiscated. In February 2001 the Baháʼí community lost a legal appeal against government expropriation of a sacred site near Edirne; the Ministry of Culture had previously granted heritage status to the site in 1993. In January 2001 two Baháʼís were detained for proselytizing in Sivas while a local imam commenting on the arrest made a public rebuke alluding to those "whose killing is necessary." Still in 2001, two Baháʼí university professors at Sivas' Cumhuriyet University faced expulsion. in 2008, a Baháʼí was appointed dean of the Science and Letters Faculty of the Middle East Technical University. The Turkish government supported the declaration of the Presidency of the European Union when he "denounced" the trial of Iranian Baháʼís announced in February 2009.

=== Demographics ===
Because the religion is proscribed there can be no official counts of membership. Estimates by others range from 10,000 to 20,000. The Association of Religion Data Archives (relying on World Christian Encyclopedia) estimated some 21,000 Baháʼís in Turkey - and some 880 in Cyprus. The US State Department estimated the Turkish Cypriot Baháʼí community of approximately 200 in 2008. There are about a hundred local spiritual assemblies in modern Turkey.

== See also ==
- Baháʼí Faith by country
- Religion in Turkey
- History of Turkey
- Baháʼí timeline
