= Baháʼí Faith in Georgia (country) =

The Baháʼí Faith in Georgia began with its arrival in the region in 1850 through its association with the precursor religion the Bábí Faith during the lifetime of Baháʼu'lláh. During the period of Soviet policy of religious oppression, the institutions of the Baháʼís in the Soviet Republics were progressively dissolved and so disappeared from communication with Baháʼís elsewhere. However, in 1963 an individual was identified in Tbilisi. Following Perestroika the first Baháʼí Local Spiritual Assembly of Georgia formed in 1991 and Georgian Baháʼís elected their first National Spiritual Assembly in 1995. The religion is noted as growing in Georgia. The Association of Religion Data Archives (relying on World Christian Encyclopedia) estimated some 1,588 Baháʼís in 2005.

== Early period ==
From 1850 onwards, small groups of Bábís spread across the Caucasus including Georgia. Jamshíd-i-Gurjí is a noted member of the religion from Georgia who lived in the lifetime of Baháʼu'lláh. He was arrested in Constantinople and subsequently rather than being banished with Baháʼu'lláh's party to Akka or others to Cyprus, he was deported to Persia though in transit he was released by the Kurds.

By the time the effects of the October Revolution began to spread across the Russian Empire transforming it into the Soviet Union, Baháʼís had spread through much of Soviet territory. And initially the religion still grew in organization when the election of the regional National Assembly of the Baháʼís of the Caucasus and Turkistan took place in 1925. However, with the Soviet policy of religious oppression, the Baháʼís, strictly adhering to their principle of obedience to legal government, abandoned its administration and any properties were nationalized. As the institutions of the Baháʼís in the Soviet Republics were progressively dissolved and so disappeared from communication with Baháʼís elsewhere. It is known that many were imprisoned and died, some were deported to Siberia, though most were deported to Iran. In 1953 Baháʼís started to move to the Soviet Republics in Asia, after the head of the religion at the time, Shoghi Effendi, initiated a plan called the Ten Year Crusade. At the culmination of this plan, in 1963, various centers were restored in the region including Georgia, where there was an individual Baháʼí identified in Tbilisi.

== Modern community ==
It was not until the onset of Perestroika that the Baháʼís began to meet and organize again. The first Local Spiritual Assembly of Georgia to form was in 1991 in Tbilisi. After being part of the regional national assembly with Russia since 1992, Georgian Baháʼís elected their first National Spiritual Assembly in 1995 with Hand of the Cause, Rúhíyyih Khanum representing the Universal House of Justice. In 2004 members of the Baháʼí community in Georgia opened the first Degree Confluence point in Georgia. Addressing circumstances in Georgia, Baháʼís have observed that publishing their materials is "not very easy", and "Some companies are not happy to print our material – they have only limited understanding. Plus they are afraid that if the government finds out they might have problems." There is a project to revise school curricula to represent the diverse religions in Georgia on a more neutral basis than done in recent years. Not all schools introduced revised religious education classes - "about half the schools in Tbilisi have these classes". The Baháʼí Faith is among the religions with a small following who function unobtrusively and have mainly tended to be able to operate without much hostile government attention.

Some 47 Georgian Baháʼís traveled to Baku to be among the 360 participants in a regional conference of the religion in 2009.

=== Demographics ===
The religion is noted as growing in Georgia. The Association of Religion Data Archives (relying on World Christian Encyclopedia) estimated some 1,588 Baháʼís in 2005.

== See also ==
- Religion in Georgia (country)
- History of Georgia (country)
- Baháʼí Faith in Azerbaijan
- Baháʼí Faith in Turkmenistan
