= Bahiyyih Nakhjavani =

Iranian writer

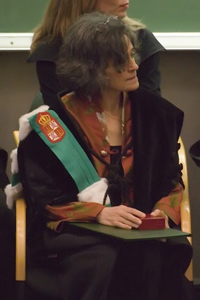
Bahiyyih Nakhjavani, 2007 ceremony for honorary doctorate at University of Liège

Bahiyyih Nakhjavani is an Iranian writer who grew up in Uganda in the 1960s. She was educated at Dr Williams School, Dolgellau, United Kingdom and the United States. She taught European and American literature in Belgium, and later moved to France, where she teaches.

In 2007, Bahiyyih Nakhjavani received the honorary doctorate Doctorats Honoris Causa from the University of Liège. Her books have been translated into many languages.

== Life ==
Bahiyyih Nakhjavani was born in Iran, grew up in Uganda, and received education in Britain. She earned a PhD in late-16th century poetry at the University of Massachusetts at Amherst in 1978.

== Family ==
Although originally from Nakhchivan, her father Ali Nakhjavani was born in 1919 in Baku, the capital of the Azerbaijan Democratic Republic. Ali Nakhchivani, whose mother was Palestinian, moved to Palestine after the death of his father, and after growing up there, he went to Uganda in 1951 to spread the Bahá'í Faith. Ali Nakhjavani's father, Ali Akbar Nakhcivani, was from Ordubad, Nakhchivan district of Azerbaijan.

== Novels ==
Her first novel, The Saddlebag - A Fable for Doubters and Seekers was an international bestseller. It describes events set in the Najd plateau along the pilgrim route between Mecca and Medina during one day in 1844–1845, when a mysterious saddlebag passes from hand to hand, and influences the lives of each person who comes across it. Inspired by Chapter VII of The Dawn-Breakers by Nabíl-i-Aʻzam, where the Bab - the forerunner to Baha'u'llah, the Founder of the Baháʼí Faith - has His saddlebag stolen while traveling to Mecca and Medina for pilgrimage. The main characters are the Thief, the Bride, the Chieftain, the Moneychanger, the Slave, the Pilgrim, the Priest, the Dervish and the Corpse.

The novel Paper - The Dreams of A Scribe is an allegory centered on a Scribe who is searching for the perfect paper for writing his masterpiece. It is set in Máh-Kú, a border town in the north-west Persia, between the Summer of 1847 and the Spring of 1848. It contains 19 chapters which are structured symmetrically around five dreams. Other main characters are the Mullah, the Widow, the Warden, his Mother and Daughter, and the Prisoner.

Her third novel The Woman Who Read Too Much is also set in the middle of the nineteenth century and centers around Tahirih Qurratu'l-Ayn, a poet and scholar from Qazvin, who shocked the political powers of Qajar Persia and violated religious convention by casting aside her veil. This protagonist is a heroine from early Baháʼí/Babi history and was one of the Bab's early followers who were known as the Letters of the Living. This novel is divided into four parts with revolving points of view of mother, sister, daughter, and wife, respectively. It traces the capture, incarceration, torture and final execution of the central figure of the mysterious poet while exploring her impact on the mayor, minister, mullah and monarch in a world of intrigue and corruption in Qajar Persia. The book has been translated into French, Italian in 2007 and will be out in Korean and Spanish by 2008/9; it was nominated for the 2008 Latifeh Yarshater Award, and has been published in English by Stanford University Press in 2015.

== Bibliography ==
=== Novels ===
- Bahiyyih Nakhjavani (2000). The Saddlebag - A Fable for Doubters and Seekers. London, UK: Bloomsbury Publishing Plc. ISBN 0-8070-8342-9.
- Bahiyyih Nakhjavani (2004). Paper - The Dreams of A Scribe. London, UK: Bloomsbury Publishing Plc. ISBN 0-7475-6921-5.
- Bahiyyih Nakhjavani (2015). The Woman Who Read Too Much: A Novel. Stanford, CA: Stanford University Press. ISBN 9780804794299.
- Bahiyyih Nakhjavani (2017). Us & Them. Stanford, CA: Redwood Press. ISBN 9781503601581.

=== Other books ===
- Bahiyyih Nakhjavani (1979). When We Grow Up. Oxford, UK: George Ronald. ISBN 0-85398-086-1.
- Bahiyyih Nakhjavani (1981). Response. Oxford, UK: George Ronald. ISBN 0-85398-107-8.
- Bahiyyih Nakhjavani (1983). Four on an Island. Oxford, UK: George Ronald. ISBN 0-85398-174-4.
- Bahiyyih Nakhjavani (1990). Asking Questions: A Challenge to Fundamentalism. Oxford, UK: George Ronald. ISBN 0-85398-314-3.
- Augusto López-Claros and Bahiyyih Nakhjavani (2018). Equality for Women = Prosperity for All: The Disastrous Global Crisis of Gender Inequality. New York, NY: St. Martin's Press. ISBN 9781250051189.

== Further reading/viewing ==
- Bahiyyih Nakhjavani (April 25, 2017). Us & Them: Breaking Free from Cultural Branding & Identity Politics (video). Washington, DC: Library of Congress.
- Bahiyyih Nakhjavani (April 2, 2015). The Woman Who Read Too Much (video). Washington, DC: Library of Congress.
- Manguel, Alberto (16 May 2015). "The Woman Who Read Too Much by Bahiyyih Nakhjavani review – a haunting, complex portrait". The Guardian. New York, NY.
- "Lecture at UCLA: Novels and Iranian History: Beyond Diaspora". Los Angeles, CA: Center for Near Eastern Studies, UCLA. Apr 12, 2008. Archived from the original on January 15, 2020.
- "Association for Baha'i Studies (English-speaking Europe) International Conference on Fundamentalism" (PDF). Center for Shaykhī and Bābī-Bahā’ī Studies, University of California, Merced. London, UK: The Institute of Commonwealth Studies, University of London. 9 June 2002.

== See also ==
- Baháʼí Faith in fiction
- Declaration of Independence (Azerbaijan), Contemporary history of Azerbaijan, Greater Iran
