= Baháʼí Faith in Azerbaijan =

The history of the Baháʼí Faith in Azerbaijan is complex and intertwined with various developments in the country's history. Through that series of changes the thread of the Baháʼí Faith traces its history in the region from the earliest moments of the Bábí religion, accepted by Baháʼís as a predecessor religion. Followers of the religion formed communities in Nakhichevan before 1850. By the early 20th century the community, by then centered in Baku, numbered perhaps 2000 individuals and several Baháʼí Local Spiritual Assemblies and had facilitated the favorable attention of local and regional, and international leaders of thought as well as long-standing leading figures in the religion. However under Soviet rule the Baháʼí community was almost ended though it was quickly reactivated as more than 30 years later when perestroyka loosened controls on religions. The community quickly rallied and re-elected its own National Spiritual Assembly in 1992. The modern Baháʼí population of Azerbaijan, centered in Baku, may have regained its peak from the oppression of the Soviet period of about 2000 people, today with more than 80% converts, although the community in Nakhichevan, where it all began, is still seriously harassed and oppressed. The Association of Religion Data Archives (relying on World Christian Encyclopedia) estimated some 1,685 Baháʼís in 2010.

== Beginnings ==
Geopolitical map

The history of the religion in Azerbaijan commenced when the area was under the rule of the Russian Empire. During the regional independence movements during the Russian Civil War, continuing Prometheism efforts and more recently since the Dissolution of the USSR, there were also developments and changes.

=== Earliest phase ===
A group of members of the Bábí religion formed in Nakhichevan and spread before 1850 largely of Persian expatriates who were fleeing persecution in Persia. The Russian army, under the command of General Vasili Bebutov, attacked the new community which formed so quickly and is thought to have included more than ten thousand people.

=== Growth during the Bábí and early Baháʼí periods ===
From 1850 on small communities established themselves in Ordubad, Baku, Balakhani, Ganja, Barda, Goychay, Salyan, Khilli (present Neftchala), Shaki, Shamakhy. Soon the community of Baku counted the largest number of believers in the region and in 1860 obtained official recognition from the authorities. The community recognized the newly announced position of Baháʼu'lláh. Soon there was more public awareness and some favor from leaders of the broader community and at the same time the Baháʼí community of Baku broadened its communication with other Baháʼí communities in Russia, Turkey and Ashkhabad and did much work printing materials in Turkish. Musa Naghiyev (1849–1919), one of Azerbaijan's richest citizens at the time, is considered to have been a Baháʼí by some modern sources, while others state that he was a Muslim. He donated to Islamic charities and received an Islamic burial, (Note: Naghiyev also had hoped to be buried in the Shia Muslim holy city of Karbala, though he was not.) but he participated as a member of the Baháʼí Spiritual Assembly of Baku. There were also many public figures before and after who seem to have admired the religion or even been members of it.

=== Maximum extent of the early community ===
Circa 1902 relations with the government were good but with the general population "…we have no satisfactory tranquility on account of the people." and the Baku assembly was now also in contact with Baháʼí communities in the United States. Baháʼí Local Spiritual Assemblies were elected in Balakhani, Baku, Ganja, Barda, and Salyan. Charles Mason Remey traveled there in 1908 and describes the community briefly. The community may have peaked at about 2000 people, second only to that of Ashqabad - see Baháʼí Faith in Turkmenistan. The Nakhjavani family played many and major roles in the Baháʼí Faith before and in the coming decades.

The father of the family, Mirza ʻAli-Akbar Nakhjavani, translated communications to and from Leo Tolstoy c. 1890s and assisted ʻAbdu'l-Bahá in his travels to the United States in 1911–12. The children of Ali-Akbar included Jalal, born in 1917, and Ali in 1919. After his death c. 1920–1, the family was invited to take up residence in Haifa and Ali-Akbar's wife and sister worked as attendants in the house of ʻAbdu'l-Bahá after his death, assisting the many pilgrims who came there. Both children grew up eventually attending Beirut University and moved to a variety of places to help spread the religion. Both initially moved back to Iran and then Africa. Jalal went to Dar-es-Salaam, Tanzania and then years later in Hamburg West Germany and helping to found the assembly of Neumuenster and then finally in Selkirk Canada where he soon died, though he traveled and spoke to groups until his last days. Ali helped spread of the religion across from Uganda through central Africa to Cameroon and in 1963 would be elected to the Universal House of Justice and was re-elected and served 40 years before retiring.

=== First oppression ===
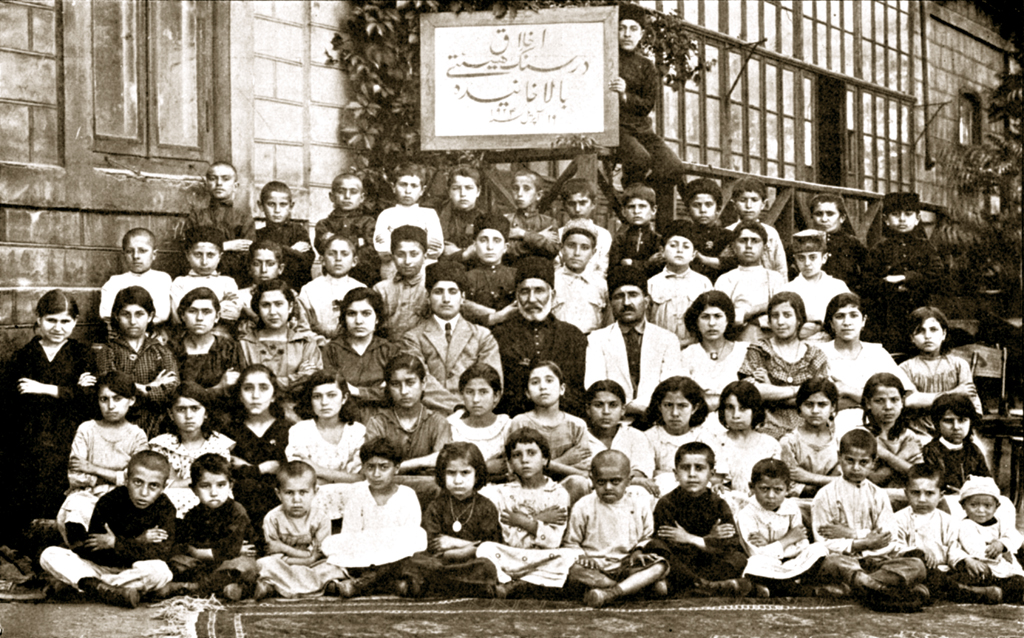
A Baha'i "character building" class in Baku, 1926 shows a group of Baha'i children receiving instructions in the principles of character training.

From 1922 Soviet officials launched their initial campaigns against the Baháʼís including deportation of Baháʼí Iranian citizens to Iran and the exile of others to Siberia, publications and schools were banned, as well as collective meetings. Regardless, a new wave of national organization was achieved with the election of the regional National Assembly of the Baháʼís of the Caucasus and Turkistan in 1925. However, in 1928 orders were dispersed among the Baháʼí communities suspending all meetings, and suppressing all local and national administration. Prohibitions were placed on the raising of funds, and Baháʼí youth and children's clubs were ordered closed. By about 1937 only the assembly of Baku and Ashgabat were still functioning though the membership of the Baku assembly had been elected three times in two years because the first two set of members were arrested en masse and exiled to Siberia. The third set was mostly women. In 1937, with the NKVD (Soviet secret police) and the policy of religious oppression the Soviets began a sweep against the Baháʼís on October 13 and in a few days all the members of the spiritual assembly of Baku and dozens of others were arrested. The chairman was executed. It wasn't until 1956 when the Spiritual Assembly of Baku started to function again after a fashion but by the end of 1963 was ranked as only a community, not an assembly. The regional National Assembly of the Caucasus and Turkistan was disbanded.

=== Second oppression ===
In November 1982 there were systematic sweeping arrests by the KGB including of S.D. Asadova, I.F. Gasimov, and I.G. Ayyubov who were interrogated for 7 hours continuously and had to write 10-page explanations. They were prohibited from telling anybody about their arrest and meetings of the community were ended.

== From Perestroyka ==
By 1987, Baháʼís had almost disappeared in the Soviet Union. As Perestroyka approached, the Baháʼís began to organize and get in contact with each other. From 1988 the Baháʼís in Moscow and Ashqabad and then in Baku became active (see also Baháʼí Faith in Ukraine.) With more than 20 Baháʼís in Baku at that time only three went to the State Department of Religion of Azerbaijan, for fear of arrests, in order to announce their intention to re-establish the Spiritual Assembly of the Baháʼís of Baku. By the end of 1990, after 50 almost years, the election for the Spiritual Assembly of the Baháʼís of Baku was held, followed by Gandja and Barda. In 1991 the Spiritual Assemblies were re-elected in Salyan and Balakhani. In 1992 the Parliament of Azerbaijan adopted the law of religious liberty and Baháʼís gained an opportunity to officially register communities and the National Spiritual Assembly of the Baháʼís of Azerbaijan was elected, which had been effectively disbanded since 1938. In 1993 the Governing Board of the Ministry of Justice of the Azerbaijan Republic gave official permission for the functioning of the Baháʼí Community of Baku.

The Baháʼís of Baku are seeking the return of property confiscated during the Soviet era—especially a house that served as the Baháʼí Center. The Baháʼí population of Azerbaijan, centered in Baku, may have regained its peak from the oppression of the Soviet period of about 2,000 people, with more than 80% converts. In 2005 the Association of Religion Data Archives (relying in part on the World Christian Encyclopedia) estimated somewhat fewer Baháʼís at about 1,500. Influence from Turk, rather than Russian or Iranian, Baháʼís seems to be playing a leading role among conversions of Azerbaijanis. However, the small Baháʼí Nakhichevan community is harassed by the authorities and they lack freedom of association. A leading Baháʼí was arrested in 2004. Officials claimed he was not imprisoned for his religious beliefs though officials extracted a verbal promise from him not to speak further of his religion to anyone.

The Association of Religion Data Archives (relying on World Christian Encyclopedia) estimated some 1,685 Baháʼís in 2010.

== See also ==
- Baháʼí Faith by country
- Religion in Azerbaijan
- History of Azerbaijan
- Baháʼí Faith in Georgia
- Baháʼí Faith in Turkmenistan
- Baháʼí Faith in Ukraine
- Persecution of Baháʼís
