= Marie von Najmajer =

Austrian novelist and poet

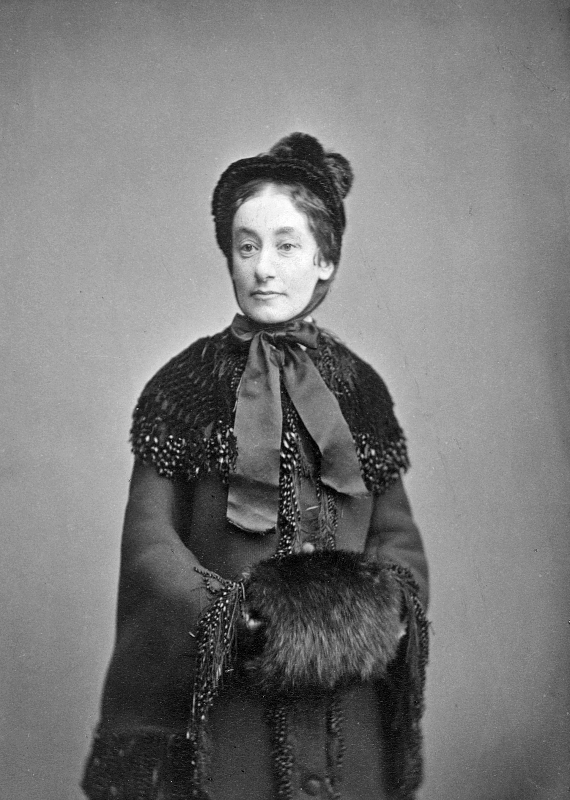
Marie von Najmájer

Marie von Najmájer (3 February 1844 in Buda, Hungary – 25 July 1904 in Bad Aussee (Styria), Austria) was an Austrian novelist and poet. She was the daughter of Hungarian royal hofrat Franz von Najmájer. In 1852 she moved to Vienna with her mother. She was an activist of the Association for Women's Education in Vienna (Verein für erweiterte Frauenbildung in Wien). She wrote lyric poetry, much of which about women's love of women, for example a long narrative poem dedicated to Queen Christian of Sweden and her love of Ebba. In 1875, when she was around 30, she became friends with Marie von Ebner-Eschenbach, and until her death -- the two regularly wrote letters to each other. Their correspondence can be seen as a very close friendship, but the Najamer's extensive writing of lesbianism lends credence to the idea that her love for Ebner was something more than platonic.

== Works ==
- Schneeglöckchen. Gedichte. (A snowdrop. Poems), Wien 1868
- Gedichte. Neue Folge (Poems), Wien 1872
- Gurret-ül-Eyn. (A picture from the Persian modern times in 6 Songs about Baháʼí religious movement), Wien 1874
- Gräfin Ebba. Ein Gedicht (Countess Ebba. A poem), Stuttgart 1877
- Eine Schwedenkönigin (Queen of Sweden. A novel), Breslau 1882
- Johannisfeuer. Eine Dichtung (Midsummer. A poem, Stuttgart 1888
- Neue Gedichte (New poems), Stuttgart 1891
- Der Stern von Navarra. Historischer Roman (The star of Navarra. A historical novel), Berlin 1900.
- Der Göttin Eigenthum (Goddess's possession), Wien 1901
- Kaiser Julian. Trauerspiel in 5 Akten (Emperor Julian. A tragedy), Wien 1904
- Hildegund. Ännchen von Tharau. Der Goldschuh. Dramat. Nachlaß (theatrical legacy), Wien 1907
