= Romain Rolland =

French author (1866–1944)

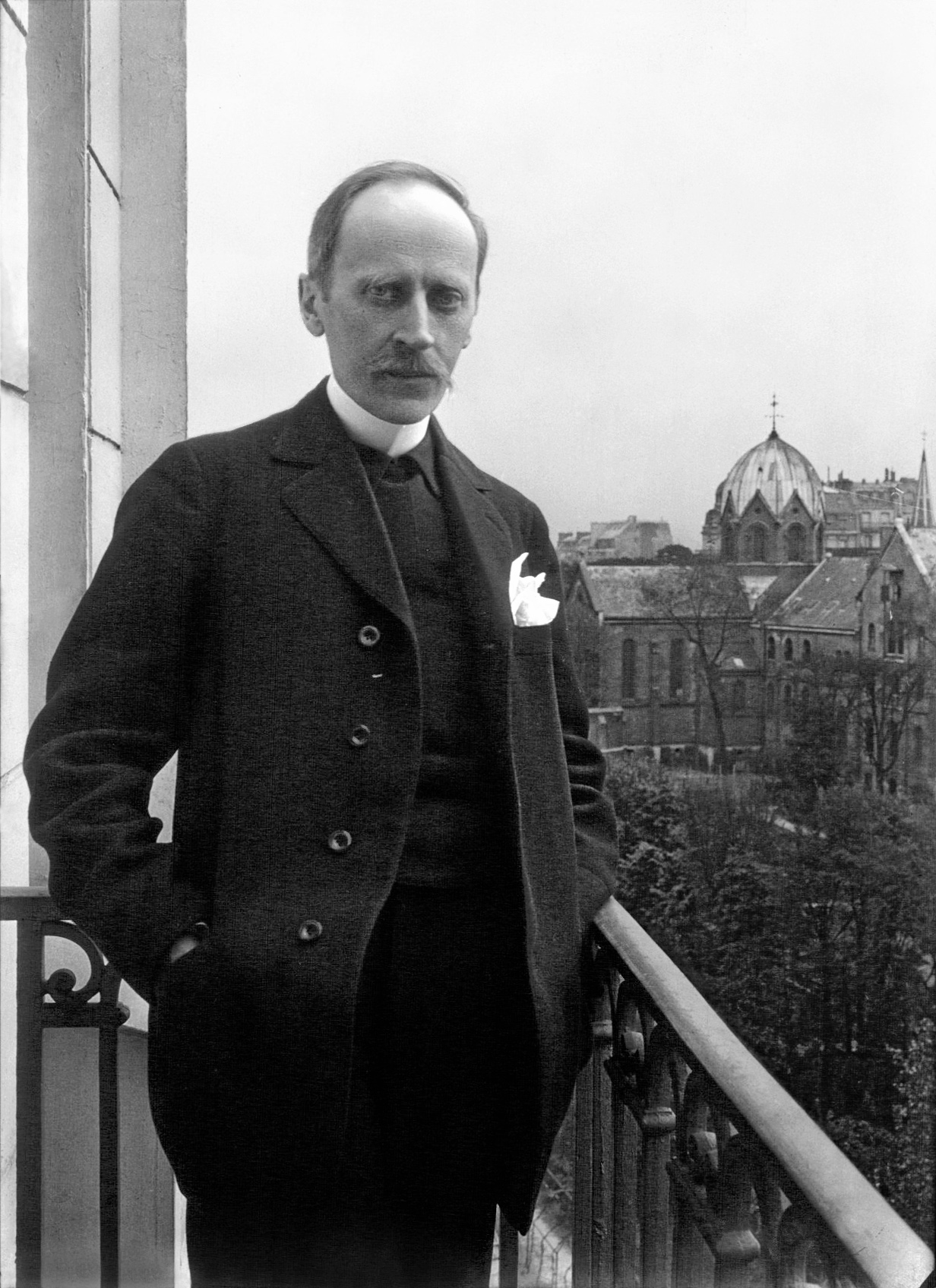
- Romain Rolland, 1914
- Born: 29 January 1866; Clamecy, France
- Died: 30 December 1944 (aged 78); Vézelay, France
- Occupations: Dramatist; essayist; art historian; novelist; musicologist
- Spouse(s): Clothilde Bréal, m. 1892–1901; Marie Romain Rolland, m. 1934–1944
- Relatives: Madeleine Rolland (sister)
- Writing career
- Period: 1902–1944
- Notable awards: Nobel Prize in Literature; 1915

Romain Rolland (French: [ʁɔmɛ̃ ʁɔlɑ̃]; 29 January 1866 – 30 December 1944) was a French dramatist, novelist, essayist, art historian and mystic who was awarded the Nobel Prize for Literature in 1915 "as a tribute to the lofty idealism of his literary production and to the sympathy and love of truth with which he has described different types of human beings".

He was an admirer of Mahatma Gandhi, Rabindranath Tagore and Joseph Stalin, wrote a still relevant biography of Gandhi, and is also noted for his correspondence with numerous writers and thinkers across the globe including Tagore, Maxim Gorki and Sigmund Freud.

== Biography ==
Rolland was born in Clamecy, Nièvre into a family that had both wealthy townspeople and farmers in its lineage. Writing introspectively in his Voyage intérieur (1942), he sees himself as a representative of an "antique species". He would cast these ancestors in Colas Breugnon (1919).

Accepted to the École normale supérieure in 1886, he first studied philosophy, but his independence of spirit led him to abandon that so as not to submit to the dominant ideology. He received his degree in history in 1889 and spent two years in Rome, where his encounter with Malwida von Meysenbug–who had been a friend of Nietzsche and of Wagner–and his discovery of Italian masterpieces were decisive for the development of his thought. When he returned to France in 1895, he received his doctoral degree with his thesis Les origines du théâtre lyrique moderne. Histoire de l'opéra en Europe avant Lulli et Scarlatti (The origins of modern lyric theatre. A History of Opera in Europe before Lully and Scarlatti). For the next two decades, he taught at various lycées in Paris before directing the newly established music school of the École des Hautes Études Sociales from 1902 to 1911. In 1903 he was appointed to the first chair of music history at the Sorbonne, he also directed briefly in 1911 the musical section at the French Institute in Florence.

His first book was published in 1902 when he was 36 years old. Through his advocacy for a 'people's theatre', he made a significant contribution towards the democratisation of the theatre. As a humanist, he embraced the work of the Indian philosophers ("Conversations with Rabindranath Tagore" and Mohandas Gandhi). Rolland was strongly influenced by the Vedanta philosophy of India, primarily through the works of Swami Vivekananda.

A demanding, yet timid, young man, he did not like teaching. He was not indifferent to youth: Jean-Christophe, Olivier and their friends, the heroes of his novels, are young people. But with real-life persons, youths as well as adults, Rolland maintained only a distant relationship. He was first and foremost a writer. Assured that literature would provide him with a modest income, he resigned from the university in 1912. In 1920, Rolland used the phrase, "Pessimism of the intellect, optimism of the will" in a review, which Antonio Gramsci adopted from him as a formula for intellectual perseverance during hard times.

Romain Rolland was a lifelong pacifist. He was one of the few major French writers to retain his pacifist internationalist values; he moved to Switzerland. He protested against the first World War in Au-dessus de la mêlée (1915), Above the Battle (Chicago, 1916). In 1924, his book on Gandhi contributed to the Indian nonviolent leader's reputation and the two men met in 1931. Rolland was a vegetarian.

In May 1922 he attended the International Congress of Progressive Artists and signed the "Founding Proclamation of the Union of Progressive International Artists".

In 1928 Rolland and Hungarian scholar, philosopher and natural living experimenter Edmund Bordeaux Szekely founded the International Biogenic Society to promote and expand on their ideas of the integration of mind, body and spirit. In 1932 Rolland was among the first members of the World Committee Against War and Fascism, organized by Willi Münzenberg. Rolland criticized the control Münzenberg assumed over the committee and was against it being based in Berlin.

Rolland moved to Villeneuve, on the shores of Lake Geneva to devote himself to writing. His life was interrupted by health problems, and by travels to art exhibitions. His visit to Moscow (1935), on the invitation of Maxim Gorky, was an opportunity to meet Joseph Stalin, whom he considered the greatest man of his time. Rolland served unofficially as ambassador of French artists to the Soviet Union. Although he admired Stalin, he attempted to intervene against the persecution of his friends. He attempted to discuss his concerns with Stalin, and was involved in the campaign for the release of the Left Opposition activist and writer Victor Serge and wrote to Stalin begging clemency for Nikolai Bukharin. During Serge's imprisonment (1933–1936), Rolland had agreed to handle the publications of Serge's writings in France, despite their political disagreements.

In 1937, he came back to live in Vézelay, which, in 1940, was occupied by the Germans. During the occupation, he isolated himself in complete solitude. Never stopping his work, in 1940, he finished his memoirs. He also placed the finishing touches on his musical research on the life of Ludwig van Beethoven. Shortly before his death, he wrote Péguy (1944), in which he examines religion and socialism through the context of his memories. He died on 30 December 1944 in Vézelay.

In 1921, his close friend the Austrian writer Stefan Zweig published his biography (in English Romain Rolland: The Man and His Works). Zweig profoundly admired Rolland, whom he once described as "the moral consciousness of Europe" during the years of turmoil and War in Europe. Zweig wrote at length about his friendship with Rolland in his own autobiography (in English The World of Yesterday), discussing, for example, their failed efforts to organize a conference of antiwar intellectuals from both warring camps in neutral Switzerland.

Victor Serge was appreciative of Rolland's interventions on his behalf but ultimately thoroughly disappointed by Rolland's refusal to break publicly with Stalin and the repressive Soviet regime. The entry for 4 May 1945, a few weeks after Rolland's death, in Serge's Notebooks: 1936-1947 notes acidly that "At age seventy the author of Jean-Christophe allowed himself to be covered with the blood spilled by a tyranny of which he was a faithful adulator." However, this is completely denied by Romain Rolland's biographer Bernard Duchatelet in his French biography Romain Rolland: Tel qu'en lui-même. Duchatelet and other Rollandians believe that Rolland remained faithful to his own well-known integrity.

Rolland's life was 'the story of a conscience', as mentioned in the title of the book on him by Alex Aronson.

Hermann Hesse dedicated Siddhartha to Romain Rolland "my dear friend".

== People's theatre ==
Rolland's most significant contribution to the theatre lies in his advocacy for a "popular theatre" in his essay The People's Theatre (Le Théâtre du peuple, 1902). "There is only one necessary condition for the emergence of a new theatre", he wrote, "that the stage and auditorium should be open to the masses, should be able to contain a people and the actions of a people". The book was not published until 1913, but most of its contents had appeared in the Revue d'Art Dramatique between 1900 and 1903. Rolland attempted to put his theory into practice with his melodramatic dramas about the French Revolution, Danton (1900) and The Fourteenth of July (1902), but it was his ideas that formed a major reference point for subsequent practitioners.

"The people have been gradually conquered by the bourgeois class, penetrated by their thoughts and now want only to resemble them. If you long for a people's art, begin by creating a people!"
Romain Rolland, Le Théâtre du peuple (1903).

The essay is part of a more general movement around the turn of that century towards the democratization of the theatre. The Revue had held a competition and tried to organize a "World Congress on People's Theatre", and a number of People's Theatres had opened across Europe, including the Freie Volksbühne movement ('Free People's Theatre') in Germany and Maurice Pottecher's Théâtre du Peuple in France. Rolland was a disciple of Pottecher and dedicated The People's Theatre to him.

Rolland's approach is more aggressive, though, than Pottecher's poetic vision of theatre as a substitute 'social religion' bringing unity to the nation. Rolland indicts the bourgeoisie for its appropriation of the theatre, causing it to slide into decadence, and the deleterious effects of its ideological dominance. In proposing a suitable repertoire for his people's theatre, Rolland rejects classical drama in the belief that it is either too difficult or too static to be of interest to the masses. Drawing on the ideas of Jean-Jacques Rousseau, he proposes instead "an epic historical theatre of 'joy, force and intelligence' which will remind the people of its revolutionary heritage and revitalize the forces working for a new society" (in the words of Bradby and McCormick, quoting Rolland). Rolland believed that the people would be improved by seeing heroic images of their past. Rousseau's influence may be detected in Rolland's conception of theatre-as-festivity, an emphasis that reveals a fundamental anti-theatrical prejudice: "Theatre supposes lives that are poor and agitated, a people searching in dreams for a refuge from thought. If we were happier and freer we should not feel hungry for theatre. [...] A people that is happy and free has need of festivities more than of theatres; it will always see in itself the finest spectacle".

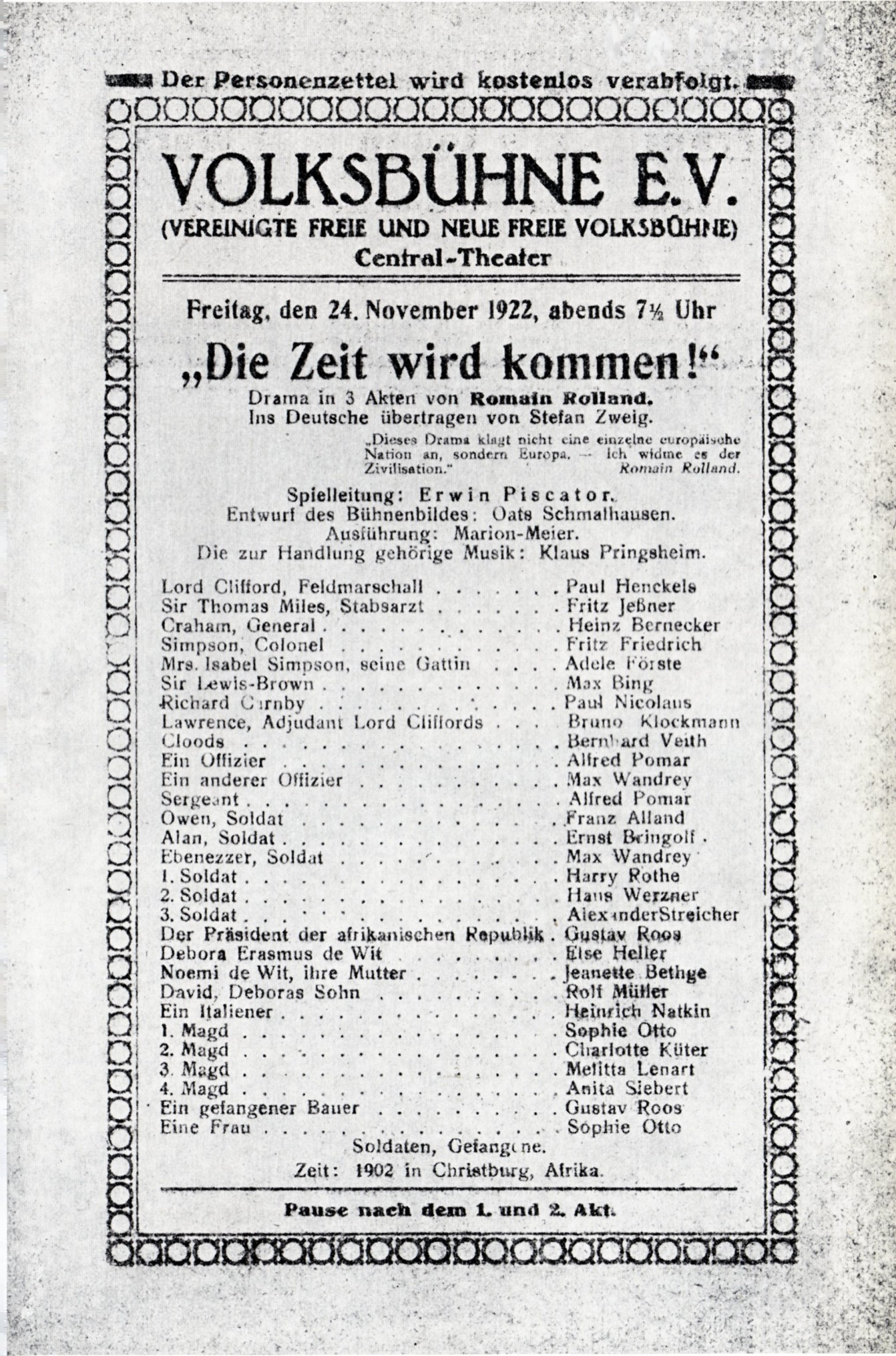
Programme sheet for Piscator's 1922 production of Rolland's drama The Time Will Come (1903), at the Central-Theater in Berlin.

Rolland's dramas have been staged by some of the most influential theatre directors of the twentieth century, including Max Reinhardt and Erwin Piscator. Piscator directed the world première of Rolland's pacifist drama The Time Will Come (Le Temps viendra, written in 1903) at Berlin's Central-Theater, which opened on 17 November 1922 with music by K Pringsheim and scenic design by O Schmalhausen and M Meier. The play addresses the connections between imperialism and capitalism, the treatment of enemy civilians, and the use of concentration camps, all of which are dramatised via an episode in the Boer War. Piscator described his treatment of the play as "thoroughly naturalistic", whereby he sought "to achieve the greatest possible realism in acting and decor". Despite the play's overly-rhetorical style, the production was reviewed positively.

== Novels ==
Rolland's most famous novel is the 10-volume novel sequence Jean-Christophe (1904–1912), which brings "together his interests and ideals in the story of a German musical genius who makes France his second home and becomes a vehicle for Rolland's views on music, social matters and understanding between nations". His other novels are Colas Breugnon (1919), Clérambault (1920), Pierre et Luce (1920) and his second roman-fleuve, the 7-volume L'âme enchantée (1922–1933).

== Academic career ==
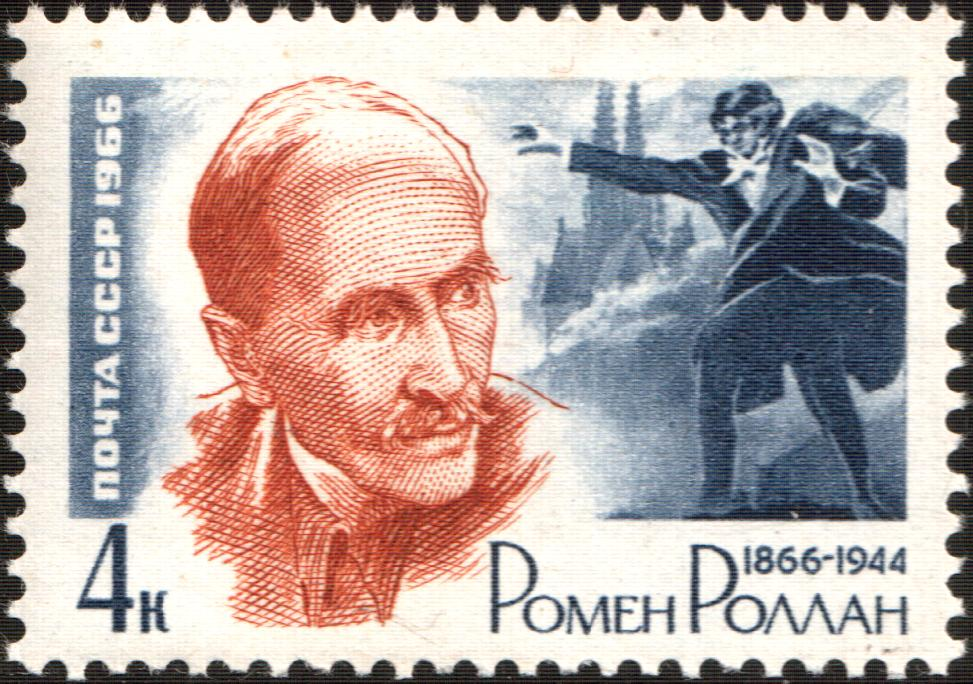
Stamp from the USSR which commemorates the 100th anniversary of Romain Rolland's birth in 1866.

He became a history teacher at Lycée Henri IV, then at the Lycée Louis le Grand, and a member of the École française de Rome, then a professor of the History of Music at the Sorbonne, and History Professor at the École Normale Supérieure.

== Correspondence with Richard Strauss ==
In 1899 Rolland started what became a voluminous correspondence with the German composer Richard Strauss (the English translation, by Rollo Myers, runs to 239 pages, including some diary entries). At the time, Strauss was a celebrated conductor of works by Wagner, Liszt, Mozart, and of his own tone poems. In 1905, Strauss completed his opera Salome, based on the verse play by Oscar Wilde, originally written in French. Strauss based his version of Salome on Hedwig Lachmann's German translation which he had seen performed in Berlin in 1902. Out of respect for Wilde, Strauss wanted to create a parallel French version, to be as close as possible to Wilde's original text, and he wrote to Rolland requesting his help on this project.

Rolland was initially reluctant, but a lengthy exchange ensued, occupying 50 pages of the Myers edition, and in the end Rolland made 191 suggestions for improving the Strauss/Wilde libretto. The resulting French version of Salome received its first performance in Paris in 1907, two years after the German premiere. Thereafter, Rolland's letters regularly discussed Strauss's operas, including the occasional criticism of Strauss's librettist, Hugo von Hofmannsthal: "I only regret that the great writer who gives you such brilliant libretti too often lacks a sense of the theatre."

Rolland was a pacifist and concurred with Strauss when the latter refused to sign the Manifesto of German artists and intellectuals supporting the German role in World War I. Rolland noted Strauss's response in his diary entry for October 1914: "Declarations about war and politics are not fitting for an artist, who must give his attention to his creations and his works."(Myers p. 160)

== Correspondence with Freud ==
1923 saw the beginning of a correspondence between psychoanalyst Sigmund Freud and Rolland, who found that the admiration that he showed for Freud was reciprocated in equal measures (Freud proclaiming in a letter to him: "That I have been allowed to exchange a greeting with you will remain a happy memory to the end of my days."). This correspondence introduced Freud to the concept of the "oceanic feeling" that Rolland had developed through his study of Eastern mysticism. Freud opened his next book Civilization and its Discontents (1929) with a debate on the nature of this feeling, which he mentioned had been noted to him by an anonymous "friend". This friend was Rolland. Rolland would remain a major influence on Freud's work, continuing their correspondence right up to Freud's death in 1939.

== Bibliography ==
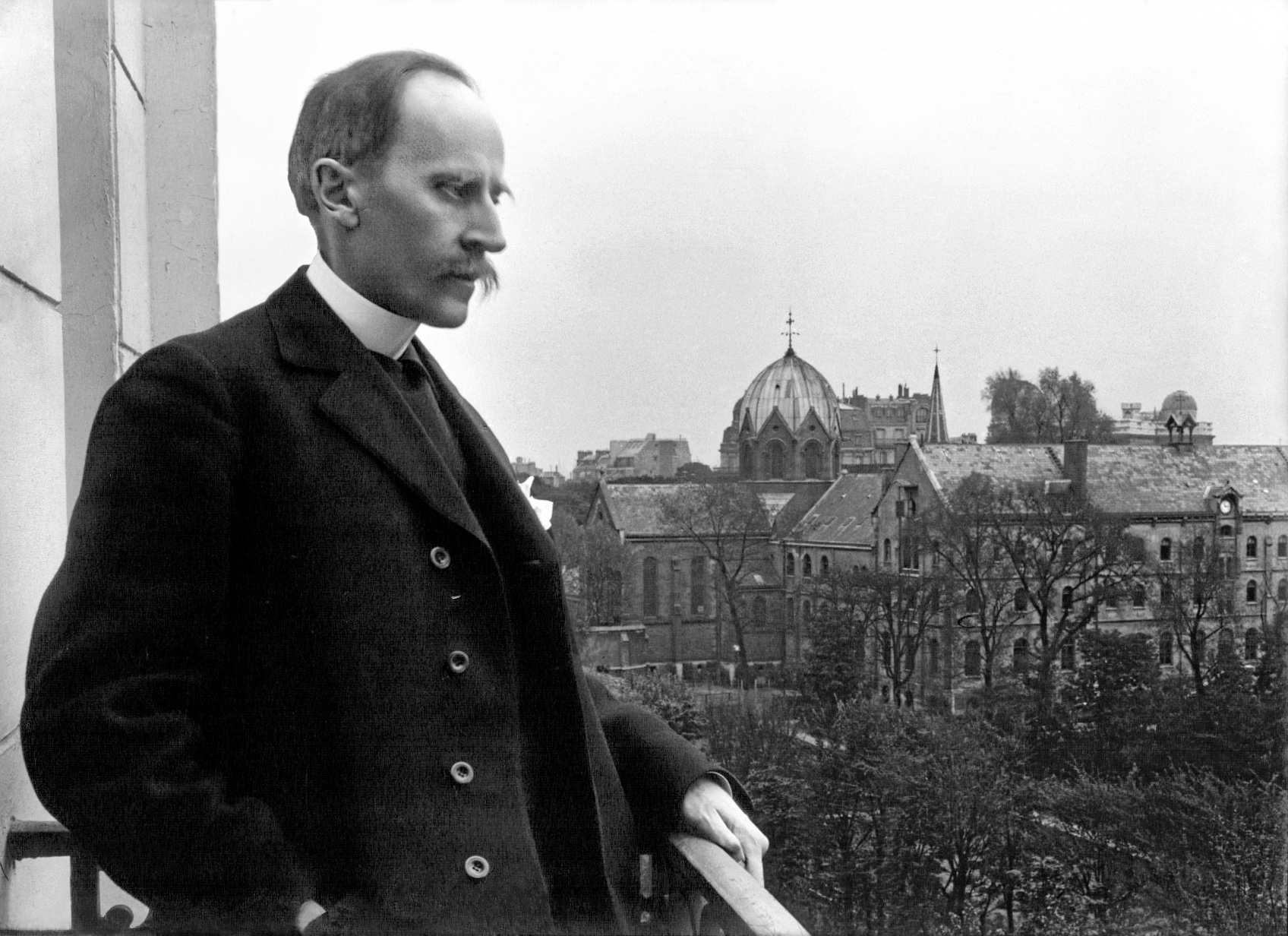
Romain Rolland in 1914, on the balcony of his home

| Year | Work | Notes |
|---|---|---|
| 1888 | Amour d'enfants | |
| 1891 | Les Baglioni | Unpublished during his lifetime. |
| 1891 | Empédocle (Empedocles) | Unpublished during his lifetime. |
| 1891 | Orsino (play) | Unpublished during his lifetime. |
| 1892 | Le Dernier Procès de Louis Berquin (The Last Trial of Louis Berquin) | book on the trial of Protestant reformer Louis de Berquin |
| 1895 | Les Origines du théâtre lyrique moderne (The origins of modern lyric theatre) | Academic treatise, which won a prize from the Académie Française |
| 1895 | Histoire de l'opéra avant Lully et Scarlatti (A History of Opera in Europe before Lully and Scarlatti) | Dissertation for his doctorate in Letters |
| 1895 | Cur ars picturae apud Italos XVI saeculi deciderit | Latin-language thesis on the decline in Italian oil painting in the course of the sixteenth century |
| 1897 | Saint-Louis | |
| 1897 | Aërt | Historical/philosophical drama |
| 1898 | Les Loups (The Wolves) | Historical/philosophical drama about the Dreyfuss affair. Co-written with Maurice Schwartz, and translated by Barrett H. Clark, the play ran for 29 performances in New York in 1932. |
| 1899 | Le Triomphe de la raison (The Triumph of Reason) | Historical/philosophical drama |
| 1899 | Georges Danton | Historical/philosophical drama |
| 1900 | Le Poison idéaliste | |
| 1901 | Les Fêtes de Beethoven à Mayence (The Celebrations of Beethoven in Mainz) | |
| 1902 | Le Quatorze Juillet (14 July–Bastille Day) | Historical/philosophical drama |
| 1902 | François-Millet | |
| 1903 | Vie de Beethoven (Life of Beethoven) | Novella |
| 1903 | Le temps viendra (The Time Will Come) | Drama |
| 1903 | Le Théâtre du peuple (The People's Theatre) | Seminal essay in the democratization of theatre. |
| 1904 | La Montespan | Historical/philosophical drama |
| 1904–1912 | Jean-Christophe | Cycle of ten volumes divided into three series–Jean-Christophe, Jean-Christophe à Paris, and la Fin du voyage, published by Cahiers de la Quinzaine and reprinted by Paul Ollendorff and Albin Michel |
| 1904 | L'Aube | First volume of the series Jean-Christophe |
| 1904 | Le Matin (Morning) | Second volume of the series Jean-Christophe |
| 1904 | L'Adolescent (The Adolescent) | Third volume of the series Jean-Christophe |
| 1905 | La Révolte (The Revolt) | Fourth volume of the series Jean-Christophe |
| 1907 | Vie de Michel-Ange (Life of Michelangelo) | Biography |
| 1908 | Musiciens d'aujourd'hui (Contemporary Musicians) | Collection of articles and essays about music |
| 1908 | Musiciens d'autrefois (Musicians of the Past) | Collection of articles and essays about music |
| 1908 | La Foire sur la place | First volume of the series Jean-Christophe à Paris |
| 1908 | Antoinette | Second volume of the series Jean-Christophe à Paris |
| 1908 | Dans la maison (At Home) | Third volume of the series Jean-Christophe à Paris |
| 1910 | Haendel (Handel) | Biography |
| 1910 | Les Amies (Friends) | First volume of the series la Fin du voyage |
| 1911 | La Vie de Tolstoï (Life of Tolstoy) | Biography |
| 1911 | Le Buisson ardent | Second volume of the series la Fin du voyage |
| 1912 | La Nouvelle Journée | Third volume of the series la Fin du voyage |
| 1911 | Jean-Christophe: Dawn . Morning . Youth . Revolt | In English, first four volumes published in one. Henry Holt and Company. Translated by Gilbert Cannan |
| 1911 | Jean-Christophe in Paris: The Market Place . Antoinette . The House | In English, second three volumes published in one. Henry Holt and Company. Translated by Gilbert Cannan |
| 1915 | Jean-Christophe: Journey's End: Love and Friendship . The Burning Bush . The New Dawn | In English, final three volumes published in one. Henry Holt and Company. Translated by Gilbert Cannan |
| 1912 | L'Humble Vie héroïque (The Humble Life of the Hero) | |
| 1915 | Au-dessus de la mêlée (Above the Battle) | Pacifist manifesto |
| 1915 | — | Received the Nobel Prize in Literature |
| 1917 | Salut à la révolution russe (Salute to the Russian Revolution) | |
| 1918 | Pour l'internationale de l'Esprit (For the International of the Spirit) | |
| 1918 | L'Âge de la haine (The Age of Hatred) | |
| 1919 | Colas Breugnon | Burgundian story, and basis for Colas Breugnon, the opera by Dmitry Kabalevsky |
| 1919 | Liluli | Play |
| 1919 | Les Précurseurs (The Forerunners) | |
| 1920 | Clérambault | Novel |
| 1920 | Pierre et Luce | Novel |
| 1921 | Pages choisies (Selected Pages) | |
| 1921 | La Révolte des machines (The Revolt of the Machines) | |
| 1922 | Annette et Sylvie | First volume of l'Âme enchantée |
| 1922 | Les Vaincus (The Vanquished) | |
| 1922–1933 | L'Âme enchantée (The Enchanted Soul) | Seven volumes |
| 1923 | — | Founded the review Europe |
| 1924 | L'Été (Summer) | Second volume of l'Âme enchantée |
| 1924 | Mahatma Gandhi | |
| 1924 | Le Jeu de l'amour et de la mort (The Game of Love and Death) | basis for Hra o láske a smrti, the opera by Ján Cikker |
| 1926 | Pâques fleuries | |
| 1927 | Mère et fils (Mother and Child) | Third volume of l'Âme enchantée |
| 1928 | Léonides | |
| 1928 | De l'Héroïque à l'Appassionata (From the Heroic to the Passionate) | |
| 1929 | Essai sur la mystique de l'action (A study of the Mystique of Action) | |
| 1929 | L'Inde vivante (Living India) | Essays |
| 1929 | Vie de Ramakrishna (Life of Ramakrishna) | Essays |
| 1930 | Vie de Vivekananda (Life of Vivekananda) | Essays |
| 1930 | L'Évangile universel | Essays |
| 1930 | Goethe et Beethoven (Goethe and Beethoven) | Essay |
| 1933 | L'Annonciatrice | Fourth volume of l'Âme enchantée |
| 1935 | Quinze ans de combat | |
| 1936 | Compagnons de route | |
| 1937 | Le Chant de la Résurrection (Song of the Resurrection) | |
| 1938 | Les Pages immortelles de Rousseau (The Immortal Pages of Rousseau) | |
| 1939 | Robespierre | Historical/philosophical drama |
| 1942 | Le Voyage intérieur (The Interior Voyage) | |
| 1943 | La Cathédrale interrompue (The Interrupted Cathedral) | Volumes I and II |
| 1945 | Péguy | Posthumous publication |
| 1945 | La Cathédrale interrompue | Volume III, posthumous |

== See also ==
- List of peace activists
