= Revue d'Histoire littéraire de la France =

Literary journal

The Revue d'Histoire littéraire de la France is a quarterly literary journal covering the study of French literature since the 15th century. The journal was established in 1894 and is published by the Société d’Histoire littéraire de la France. Its articles treat the history of French literature, biographies of authors, and the publication histories and reception of literary works. It publishes an annual bibliography of French literary scholarship in cooperation with the Bibliothèque nationale de France.
