= Constance Faunt Le Roy Runcie =

American classical composer

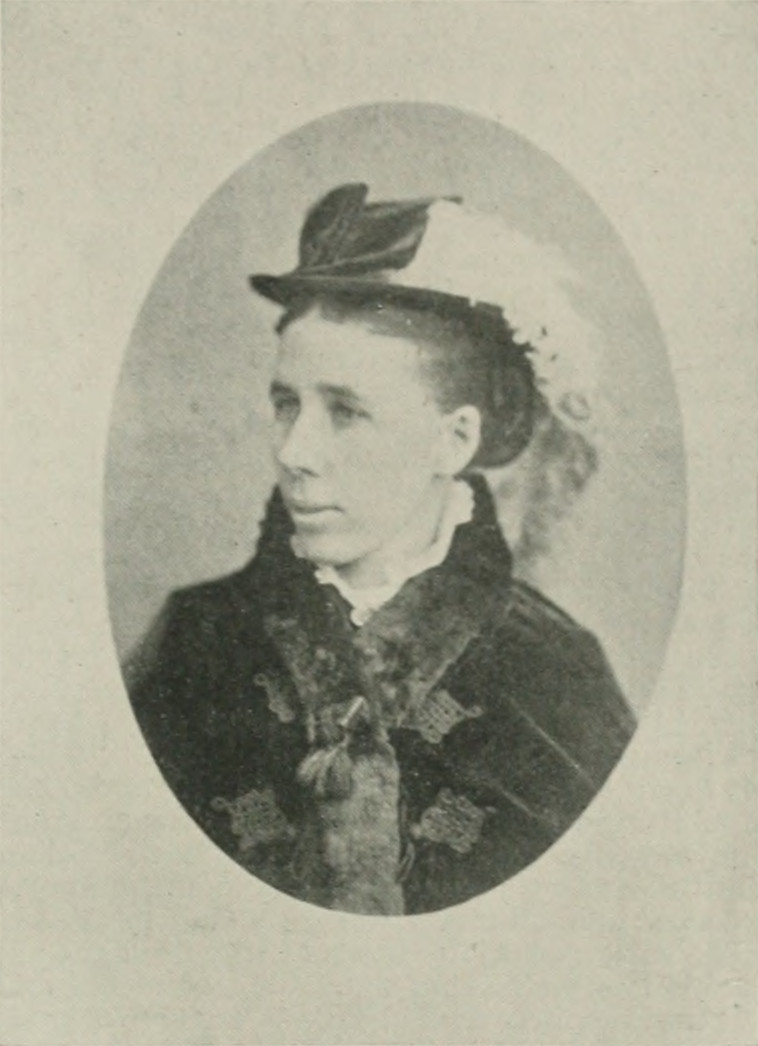
Constance Faunt Le Roy Runcie

Constance Faunt Le Roy Runcie (or Fauntleroy) (January 15, 1836 – May 17, 1911) was an American pianist, author and composer.

== Biography ==
She was born in Indianapolis, Indiana, the granddaughter of Welsh industrial reformer Robert Owen. After her father's death, she studied composition and piano in Germany from 1852 to 1861 and then returned to Indiana.

Faunt Le Roy married minister James Runcie and had four children. The couple lived in St. Joseph, Missouri, where Constance Runcie founded a woman's club to further cultural development of the area. Her daughter Ellinor Dale Runcie was also a writer. Her papers are housed at Missouri Western State University.

== Works ==
Constance Runcie is the author of works including short stories, plays and music compositions. Selected works include: Literary:

- The Burning Question non-fiction
- Divinely Led non-fiction
- Woman, an essay
- The Bab, a novel

She composed for orchestra, chamber ensemble and a number of songs. Selected works include:

- Hear Us, Oh, Hear Us
- Round the Throne
- Silence of the Sea
- Merry Life
- Tone Poems
- Take My Soul, Oh Lord
- I Never Told Him
- Dover of Peace
- I Hold My Heart So Still
- My Spirit Rests
