= Jean-Christophe =

Novel by Romain Rolland

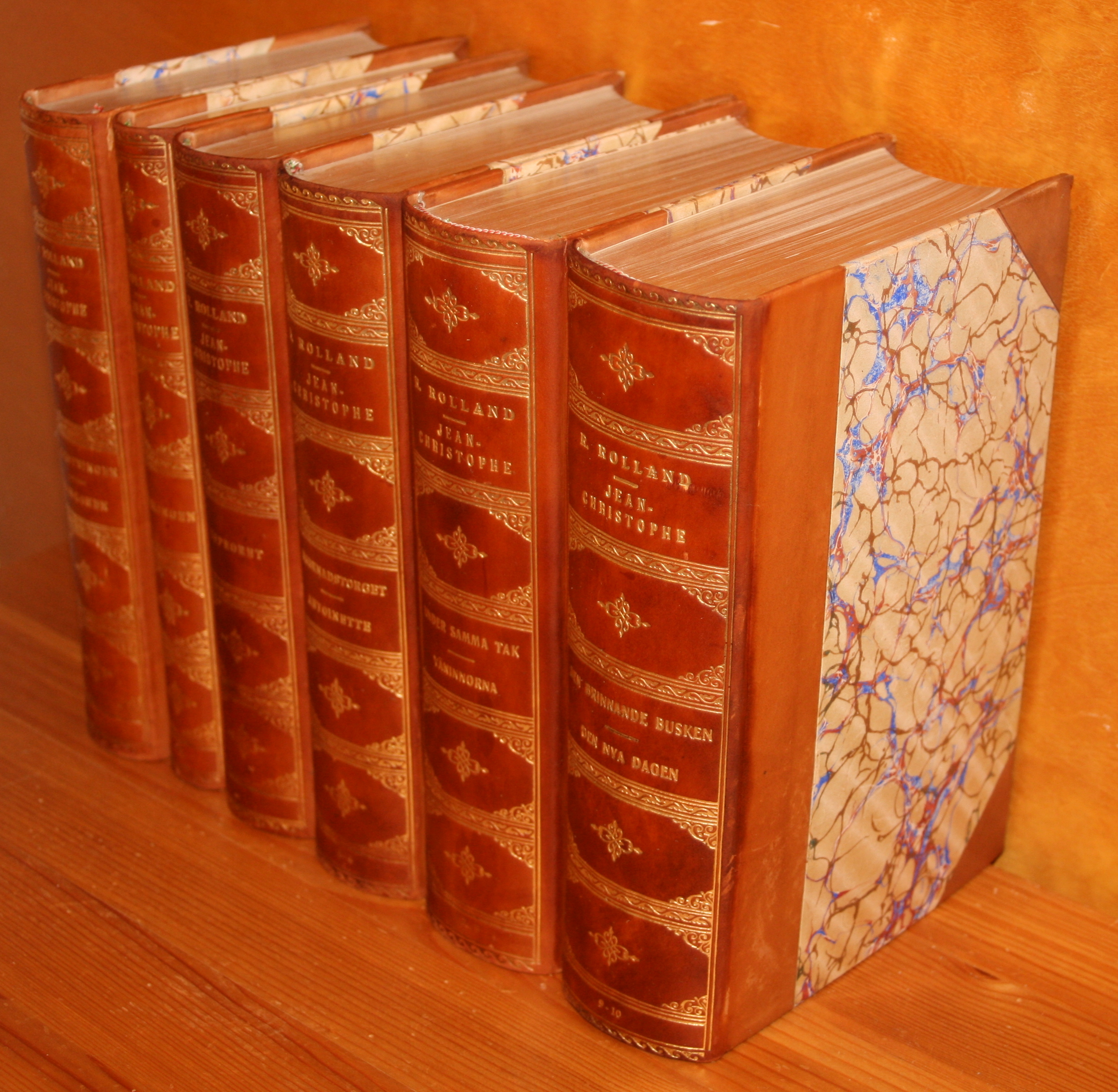
A Swedish translation of Jean-Christophe, 10 parts in 6 volumes

Jean-Christophe (1904‒1912) is the novel in 10 volumes by Romain Rolland for which he received the Prix Femina in 1905 and which contributed to his receiving the Nobel Prize for Literature in 1915. It was translated into English by Gilbert Cannan.

The sequence tells the story of a German musical genius living in France and incorporates views on music, society, and understanding between nations.

The first four volumes are sometimes grouped as Jean-Christophe, the next three as Jean-Christophe à Paris, and the last three as La fin du voyage ("Journey's End").

1. L'Aube ("Dawn", 1904)
2. Le Matin ("Morning", 1904)
3. L'Adolescent ("Youth", 1904)
4. La Révolte ("Revolt", 1905)
5. La Foire sur la place ("The Marketplace", 1908)
6. Antoinette (1908)
7. Dans la maison ("The House", 1908)
8. Les Amies ("Love and Friendship", 1910)
9. Le Buisson ardent ("The Burning Bush", 1911)
10. La Nouvelle Journée ("The New Dawn", 1912)

The English translations appeared between 1911 and 1913.

== Plot ==
The central character, Jean-Christophe Krafft, is a Frеnch musician of German extraction, a composer of genius whose life is depicted from cradle to grave. He undergoes great hardships and spiritual struggles, balancing his pride in his own talents with the necessity of earning a living and taking care of those around him. Tormented by injustices against his friends, forced to flee on several occasions as a result of his brushes with authority and his own conscience, he finally finds peace in a remote corner of Switzerland before returning in triumph to Paris a decade later.

== Criticism ==
Although Rolland first conceived the work in Rome in the spring of 1890, he began in earnest in 1903 after publishing a biography of Beethoven. A letter of 13 September 1902 reveals his plans:

My novel is the story of a life, from birth to death. My hero is a great German musician who is forced by circumstances to leave when he is 16-18 years old, living outside of Germany in Paris, Switzerland, etc. The setting is today's Europe [...] To spell it out, the hero is Beethoven in the modern world.

But in his preface to Dans la maison, published in 1909, Rolland denied that he was writing a novel in the traditional sense, but a "musical novel" in which emotions, not classical action, dictated the course of events. "When you see a man, do you ask yourself whether he is a novel or a poem? [...] Jean-Christophe has always seemed to me to flow like a river; I have said as much from the first pages." This coined the term roman-fleuve (river-novel), which has since been applied to other novel sequences in the same style.

Many individual tomes swerve from the story of Krafft to focus on the other characters. Rolland was an admirer of Leo Tolstoy, and, as in War and Peace, a very large proportion of the work is devoted to the author's thoughts on various subjects: music, art, literature, feminism, militarism, national character, and social changes in the Third Republic, largely attributed to Krafft, although Rolland denied that he shared many traits with his fictional composer. The didactic aspects of Jean-Christophe have been criticised by many readers. In his heavy use of matter-of-fact detail, Rolland followed the methods of naturalist predecessors with whom he otherwise had little in common.

== See also ==
- Bildungsroman
