= Clérambault (novel) =

Book by Romain Rolland

- Author: Romain Rolland
- Language: French
- Publication date: 1920
- Publication place: France

Clérambault (full title: Clérambault: The Story of an Independent Spirit During the War) is a 1920 novel by the Nobel Prize-winning French author Romain Rolland. It concerns a father's personal outcry against the militarism of the First World War, after his son dies in combat.
