= Baháʼí Faith in the Samoas =

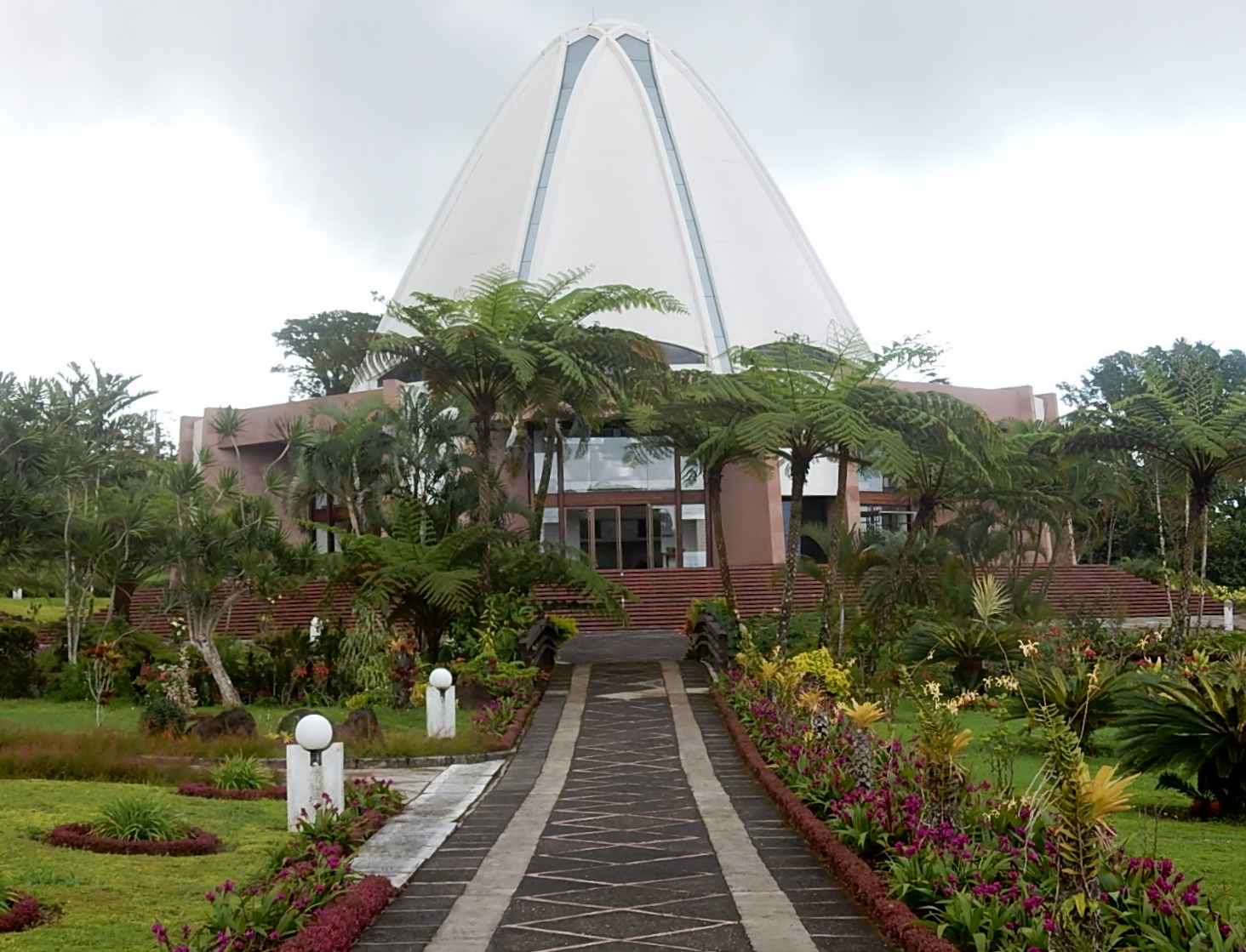
Baháʼí House of Worship in Apia, Samoa

The Baháʼí Faith in Samoa and American Samoa begins with the then head of the religion, ʻAbdu'l-Bahá, mentioning the islands in 1916. This inspired Baháʼís on their way to Australia in 1920 to stop in Samoa. Thirty four years later another Baháʼí from Australia pioneered to Samoa in 1954. With the first converts the first Baháʼí Local Spiritual Assembly was elected in 1961, and the Baháʼí National Spiritual Assembly was first elected in 1970. Following the conversion of Malietoa Tanumafili II, Samoa's then-head of state, the first Baháʼí House of Worship in the Pacific region was completed in 1984 and the Baháʼí community reached a population of over 3,000 by the year 2000.

== Early history ==
The first mention of the Samoan Islands in Baháʼí literature is in a series of letters, or tablets, to the followers of the religion in the United States in 1916–1917 by ʻAbdu'l–Bahá, head of the religion until 1921 when he died, asking the followers of the religion to travel to other countries; these letters were compiled together in the book titled Tablets of the Divine Plan. The seventh of the tablets was the first to mention several island nations in the Pacific Ocean. Written on 11 April 1916, it was delayed in being presented in the United States until 1919 – after the end of World War I and the Spanish flu. The seventh tablet was translated and presented by Mirza Ahmad Sohrab on 4 April 1919, and published in Star of the West magazine on 12 December 1919.

"A party speaking their languages, severed, holy, sanctified and filled with the love of God, must turn their faces to and travel through the three great island groups of the Pacific Ocean—Polynesia, Micronesia and Melanesia, and the islands attached to these groups, such as New Guinea, Borneo, Java, Sumatra, Philippine Islands, Solomon Islands, Fiji Islands, New Hebrides, Loyalty Islands, New Caledonia, Bismarck Archipelago, Ceram, Celebes, Friendly Islands, Samoa Islands, Society Islands, Caroline Islands, Low Archipelago, Marquesas, Hawaiian Islands, Gilbert Islands, Moluccas, Marshall Islands, Timor and the other islands. With hearts overflowing with the love of God, with tongues commemorating the mention of God, with eyes turned to the Kingdom of God, they must deliver the glad tidings of the manifestation of the Lord of Hosts to all the people."

Following this call to pioneer in 1919, Clara and Hyde Dunn moved from the United Kingdom to the United States where they met and married and then decided to pioneer to Australia in 1920 and stopped briefly in Samoa on their way. Shoghi Effendi, head of the religion after the death of ʻAbdu'l–Bahá, launched the Ten Year Crusade and during this plan, 34 years after the first Baháʼís of Australia had stopped at Samoa, a woman named Lilian Wyss, later Lilian Alá'í, pioneered to Western Samoa from Australia in January 1954 leaving behind a position on the National Spiritual Assembly of Australia at the age of 24 while her brother, Frank Wyss, introduced the religion that year to the Cocos Island. For their service, Shoghi Effendi awarded both of them the accolade of Knight of Baháʼu'lláh. Later she married and took the name Suhayl ʻAláʼí. About this time Emmanuel Rock, one of the earliest Samoans to join the religion, did so prior to the beginning of the Ten Year Crusade. Simple Baháʼí literature was translated into the Samoan language about 1955 and into the language of Niue Island in 1956. At this time Baháʼí sources claim there were five Baháʼís known among the Samoa Islands. The first native believer Mrs. Lotoa Rock, Emmanuel Rock's wife, joined the religion in 1956. In late 1956 Saialala Tamasese was the second native to join the religion and the first Baháʼí Local Spiritual Assembly was elected in 1957 in Western Samoa with another five smaller groups of Baháʼís, followed by an assembly election in Samoa in 1961. Many of the early Baháʼís were well educated and some had Christian theological training and after conversion sometimes held positions of high office in the religion.

== Developing community ==
=== Connections to and from the Baháʼís ===
From then events have multiplied involving the growing community. Starting on 29 October 1958 the first visit of a Hand of the Cause in the person of Enoch Olinga began an extended tour of the islands during which Olinga was honored with a Kava based ceremony. In 1959 the Baháʼís gathered in the first summer school with some 30 attendees and hosted by a local chief, purchased the first Baháʼí cemetery, and gathered with Samoans from both islands to consult on the growth of the religion on the islands. In 1962 the religion had reached the island of Savai'i and the first public talk on the religion was given in Apia – which was extended to three additional talks and Hand of the Cause Collis Featherstone visited Baháʼís and civic leaders. In 1963 the assembly of Pago Pago arranged the first observance of United Nations Day which had the acting governor and other leading figures giving talks. Coverage of the event was carried by print, radio and television media leading up to the event in general and of the Baháʼís hosting. In 1964 a conference on Fiji which included Baháʼís from Tonga, Samoa, New Guinea and Fiji. Immediately following the first convention was held to elect the regional national assembly of South Pacific Ocean. Baháʼís continued to come and began to leave from Samoa. Also in 1965 the first Samoan pioneer returned to the island of his birth – the Tokelau Islands. It was three years before authorities allowed him to promulgate his religion. Samoan Auxiliary Board member Niuoleava Tuataga toured Australia giving talks to Baháʼís and Australian society on the religion in 1967. Russell Garcia and Gina, his wife, visited many islands among Samoa in 1967 and others giving concerts and classes in schools for several years before ultimately moving to New Zealand. In 1969 Samoan Baháʼí women stretched social norms by personally taking trips to attempt to spread the religion. From December 1969 into January 1970 the first international youth conference of the south pacific took place in Apia drawing attendees from Samoa. Australia, Fiji, Hawaii, New Caledonia, New Zealand, Tonga, United States, and Western Samoa. Hand of the Cause Abu'l-Qásim Faizi attended and gave talks both to the attendees and to the public afterwards. In 1970 the National Spiritual Assembly of the Baháʼís of Samoa was elected at a convention hosting Hand of the Cause of God Collis Featherstone, Continental Board of Counsellors member Suhayl Ala'i, Auxiliary Board member Niuoleava Tuataga, the nine delegates and over fifty members of the religion from both Western and American Samoa. The elected members of the national assembly were from both Western and American Samoa.

=== Contact with civilian leaders ===
In an event that would have long range effects on the community in 1965 Tamasese, one of the first native Baháʼís of Samoa, died and at the funeral members of a royal family of Samoa were present at the Baháʼí funeral. According to tradition, a fine mat is presented to the presiding officer of the funeral which in this case was an Auxiliary Board member. This mat was presented to the Universal House of Justice in 1968. It was gifted to Malietoa Tanumafili II at the dedication of the temple in 1979. Meanwhile, cooperation with the government of Samoa expanded. In 1967 Baháʼís presented Baháʼí literature to the kings of Tonga and Samoa with more planned for leaders of government. In 1967 the government of Samoa sponsored the observance of United Nations Day. In years past it had been the Baha'i community of American Samoa that had sponsored the observance, with the aid of the government of American Samoa. This year Governor Aspinall appointed a United Nations Day Committee which included the chairman of the National Spiritual Assembly of the South Pacific Ocean, Suhayl Ala'i, as member of the Committee for Iran. Mr. Ala'i made suggestions resulting in the inclusion of the Baha'i prayer for unity in the program and the committee secured the services of Hand of the Cause Ugo Giachery as guest speaker.

By 1968, Malietoa Tanumafili II privately converted to the religion, which he publicly announced in 1973 when he wrote a letter to the convention to elect the Universal House of Justice. The Universal House of Justice asked Baháʼís individually to not seek publicity of the issue at the time. In 1974, Malietoa attended the national convention and congratulated work on construction of a Baháʼí center and KVZK-2 recorded a series of three 15-minute programs to be broadcast as part of its daily show Talosaga. In 1976 the national assembly was registered with the United States, the first Baháʼí center on Tutuila was raised, and Malietoa visited the grave of Shoghi Effendi. In 1986 as part of a series of events (see below) highlighting the importance of peace the Baháʼís had meetings with the American Samoan Speaker of the House and the prime minister of Western Samoa attended including a presentation of the statement by the Universal House of Justice called The Promise of World Peace. In 1987 the Baháʼís helped celebrate the 25th anniversary of the independence of Western Samoa with a commemoration at the Baháʼí House of Worship which included a surprise unveiling of a large portrait of Malietoa, and at a parade for the anniversary Baháʼís won third place in a contest of floats. At the 27th anniversary Baháʼís double purposed the celebration with a service dedicated to World Environment Day which was followed by talks by Baháʼís and head of the Forestry Division of the federal Environmental Program and Tafaese Lautua, a member of Parliament, also thanked the Baháʼís on behalf of the minister of Lands and Survey/Park Preservation. At the 50th anniversary of Malietoa's tenure as paramount chief in 1990, a parade in which forty Baha'is marched for the review of the Malietoa and his guest, the king of Tonga, and entered a float in a parade depicting the oneness of mankind, which placed second in the judging. The float held the grandson of the Malietoa who is also a Baháʼí.

=== Organization and growth ===
In 1977 three summer schools were held in Samoa, one in each of the major islands of Savai'i, Tutuila and Upolu, replacing the usual central summer school held in Lelata, Apia, and the same year the first national children's conference took place. At that time eight of ten planned local centers had been built and there were at least 24 local assemblies. In 1978 the annual convention had 30 delegates to elect the national assembly – and the elected members of that year were Sam Ale Ale, Moli Chang, Reuben Busby, Lilian Ala'i, Fuiono Aniseto, Lina Kava, Khosrow Moghelpour, Fili Pe'epe'e and Leala Tasi. In 1978 an award was given to Baháʼí youth and children who took part in the Samoan Arts Festival; following Baháʼí laws the money award was donated to a humanitarian agency. In 1979 the Baháʼís of Samoa in cooperation with Russ and Gina Garcia produced a film commemorating the International Year of the Child that was shown on television several times in Samoa. In 1981 one hundred fifty people from Samoa, Tuvalu, the Cook Islands, Kiribati, New Zealand and the United States attended a women's conference in Samoa that was planned to commemorate the 50th anniversary of the death of Bahíyyih Khánum. Speakers included the wife and sister of the Malietoa, and the wife of the prime minister of the Cook Islands and a Maori woman from New Zealand.

=== Coordinated efforts ===
Since its inception the religion has had involvement in socio–economic development beginning by giving greater freedom to women, promulgating the promotion of female education as a priority concern, and that involvement was given practical expression by creating schools, agricultural coops, and clinics. The religion entered a new phase of activity when a message of the Universal House of Justice dated 20 October 1983 was released. Baháʼís were urged to seek out ways, compatible with the Baháʼí teachings, in which they could become involved in the social and economic development of the communities in which they lived. World–wide in 1979 there were 129 officially recognized Baháʼí socio–economic development projects. In 1983 the national assembly sponsored a conference on rural development for one hundred–ten people from Upolu, Savaii and Tutuila, at Lelata. In 1986, in addition to an observance held at the Baháʼí House of Worship, (see below), the Baháʼís sponsored a peace essay contest where Certificates of recognition were given to each of 36 finalists and monetary prizes awarded to seven winners. At the ceremony, Lt. Governor Faleomavaega Eni Hunkin and Counsellor Suhayl Ala'i spoke about peace. The Baháʼís also held a conference on Family Welfare and Management with a talk by Western Samoa's assistant secretary for the Ministry of Youth, Sports and Culture, and other talks with 200 Baha'is in attendance. By 1987 worldwide the number of officially recognized development projects had increased to 1482. Samoan Baháʼí youth began to be noticed in the development of the community – three youth were sponsored in 1985 for the International Youth Year and participated in United Nations and international projects. By the 1990s there were Samoan youth workshops (see Oscar DeGruy) performing internationally.

=== Baháʼí House of Worship ===
The site of the future temple was celebrated in 1976 with a gathering of over one hundred Baháʼís and children who sang songs and said prayers for four days. Twenty five years after the first Baháʼí settled in the islands of Samoa the Baháʼí House of Worship in Tiapapata, 8 km from Apia, Samoa, had its cornerstone set in 1979. It was completed in 1984 and serves as the Mother Temple of the Pacific Islands. After three days of talks and celebrations, the Temple was also later dedicated by Malietoa Tanumafili II of Samoa, who was the first sitting Baháʼí head of state. Hand of the Cause Rúhíyyih Khanum was also present at the laying of the cornerstone and its dedication. More than 500 Baháʼís attended at the laying of the cornerstone and guests included members of the Malietoa dynasty; representatives of 16 national assemblies; heads of several departments of the Samoan government and representatives of the churches of Samoa. At the dedication more than 1,000 Baháʼís from 45 countries and islands with civic leaders including the Malietoa and prime minister and other officials. The structure is completely open to the island breezes. The lands of the Temple are also the resting place of Hand of the Cause Ugo Giachery. Perhaps the first large event held at the temple was a special service in 1985 to commemorate the 40th anniversary of the United Nations and to launch the UN International Year of Peace. Among the guests at the service were the Samoan head of state and members of his family including Tooa Salamasina Malietoa; the New Zealand High Commissioner; the Chinese ambassador; consuls from France, the Netherlands, and the United States; and other diplomatic dignitaries. The UN's resident Representative was present, as was the UNESCO Representative and most of the UN personnel in Samoa. Some of the dependencies of a Baháʼí House of Worship have also been developed – a cemetery and school have been set.

== Modern community ==
Across Samoa and American Samoa there are Baháʼí communities in Puleia, Papa–i–Palauli–le–Falefa, Sasina, Pu'apu'a, Faleasi'u–Uta, Faeasi'u–Tai, Laleta, Lepea, Pago Pago, Iliili, Tafuna, and Leone. The Baháʼís of Samoa numbered too few to show up in the 2001 national census. The 2016 census recorded 817 Baháʼí in Samoa, making it the only non-Christian community of any number. There are, however, some reports of oppression of the community.

The Samoan Baháʼí Charitable Trust for Social and Economic Development was established in 1990 and produced Samoa's first television series dedicated to a healthy diet, "O le Kuka Samoa," on 16 October 2000 with Samoan comedian Sumeo, alias "O le King Kuka," and was aimed at rejuvenating Samoan cultural food practices to help provide better nutrition as well as reliance on local resources. The Baháʼí community also maintains five Baháʼí pre–schools across all the islands of Samoa, gains converts, attracts skilled professionals, and a national youth committee is coordinating volunteer youth to come and serve in the Samoan Baháʼí community.

=== 50th Anniversary ===
Representatives of the National Assemblies of Australia, the Cook Islands, Fiji, Hawaii, New Zealand, and Tonga as well as other dignitaries of the religion and Baháʼís from the islands of Savai'i and Upolu and Baháʼí members of the Malietoa family – Samoa's head of state, Malietoa Tanumafili II and his daughter Susuga To'oa Tosi Malietoa – attended the celebration of the 50th anniversary of the Baháʼís Faith in Samoa in 2004 along with various members of the government of Samoa who highlighted many of the services the Baháʼís have given to the general community.

=== Head of State Malietoa Tanumafili II of Samoa ===
On the passing of Head of State Malietoa Tanumafili II of Samoa in 2007, the international governing body of the Baháʼís, the Universal House of Justice wrote: "His service to the people of Samoa as Head of State was distinguished by the high principles, genuine compassion and personal humility that characterized the constancy of his concern for the welfare of all. As the first reigning sovereign to accept the Message of Baháʼu'lláh, he set a record that will forever illumine the annals of our Faith, one that future generations will increasingly extol. His great interest for well–nigh four decades in the Faith's progress was reflected in the enthusiastic affirmation of his belief whenever the opportunity presented itself and in the abiding joy with which he regarded the construction in 1984 of the Mother Temple of the Pacific Islands in Samoa...."

== See also ==
- History of Samoa
- History of American Samoa
- Religion in Samoa
