= Baháʼí Faith in Australia =

The Baháʼí Faith has a long history in Australia. The first known mention of events related to the history of the religion was several reports in Australian newspapers in 1846. After sporadic mentions a turning point was a mention of Australia by ʻAbdu'l-Bahá, the son of the founder of the religion, in 1916 following which United Kingdom/American emigrants John and Clara Dunn came to Australia in 1920. They found people willing to convert to the Baháʼí Faith in several cities while further immigrant Baháʼís also arrived. The first Local Spiritual Assembly was elected in Melbourne followed by the first election of the National Spiritual Assembly in 1934. Iranian Baháʼís had first tried to emigrate to Australia in 1948 but were rejected as "Asiatic" by Australia's White Australia policy. Though the situation was eased in the 1960s and 70s, on the eve of Iranian revolution, in 1978, there were approximately 50-60 Persian Baháʼí families in Australia. Persians, including Baháʼís, arrived in number following the revolution. See persecution of Baháʼís in Iran. Since the 1980s the Baháʼís of Australia have become involved and spoken out on a number of civic issues - from interfaith initiative such as Soul Food to conferences on indigenous issues and national policies of equal rights and pay for work. Baháʼís in Australia include some well known people (see below - National exposure).

The 1996 Census had an optional question on religion that 74% of respondents answered, and of those, 8,947 indicated Baháʼí. The community was counted by census in 2001 to be about 11,000 individuals. Census data from 2016 reported 13,988. The Association of Religion Data Archives (relying on World Christian Database) estimated some 19,365 Baháʼís in 2010.

== Earliest history ==
The first known mention of events related to the history of the religion was several reports in Australian newspapers in 1846:

- Morning Chronicle (later renamed) out of Sydney; 4 April
- South Australian out of Adelaide; 7 April
- South Australian Register out of Adelaide; 11 April

These were reprints of an 1845 article in the London Times which relied on Muslim reactions to the new religion. The next known news story covering events in Baháʼí history was in The Argus, 4 November 1850 in Melbourne which briefly mentions it. In 1853 there was an event with caused great suffering among the Babís (whom Baháʼís regard as spiritual precursors of their religion.) The Babís were blamed for an attempted assassination of the Shah of Persia. Recent scholarship has identified a fringe element distinct from all the major aspects of the religion, its community and leadership at the time, as actually being responsible. Nevertheless, coverage in newspapers at the time often echoed the Persian government's view blaming the Babís and Babís in large numbers were in fact executed as a result.

=== ʻAbdu'l-Bahá's Tablets of the Divine Plan ===
ʻAbdu'l-Bahá wrote a series of letters, or tablets, to the followers of the religion in the United States in 1916–1917; these letters were compiled in Tablets of the Divine Plan. The seventh and eighth of the tablets was the first to mention taking the Baháʼí Faith to Australia and was written on 11 and 19 April 1916, but was delayed in being presented in the United States until 1919 – after the end of World War I and the Spanish flu. These tablets were translated and presented by Mirza Ahmad Sohrab on 4 April 1919, and published in Star of the West magazine on 12 December 1919.

(Tablet 7) "The moment this divine Message is carried forward by the American believers from the shores of America and is propagated through the continents of Europe, of Asia, of Africa and of Australasia, and as far as the islands of the Pacific, this community will find itself securely established upon the throne of an everlasting dominion..., if some teachers go to other islands and other parts, such as the continent of Australia, New Zealand, Tasmania, also to Japan, Asiatic Russia, Korea, French Indochina, Siam, Straits Settlements, India, Ceylon and Afghanistan, most great results will be forthcoming." (Tablet 8) "The teachers traveling in different directions must know the language of the country in which they will enter.… In short, after this universal war, the people have obtained extraordinary capacity to hearken to the divine teachings, for the wisdom of this war is this: That it may become proven to all that the fire of war is world-consuming, whereas the rays of peace are world-enlightening.… Consequently, a number of souls may arise and … and hasten to all parts of the world, especially from America to Europe, Africa, Asia and Australia, and travel through Japan and China."

== Establishment ==
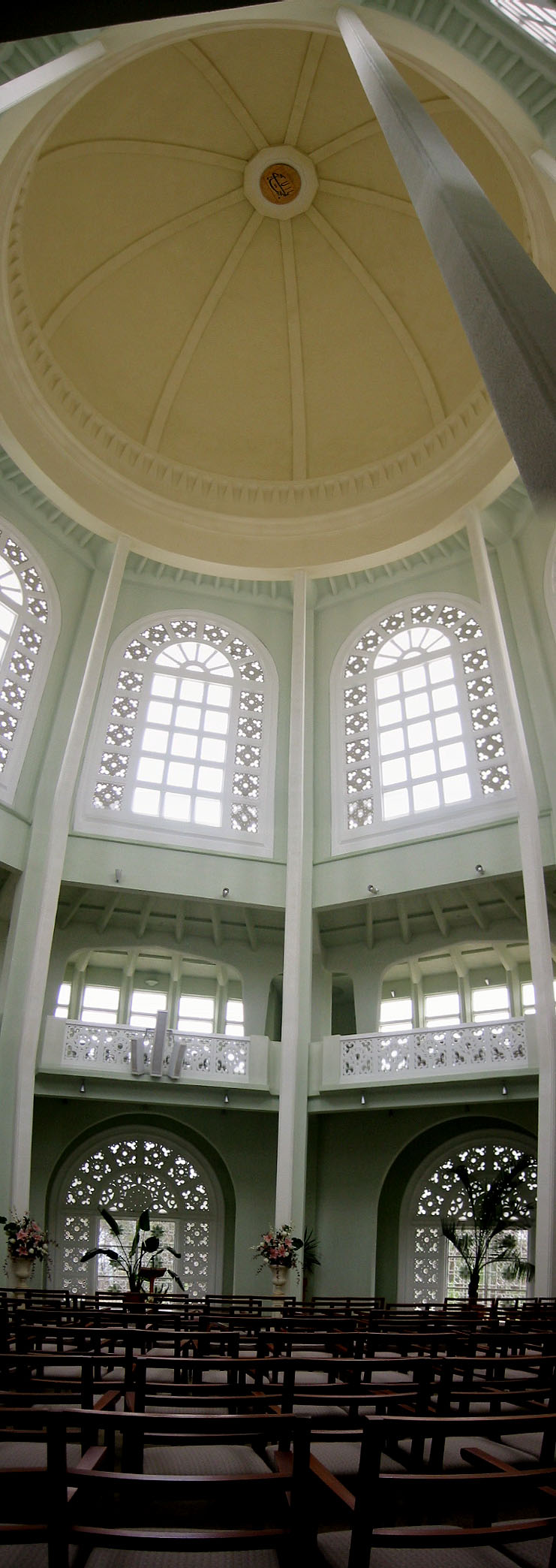
Interior of the Sydney Baháʼí Temple

In 1920 Englishman John Hyde Dunn, and his Irish wife, Clara, sailed to Australia from the United States where they each had emigrated, converted to the religion, met and married. They stopped briefly in Samoa along the way. They were first Baháʼís to set foot in Australia. In 1922 the first Australians joined the religion. They were Oswald Whitaker, a Sydney optometrist, and Effie Baker, a Melbourne photographer who were members of different metaphysical groups. News of John Esslemont's 1915 declaration of faith, and his forthcoming book Baháʼu'lláh and the New Era, had also spread to some of his associates, William and Annie Miller in Australia who then became Baháʼís in the 1920s. Melbourne Baháʼís elected their first Local Spiritual Assembly, the first one of all Australia, in 1923 mostly from single or widowed women. The community struggled to maintain itself for a number of years. The second assembly of Australia was elected in Perth in 1924. World traveling Martha Root spoke at many public meetings on a visit to Melbourne in 1924 and again in 1939. In 1925 Effie Baker left other Australian converts as well as a contingent from New Zealand for trip on pilgrimage where they stayed some 19 days and then visited with the community of the Baháʼí Faith in the United Kingdom. The news journal Herald of the South was begun publishing for New Zealand and Australia during their voyage out of Auckland (transferred publishing to Adelaide Australia in 1931 and then carried on by the national assembly from about 1945.) The Dunns and Martha Root also visited Hobart in Tasmania during which Gretta Lamprill converted and continued to sustain the religion on the island - eventually she was elected to the National Spiritual Assembly and later was named a Knight of Baháʼu'lláh together with Glad Parke, who travelled with her to the Society Islands (now French Polynesia) in the Eastern Pacific Ocean. During Roots subsequent visits each time the Baháʼí community grew in Tasmania.

Following a temporary move of Margaret Dixson to Sydney from Melbourne who helped elect the first local spiritual assembly of Sydney in 1925 (eventually Margaret Dixson, an early Esperantist pioneered to Brisbane, and Adelaide.) While many of the early converts refused to stay Baháʼís when pressed to leave their former associations many others did join the religion. By 1928 a list shows Australia with 6 local spiritual assemblies each with 9 members plus the general community. There was a 1929 notice in the Sydney Morning Herald of a talk on ʻAbdu'l-Bahá.

== Expansion ==
Soon Baháʼí groups sprang up around the country. By 1934 there were enough Baháʼís to elect a national governing body, the first National Spiritual Assembly of the Baháʼís of Australia and New Zealand. The delegates were: Robert Brown, Silver Jackman, Hilda Brooks; A.O. Whittaker, Hyde Dunn, Olive Routh; and from New Zealand Mrs. E. Axford, Ethel Blundell, and Margaret Stevenson. During the 1940s there was opposition published to the religion. The first secretary of the national assembly, Hilda Brooks, wrote many responses to various public attacks. For 6 weeks in 1943 the editor of the Mittagong Star entertained an exchange of letters to the editor between her and a Catholic priest and scholar who had chosen to describe the religion as an outgrowth of Islam. That same year the Sydney Morning Herald listed several talks by Baháʼís. In 1945 she responded to remarks of a former missionary to Iran, in Adelaide's Church Guardian. In 1957 New Zealand separated to form its own National Assembly. The National Assembly established the Baháʼí Quarterly publication in 1936. The first pioneer to reach New Caledonia was Australia's Margaret Rowling in early 1952. Lilian Wyss pioneered to Western Samoa from Australia in January 1954 leaving behind a position on the National Spiritual Assembly of Australia at the age of 24 while her brother, Frank Wyss, introduced the religion that year to the Cocos Island. For their service, Shoghi Effendi awarded both of them the accolade of Knight of Baháʼu'lláh. In 1955 Fred Murray of South Australia was among the first Aboriginal people to become a Baháʼí. Elizabeth Hindson was the first Indigenous Australian elected to serve as a member of the National Spiritual Assembly of the Bahá'ís of Australia. After decades of service in the Australian community, Collis Featherstone was distinguished by being appointed as a Hand of the Cause of God in 1957 (d.1990) and he and four other Hands were present at the first international conference hosted by the Australian Baháʼí community in March 1958 when almost 200 Baháʼís from 17 Baháʼí communities gathered: Iran, Pakistan, (S) Korea, Japan, Southeast Asia, Tonga, New Guinea, Papua, New Hebrides, New Caledonia, Solomon Islands, Samoa, Cook Islands, Fiji, New Zealand, Formosa, and the United States. Part of the ceremonies carried out was the dedication of the Temple site.

=== Yerrinbool Baháʼí School ===
Since its inception the religion has had involvement in socio-economic development beginning by giving greater freedom to women, promulgating the promotion of female education as a priority concern, and that involvement was given practical expression by creating schools, agricultural coops, and clinics. In 1937, one hundred delegates and observers attending the national Baháʼí convention in Sydney celebrated the founding of the Yerrinbool Baháʼí School which was next to "Bolton Place" founded just the year before. Kitchen and dining facilities were added in 1946. In 1947 non-Baháʼí speakers Harold Morton, a Sydney radio announcer, and Muslim Fazel (Frank) Khan presented at the school and the Khan family converted shortly thereafter. By 1963 the Yerrinbool Baháʼí School was wholly owned and managed by the National Spiritual Assembly. The second national youth conference was held at Yerrinbool in 1970 and succeeding youth conferences were held in Canberra (1972), Adelaide (1973), Perth (1974), Canberra (1975), Brisbane (1976), Sydney (1977), Hobart (1978), and Melbourne (1979). In 1983 the schools program included summer, spring and autumn schools, three deepening institutes, an annual studies conference, a "Third World Awareness" weekend sponsored by the Sydney Baháʼí youth, Baháʼís studies conferences sponsored by the University of Tasmania Baháʼí Society which lead to the initial formation of the Association for Baháʼí Studies chapter in Australia whose first meeting was at Yerrinbool. More recently, Yerringbool Baháʼí School was formally registered as a not-for-profit college in Australia under the name of Yerringbool Baháʼí Center for Learning Ltd. (YBCL) which operates two divisions of Education for Peace Institute of Australia, and Yerrinbool College.

=== Development in other states ===
Baháʼís in Brisbane were established as early as 1928 but it was not until 1949 that a local spiritual assembly was elected. A Bahaʼi Society was established on the campus of the University of Queensland in 1961. By 1978 there were Local Assemblies in Albert Shire, Brisbane, Gold Coast, Mornington Island and Palm Island, Pioneer Shire, Redland Shire, Toowoomba and Townsville, as well as groups in Gympie, Ipswich, Mackay, Mulgrave Shire, Murweh Shire, Noosa Shire, Rockhampton Wondai Shire and Caboolture in 1983. In 1987, local assemblies in Queensland numbered 25.

Refocussing attention on the Melbourne community active projects were initiated and the assembly was reformed in 1948. The members of that local spiritual assembly were Emily and Cyril Easey, Ron Cover and his mother Irene Cover, Freda Adams, Mrs E. Bennett, Madam Holden-Graham, Eleanor Wheeler, and Vi Hoehnke and by 1953 communities near Melbourne included Ballarat and Geelong however reorganizing along civic boundaries in 1957 spit the Melbourne community into Melbourne, Camberwell, Malvern, Caufield, Oakleigh, Mordialloc and Brighton.

In an atmosphere of growing tension over war, in October 1940 Gretta Lamprill in Tasmania was visited by government officers seeking information about the group's activities and from then on the Baháʼís consciously sought out collaboration with like-minded social movements and involved academics and outstanding public figures of the day in their public meetings. In 1945 the only group of Baháʼís in Tasmania were in Hobart - consisting of six people. By 1949 the Hobart community was able to elect its local spiritual assembly with founding members of Frank & Myra Brown, Mabel Bailey, Kit Crowder, Eileen Costello, Katherine Harcus, Gretta Lamprill, Katie Pharaoh, and Ben Raynor. Shirin Fozdar visited Tasmania in September 1952 for several talks before going on to introduce the religion to Vietnam in 1954. In 1958 the Hobart community hosted a Tasmanian Baháʼí conference with representatives from Launceston, Clarence, and Glenorchy in June 1957.

In 1982, the Canberra Baháʼí community was one of five communities asked by the Universal House of Justice to host a conference in commemoration of the 50th anniversary of the death of Bahíyyih Khánum.

=== Iranian immigrants ===
In 1948, Iranian Baháʼís seeking to emigrate to Australia were classified as "Asiatic" by Australia's White Australia policy, and were denied entry and the policy largely remained in place until the 1960s and was lifted in 1973. The size and diversity of the community was boosted in the 1980s when Australia opened its doors to those fleeing the resurgence of persecution of Baháʼís in Iran, characterized as a diaspora. In 1981 the Minister for Immigration announced a Special Humanitarian Assistance Program for Iranians to seek refuge in Australia. By 1986, 538 Persian Baháʼís had entered Australia under the program, and by 1988, some 2,500 had arrived in Australia through either the Assistance or Refugee Programs. Together with Persians already living in Australia, Persian constituted 38% of the Australian Baháʼí community where majorities of Iranians formed in 59 of 169 Baháʼí communities that had local assemblies, and in 19 Baháʼí communities, more than 75% of the members were Persian. See also Iranian Australians.

=== Sydney Baháʼí Temple ===
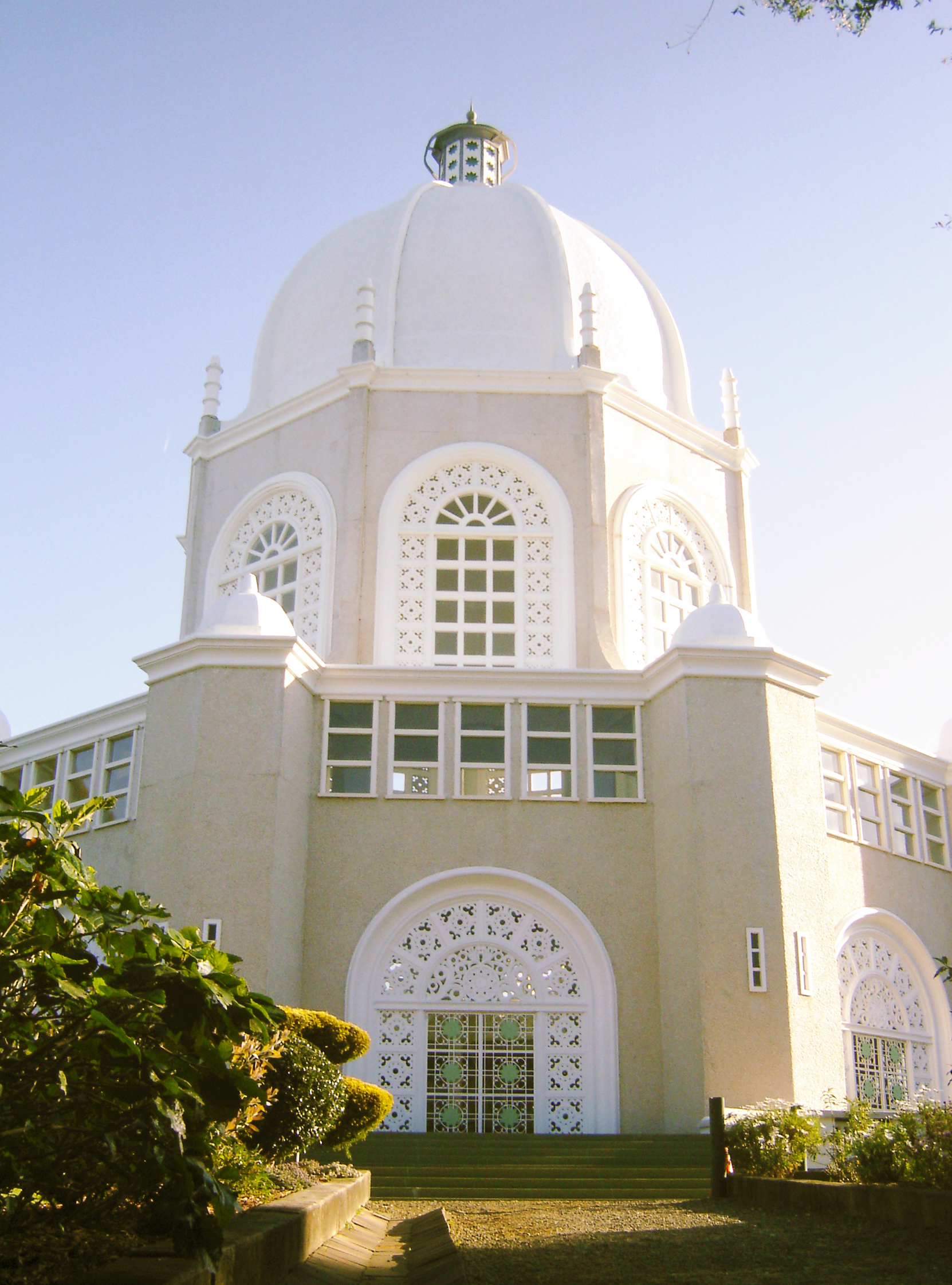
Sydney Baháʼí Temple

The Sydney Baháʼí Temple, the world's fourth Baháʼí House of Worship, was dedicated on 17 September 1961 and opened to the public after four years of construction in Sydney's Ingleside suburb. The initial design by Charles Mason Remey was approved in 1957 with seating for six hundred people. The building stands 38 metres in height, has a diameter at its widest point of 20 metres, and is a highly visible landmark from Sydney's northern beaches. It's surrounded by gardens contain native plants including waratahs, several grevillea including the unique caleyi, Australian wattle (Acacia) and woody pear, plus three species of eucalypts. Other buildings located on the site include a visitor's centre, bookshop, picnic area, hostel, caretaker's cottage, and the administrative offices of the Australian Baháʼí community. The property is set high in a natural bushland setting of 380,000 square metres (38 hectares) in Ingleside, a northern suburb overlooking the Pacific Ocean. This Temple serves as the Mother Temple of Australia.

Six conferences held in October 1967 around the world presented a viewing of a copy of the photograph of Baháʼu'lláh on the highly significant occasion commemorating the centenary of Baháʼu'lláh's writing of the Suriy-i-Mulúk (Tablet to the Kings), which Shoghi Effendi describes as "the most momentous Tablet revealed by Baháʼu'lláh". After a meeting in Edirne (Adrianople), Turkey, the Hands of the Cause travelled to the conferences, 'each bearing the precious trust of a photograph of the Blessed Beauty, which it will be the privilege of those attending the Conferences to view.' Hand of the Cause Ugo Giachery conveyed this photograph to the Conference for Australasia at Australia at the House of Worship.

== Multiplying interests ==
The Baháʼís of Australia have taken up efforts in a number of interests - internal and with respect to the civic discourse in Australia. In 1975 the Australian Baháʼí Publishing Trust was established and in 1984 the Australian branch of the Association of Baháʼí Studies was formed. Representing the religion to the broader public the Baháʼís developed a voluntary program in Australian public/state schools for 30 minutes a week on religious classes (called Special Religious Education, open to all religions.) The Baháʼís developed a Peace Pack that was approved by the State's Department of Education and Training starting in the 1980s. Some 6,000 primary school children, about 10% of Baháʼí families, among more than 300 state-run schools attended in 2007. And informally since 2002 the Baháʼís of Adelaide, (and formally since 2003 by the Adelaide Local Spiritual Assembly) has run the Soul Food event - a once a month 1 hour program of readings from religious and non-religious texts mixed with music performed by a variety of Adelaide's professional musicians in the Art Gallery of South Australia's Auditorium during which no financial contribution is asked for or accepted and no promotions are permitted. The event has since developed similar events in other locations in Australia.

The religion entered a new phase of activity when a message of the Universal House of Justice dated 20 October 1983 was released. Baháʼís were urged to seek out ways, compatible with the Baháʼí teachings, in which they could become involved in the social and economic development of the communities in which they lived. Worldwide in 1979 there were 129 officially recognized Baháʼí socio-economic development projects. By 1987, the number of officially recognized development projects had increased to 1482.

For the International Year of Indigenous Peoples and the Australian Association for Baháʼí Studies set their annual conference in 1993 (at Queensland University) on an Indigenous related theme on building a positive understanding of Native title. In 1993 the Arrernte tribe co-sponsors an intercultural celebration, Heart of Australia Calling. In 1997 the Association for Baháʼí Studies produced a book Indigenous Peoples: In the Wake of Mabo as a followup (see Mabo v Queensland.) In closing the UN International Decade of Indigenous Peoples (1993–2004) it held another conference (at Macquarie University) but this time ensuring as great a level of participation by Indigenous participants and keynote speakers and as many female participants and keynote speakers as possible and other similar priorities in order that the views and needs of Indigenous Peoples could be seriously heard and discussed and of practical benefit.

In 2003 the Australian Baháʼí Community testified in support of Australian Human Rights Commission Legislation Bill of 2003 suggesting that reviews of its provisions should be considered in light of the Paris Principles. In 2005 it testified to the Human Rights and Equal Opportunity Commission of Australia making suggestions on a variety of issues affecting the challenges to equal rights and work/employment and pay for work. In 2007 YWCA Australia's WomenSpeak Network submitted a paper to the Australian Government through the Federal Office for Women to delegations addressing the United Nations Commission on the Status of Women. Their statement mentions that most women's groups did not believe the role of men and boys in achieving gender equality caught the imagination of many of the organisations involved in the WomenSpeak Network. They specified a notable exception of this position is of the Australian Baháʼí Community Office of Equality in that many men in the Baháʼí community play an active role in working towards gender equality.

== National exposure ==
From the 1980s onward various personalities associated with the Baháʼí Faith have been national figures in Australia. Combined with the swelling membership the religion has emerged from obscurity in Australia on national level. The first mark of this emergence is probably a graduate of the University of Sydney, Tom Price. He was musical director of the Sydney Baháʼí Temple Choir in Australia for 14 years and became well known in Australia when he produced and co-wrote the double-platinum Bad Habits album by singer Billy Field, which was the largest selling album in Australia in 1981. Price went on eventually to be director of the 420-voice choir and 90-piece symphony orchestra for the second Baháʼí World Congress in New York in 1992 and many other notable events. In 1986 Jack Malardy and his wife, tribal leaders of the Karadjari, joined the religion. In the mid and late 1990s Cathy Freeman added some awareness of the religion in Australia as an Aboriginal Olympic medalist who grew up as a Baháʼí. In 2001 the 2nd edition of A Practical Reference to Religious Diversity for Operational Police and Emergency Services added the Baháʼí Faith in its coverage of religions in Australia. A TV medical-drama called MDA - Medical Defense Australia, which went on the air on 23 July 2002 through 2005 with an ongoing Baháʼí character, Layla Young, played by a non-Baháʼí actress Petra Yared. And Luke McPharlin has been visible as a distinguished Australian footballer who mentioned his spiritual beliefs in his reasons for his sportsmanship. In 2015 news articles appeared covering various people - a singer, a refugee family, and a community elder.

== Size and Demographics ==
The 1996 Census had an optional question on religion that 74% of respondents answered, and of those, 8,947 indicated Baháʼí. The community was counted by census in 2001 to be about 11,000 individuals. Census data from 2016 reported 13,988. The Association of Religion Data Archives (relying on World Christian Database) estimated some 19,365 Baháʼís in 2010.

The community of Whitehorse had some 200 Baháʼís in 2008. In 1998 Baháʼís in the state of Victoria celebrated their 75th anniversary and counted approximately 1600 adults, youth, and children, organised in more than 50 communities, with 29 local assemblies in the Melbourne metropolitan area with public events where hundreds of people come.

In 2008 the Tasmanian Baháʼí community neared the opening of its Baháʼí Center in Hobart with assemblies in Clarence, Devonport, Glenorchy, Kingborough and Launceston and more than 300 on the island.

== See also ==
- Religion in Australia
- Baháʼí Faith in New Zealand
- Baháʼí statistics
- List of religious populations

== Publications ==
- Letters from the Guardian to Australia and New Zealand Author: Shoghi Effendi, Source: Australia, 1971 reprint.
- Arohanui: Letters from Shoghi Effendi to New Zealand Author: Shoghi Effendi Source: Baháʼí Publishing Trust of Suva, Fiji Islands, 1982 edition.
- The History of the Baháʼí Faith in Australia (flash video)
- The Randwick Bahai Community The Randwick Bahai Community: a A Survey of 75 years, by Graham Hassall, published by the Local Spiritual Assembly of the Baháʼís of Randwick, Oct 1997.
