= Baháʼí Faith in Italy =

The Baháʼí Faith in Italy dates from 1899 - the earliest known date for Baháʼís in Italy. Baháʼí sources currently claim about 3,000 adherents in Italy in over 300 locations across Italy. The Association of Religion Data Archives (relying mostly on projections from the World Christian Encyclopedia) estimated there were some 5,000 Baháʼís in Italy in 2005.

ʻAbdu'l-Bahá, head of the religion from 1892 to 1921, wrote two letters to Italian Baháʼís and mentioned Italy a few times addressing issues of war and peace as well. Though several people joined the religion before World War II by the end there may have been just one Baháʼí in the country. Soon a wave of pioneers was coordinated with the first Baháʼís to arrive were Angeline and Ugo Giachery. By Ridván 1948 the first Baháʼí Local Spiritual Assembly of Rome was elected. There were six communities across Italy and Switzerland when a regional national assembly was formed in 1953. The Italian Baháʼís elected their own National Spiritual Assembly in 1962. A survey of the community in 1963 showed 14 assemblies and 18 smaller communities. Major conferences held in Italy include the Palermo Conference of 1968 to commemorate from the movement of Baháʼu'lláh, the founder of the religion, from Gallipoli to the prison in Acre and the 2009 regional conference for southern Europe in Padua about the progress of the religion.

== Early phase ==
Just before the founding of modern Italy Baháʼu'lláh addressed a message to Pope Pius IX a few years before the unification of the Kingdom of Italy. It was part of the series entitled Súriy-i-Haykal or Tablet of the Temple which was collected in English as part of the Summons of the Lord of Hosts.

As early as 1899 there were two Baháʼís in Italy - Edith Burr in Florence and Maria Forni. Burr was an American and a book of her poetry was published. Forni was of Polish extraction, lived in Ticino initially where she ran a private school for children with disabilities and presented Baháʼí teachings but soon she moved to Crevenna near Lake Como. Both had died by 1930. Burr was the recipient of two letters from ʻAbdu'l-Bahá. It was in November 1900 that Agnes Alexander learned of the religion while visiting family in Rome. While there she met Charlotte Dixon, an American Baháʼí who was just returning from a Baháʼí pilgrimage.

=== Links with ʻAbdu'l-Bahá ===
Juliet Thompson, a prominent early Baháʼí from the United States, went through Italy in 1909 on Baháʼí pilgrimage to meet ʻAbdu'l-Bahá. Another, Horace Holley had set out for Europe in 1909 and met Bertha Herbert during the voyage. Herbert loaned him Myron Phelps' book about ʻAbdu'l-Bahá and Holley soon joined the religion. Herbert and Holley were married in October 1909 and settled in Italy. They then met ʻAbdu'l-Baha on both of his trips to Europe, and lived in Italy until 1912, when they moved to Paris. Maria Forni was among those who visited ʻAbdu'l-Bahá when he arrived in Switzerland in 1911 on his first trip to the West. On his second trip ʻAbdu'l-Bahá and his retinue boarded the RMS Cedric in Alexandria, Egypt bound for Naples where they arrived on March 28, 1912, though they did not disembark for fear of being confused with Turks during the ongoing Italo-Turkish War. Several Baháʼís from America and Britain boarded the ship to travel with them. A youthful Shoghi Effendi had accompanied ʻAbdu'l-Bahá from Egypt but was refused further passage by reason of a minor illness and was taken ashore, though all were not convinced of the sincerity of the diagnosis and some presumed it was ill will against the voyagers as if they were Turkish. The American Baháʼís had sent thousands of dollars for the journey, urging ʻAbdu'l-Bahá to leave the Cedric in Italy and travel to England to sail on the maiden voyage of the RMS Titanic. Instead he returned the money for charity and continued the voyage on the Cedric. Later a survivor met with him asking why he didn't go on the Titanic and he suggested "God inspires man's heart." Later in April 1912 ʻAbdu'l-Bahá is recorded addressing that war:

What a great tribulation there is in the countries of Italy and Turkey in these days! The fathers hear of the death of their sons and the sons are distressed on hearing the news of the death of their fathers. What cities are laid to ruin and what rising fortunes are thrown to the winds! The antidote for this great ill is world peace, which is the source of universal tranquillity.

While in the United States ʻAbdu'l-Bahá had dedicated the site of the North American Baháʼí House of Worship. By 1915 Italian Baháʼís were among those contributing to its construction. After his return to Egypt ʻAbdu'l-Bahá again took up mention of Italy and war. He wrote a series of letters, or tablets, to the followers of the religion in the United States in 1916–1917; these letters were compiled together in the book Tablets of the Divine Plan. The seventh of the tablets mentioned European regions and was written on April 11, 1916, but was delayed in being presented in the United States until 1919—after the end of the First World War and the Spanish flu. The seventh tablet was translated and presented on April 4, 1919, and published in Star of the West magazine on December 12, 1919, and mentioned Italy. He says:

"In brief, this world-consuming war has set such a conflagration to the hearts that no word can describe it. In all the countries of the world the longing for universal peace is taking possession of the consciousness of men. There is not a soul who does not yearn for concord and peace. A most wonderful state of receptivity is being realized.… Therefore, O ye believers of God! Show ye an effort and after this war spread ye the synopsis of the divine teachings in the British Isles, France, Germany, Austria-Hungary, Russia, Italy, Spain, Belgium, Switzerland, Norway, Sweden, Denmark, Holland, Portugal, Rumania, Serbia, Montenegro, Bulgaria, Greece, Andorra, Liechtenstein, Luxembourg, Monaco, San Marino, Balearic Isles, Corsica, Sardinia, Sicily, Crete, Malta, Iceland, Faroe Islands, Shetland Islands, Hebrides and Orkney Islands."

=== Developments after World War I ===
Well known early Japanese Baháʼí Saichiro Fujita took a steamer to Italy about 1919–20, where he awaited ʻAbdu'l-Bahá's wire for him to proceed to Haifa. There was communication noted with Baháʼís in Italy in 1923. Imogene Hoagg was noted as present in Florence in 1925. Marion Jack sailed for Italy during January, 1926. Anne Lynch fled Russia at the end of the first World War to settle in England and she accepted the Baháʼí Faith immediately upon first hearing of it in Italy in 1926 and then settled in Switzerland. A 1925 list of "leading local Baháʼí Centres" of Europe listed one in Italy. In 1930 a Baháʼí from Baghdad, a Mr. Toeg, was said to have moved to Milan. The first formal vote of international sanctions against aggression, taken in 1936 by the League of Nations, when Fascist Italy invaded Ethiopia causing the Second Italo-Abyssinian War, was hailed by Shoghi Effendi, head of the religion from 1921 to 1957, as: "an event without parallel in human history". On May 25, 1940, Shoghi Effendi and Rúhíyyih Khanum obtained passports for Britain while in Rome - a few days later Italy entered World War II.

=== Redevelopment after World War II ===
Geresina Campani of Florence may have been the only Baháʼí to remain alive and active through World War II. Starting in 1946 Shoghi Effendi drew up plans for the American Baháʼí community to send pioneers to Europe; the pioneers set up a European Teaching Committee chaired by Edna True. Possibly the first Baháʼís after WWII to enter Italy were Angeline and Ugo Giachery. They reached Naples on 20 February 1947 and sent a telegram to Shoghi Effendi from Rome. By the end of March the first Italian convert was enrolled in Genoa. He was Augnsto Salvetti who heard of the religion from a Persian believer while he was a prisoner of war in India and investigated the religion on return to Italy. Brother Rodolfo Salvetti soon followed joining the religion - and pioneers Mr. and Mrs. Phillip Marengella arrived in Italy by mid-1947. There was also one Baháʼí in Milan - perhaps a Turkish refugee. By early 1948 two more Italians had joined the religion - Verena Venturini and Luigi Peveri. By Ridván 1948 the first Local Spiritual Assembly of Rome was elected. In 1948, Marion Little pioneered to Florence from America. Well known Baháʼí Dorothy Beecher Baker who was later named as a Hand of the Cause undertook a trip from 1948 across Europe including visiting Italy. Publications in Italian began with an introductory pamphlet which was sent to prominent citizens and to four hundred public libraries. This was followed by a new edition of John Esslemont's Baháʻu'lláh and the New Era, a special copy of which, bound in tooled green leather, was sent to the archives of the Baháʼí Faith in Palestine. Until 1964 when she returned to America, she served as chairman of the Italian Publishing Committee, a field which gave scope to her artistic and administrative skills. Under her direction and guidance many of the major Writings of the Faith were translated into Italian and published. She died in 1980 and her body buried in Cap d'Ail Cemetery, near Monaco. William Sutherland Maxwell came to Italy to begin reviewing materials for the expansion of the Shrine of the Bab in 1948 which continued through 1951 with shipments to Palestine for the project. Architect Andrea Rocca, professor emeritus of the Beaux Arts Academy of Carrara, assisted in work with the Shrine as well as the later International Archives building. The first all-Baháʼí Italian family came to be in April 1949 followed by the conversion of 81-year-old Giuseppe Berardi by July.

== Growth of the religion ==
=== Leading up to the election of the Regional Assembly ===
The early 1950s was a big period for development of the religion in Italy. The local assemblies of Florence and Naples were elected first in 1951. Orientalist Alessandro Bausani joined the religion before April 1951 - eventually he was professor emeritus and Director of the School of Oriental Studies and the Institute of Islamic Studies at the University of Rome "La Sapienza", and he was a member of the "Lincei" National Academy. He helped sustain every institution or committee, national or local, on which he was called to serve. Emily Maude Waterworth Bosio ("Maud Bosio") was 54 years of age when she joined the religion in January 1953. During her fifteen years of service, Bosio was usually a member of the assembly of Florence. And the Baháʼí community in Sicily began in 1953.

==== First Italo-Swiss Convention ====
There were six communities across Italy and Switzerland who elected 19 delegates who gathered for the convention to elect a regional national assembly in the city of Florence in the presence of Hand of the Cause Paul E. Haney and Ugo Giachary and Edna True, Chairman of the European Teaching Committee and who represented the National Spiritual Assembly of the United States at the proceedings. The proceedings included announcements of letters of ʻAbdu'l-Bahá to Italians, noted the attendance of 18 of the 19 delegates, elected the officers of the convention, welcomed guests, discussed the progress of the religion in the region, the role of the Baháʼí institutions, celebrated the Ridván events, and the actual secret ballot election of the national assembly. Its first members were: Dr. Ugo Giachery, Friedrich Schar, Dr. Alessandro Bausani, Marion Little, Prof. Mario Fiorentini, Anna Kunz, Stella Lanzar, Anne Lynch, and Elsa Steinmetz. Letters from the eleven other national assemblies then in existence were shared and there was an announcement that these assemblies were welcomed to a continental conference in Sweden later in the same year. Workshops at the convention were held on Baháʼí administration and tributes paid to various firsts in the community. A public session was then held at which Ugo Giachery spoke on the theme of a universal fermentation giving rise to civilization. Alessandro Bausani was a member of this regional assembly during all the years of its existence.

=== Leading up to the election of the National Assembly ===
In October 1953 Marie Ciocca moved to Cagliari in Sardinia and was appointed by Shoghi Effendi as a Knight of Baháʼu'lláh. In January 1954 it was announced Hand of the Cause Dorothy Beecher Baker had died in a plane crash near the island of Elba en route to Rome from Pakistan where she had toured after helping an international conference in India. In February that all the goals assigned to Italy and Switzerland had all been settled by pioneers: Liechtenstein, Monaco, San Marino, and the islands of Sicily, Sardinia and Rhodes. In September Italy and Switzerland held its first summer school - 75 Baháʼís attended the classes held in Bex les Bains. Following the work on the Shrine of the Báb further contracts were signed for materials and work for the International Archives building. The 3rd convention of the election of the Italo-Swiss assembly noted local assemblies had been elected in the goal location of Monte Carlo, Monaco. On 9 May 1955, following disruption of the Baháʼí community of Tehran Iran, the Shah's personal physician, Abdol Karim Ayadi, a Baháʼí, was told to leave the country for a while. For this reason he went to Italy for about nine months. Rita van Sombeek had been living in the Netherlands from 1947 but moved to Italy in the early 1950s where she served the interests of the religion. In 1955 the national center building of the Baháʼís of Italy was dedicated in Rome. After causing Baháʼí divisions in 1957, Charles Mason Remey, took up residence in Florence where he died in April 1974. The local assembly of Palermo was first elected in 1958. That year former operatic soprano Maria Montana began to come to Italy. The first spiritual assemblies of Genoa and Milan were elected in 1959. By 1959 Italian Julio Savi was an active Baháʼí doing work in Ethiopia. Italian Augusto Robiati also became a Baháʼí in Ethiopia and Savi and Robiati later returned to Italy. In years to come Robiati would win peace and literary prizes. In 1959 Italian materials, after being part of the Shrine of the Báb and the building of the International Archives, began to be incorporated into the Baháʼí House of Worship in Kampala. The first local assemblies of Venice, Turin, and Perugia were all elected in 1960 (the first Baha'i arrived in Perugia in 1959.) Baháʼís with a background or interest in pioneering gathered in Rome in November 1960 and discussed goals remaining in the country in three languages as well as holding classes on the subjects of the Universal House of Justice and "Catholic Psychology and Baháʼí Faith" and other topics. Hand of the Cause Enoch Olinga visited many places including Sicily and mainland Italy in 1960 and again in 1971. Julio Savi was a member of the local assembly of Bologna which first formed April 1961 while the first Trieste, Padua, and Bari assemblies also formed. Hand of the Cause Shuʼáʼu'lláh ʻAláʼí visited the Baháʼís of Milan in 1961. In early 1962 Hand of the Cause ʻAlí-Akbar Furútan visited Baháʼís in Florence and Milan. The 1962 edition of the Italian Books and Periodicals, a review of Italian language publications by the government listed Le lezioni di San Giovanni d'Acri which was an independent translation of Some Answered Questions.

==== Public meetings ====
Through 1961-2 various public meetings began to be held. In February 1961 a joint conference of the Baháʼís of two cities of Venice and Padua reviewed the progress of the religion there while a public meeting for the Baháʼí Naw-Rúz gathered Baháʼís and guests from Bologna, Florence, Padua, Rimini, and San Marino. In October there were three events held to honor the United Nations. The first two were talks by Dr. Alessandro Bausani, member of the Italo-Swiss National Assembly and professor of oriental languages at the Universities of Rome and Naples, on the theme of "United Nations and a United World" in Florence and Bologna. The third event was Auxiliary Board member Mario Piarulli who spoke in Padua about the UN before an international audience. A feature writer of the Socialist newspaper Avanti interviewed Bausani, and then wrote an account, not only of the meeting but also of the religion in general. A public initiative in Turin drew about eighty people from Genoa, Milan, and Turin to hear Ugo Giachery speak about his slide-illustrated recent visit to Central America. This was followed by a series of six public meetings to give anyone interested an opportunity to investigate the religion. The average attendance was about seventy. In Bologna a public meeting was held where the audience heard Dr. Giachery on "Baháʼí approaches to modern problems". Another public meeting took place in Padua among youth.

==== Italian National Assembly and community snapshot ====
In 1962 the Italian Baháʼí community elected its own National Spiritual Assembly. Its first members were: David Ned Blackmer Hossein Mahboubi, Teresa Taffa, Augusto Robiati, Heshmat Moayyad, Mario Fiorentini, Manutcher Majzub, Hossein Avaregan, and Mario Piarulli. Bausani was a member of the National Spiritual Assembly of Italy for twenty years until 1984. A total of 141 Baháʼís came to the first Italian summer school, held in September near Rimini. Non-Baha'is also participated in some of the classes. Hand of the Cause Ugo Giachery gave a talk on "The Historical, Religious and Literary Work of Shoghi Effendi."

In 1963 the members of the national assemblies then in existence were the delegates for the first election of the Universal House of Justice. The members of the Italian assembly were Professor Hossein Avaregan, Alessandro Bausani, David Ned Blackmer, Professor Mario Fiorentini, Manoutchehr Madjzoub, Hossein Mahboubi, Mario Piarulli, Augusto Robiati, and Teresa Taffa; six of whom were able to attend the convention itself.

The Baháʼí communities of Italy in 1963 were:

Assemblies
Bari	Bologna	Florence	Genoa	Milan	Naples	Padua	Palermo	Perugia	Rome	Trieste	Turin	Venice
Groups
Cagliari	Como	Laterina	Mantua	Parma	Pisogne	Rimini	Siena					
Isolated Baháʼís
Ghiffa	Lecce	Mercatello sul Metauro	Messina	Meta	Pioltello	Pisa	Poggibonsi	Roncade	Sassari			

Maria Montana was known in Bari Bahá'í community between 1963 and 1966. There is a picture of her there in 1964; the community rose from 2 to 20 members and elected its first local assembly in 1967.

== Development as a national community ==
=== Public meetings ===
In 1963 Baháʼí Mrs. Meherangiz Munsiff of England, formerly of India, toured six cities with Indian art and slides of temples and holy places. In 1965 the International Club of the University of Padua invited the Baháʼís to give a talk on the religion. Human Rights Day observances with Baháʼís were also scheduled in many Italian cities - Bologna, Mantua, Padua, Milan, Genoa, Turin and Florence. In December 1966 the Baháʼís of Milan held two public conferences with members of various cultural clubs, the Press Club and others. Professor Bausani gave a presentation at the Cultural and Artistic Club of the University of Padua on religions that originated in Persia - the Baháʼí Faith in particular. In 1968 public meetings were held in Perugia, Milan, Anacapri, and in Palermo at Fiera del Mediterraneo. A public meeting for about 250 people was held at the town theater in Rimini in November 1968 with a piano recital and talk by Prof. Bausani. In May 1969 Prof. Bausani gave a talk at a public meeting in Lipari at which some 60 people attended - the subject was on "the atomic age and the crisis in today's society" and mentioned the religion. The series of events drew a week of attention in Mantua in November 1969. The aim was to reach the greater part of the population of the city and have the Faith known, at least in name. Copies of The Proclamation of Baháʼu'lláh were presented to leading local dignitaries and a number of events were held: public conferences, round-table discussions, a concert, and slide shows. World Religion Day was observed by the Baháʼís in Rome with an interfaith public round table discussion at the Accademia Tiberina on the theme of "Religion as an instrument of peace and unity". In May 1971 a public event was held on Ischia island with youth performers. The Baháʼís of Rimini held a conference in October 1975 in observance of International Women's Year. The city of Milan invited the Baháʼís for a public presentation so the Baháʼís organized a series of six lectures on various Baháʼí teachings.

=== Youth opportunities ===
The 1964 summer school was held in Bellaria, Guy Murchie was among the teachers of that year. The 1965 Italian summer school was held again in Bellaria near Rimini. This year the committee doubled reserved rooms and did so for two weeks instead of one. Happily 284 Baháʼís attended from sixteen countries and more than twenty non-Baha'is attended. Two Hands of the Cause were present to teach classes - John Ferraby ("The Charters of the Cause of God,") and Abu'l-Qásim Faizi ("The Meaning of History from the Baháʼí Point of View"). The following year among the presentators for the 287 students was Dr. Firuz Kazemzadeh, former chairman of the National Assembly of the United States, and Prof. Alessandro Bausani, who, in addition to giving two courses, translated for the English, Persian and French speaking teachers. In 1965 the youth of Milan began holding weekend classes and a national youth committee was operating. A Youth Symposium was held at Rimini in March 1967 with over 120 attending; a graduate of the first training institute gave the public talk. The sixth Italian summer school took place at Contursi, near Naples, in September, 1967, with 169 participants from thirteen countries. Speakers and teachers of classes included Prof. Bausani and Dr. Giachery, Mr. Rosapepe, the attorney who obtained the recognition of the Faith in Italy and owner of the hotel where the school was held, Philip Hainsworth, member of the National Spiritual Assembly of the British Isles, Auxiliary Board member Dr. Eric Blumenthal, Augusto Robiati, Auxiliary Board member James Holmlund. The youth organized round-table discussions and afterwards a public conference was organized at the University Club. In the spring of 1968 the National Youth Committee of Italy organized a school at Passignano on the shores of Lake Trasimeno with 110 attendees. In September 1969 the seventh Italian Summer School took place at Igea Marina. Two Hands of the Cause of God, Dr. Adelbert Mlihlschlegel and Jalal Khazeh, three members of the Continental Board of Counsellors, Mrs. D. Ferraby, Mr. L. Henuzet, Dr. E. Blumenthal, as well as a professor of the University of Milan and a young assistant professor from the University of Florence. The 1971 National Baha'i Youth School was held in Pisa in April and was followed by a public conference and in June a Youth Symposium in San Marino was used to plan participation in a continental conference as well as a public meeting. In 1975 group of about 170 attended the National Youth Symposium at Florence. An additional school was held in Vieste as well. The September 1977 Baháʼí summer school was held in Giulianova - one of the speakers was Adib Taherzadeh. He was a speaker at the 1978 school along with others and a special guest Dr. Pagnanelli, director of the information center of the United Nations Organization in Rome, gave a public talk on "The First 30 Years of the United Nations Organization." Eight hundred-fifty people from 19 countries attended the 1983 Italian Baháʼí summer school in the southern city of Cosenza. Special guests at the school were the Hand of the Cause Rúhíyyih Khanum, who was making her first visit to the Italian Baháʼí community. About 120 children attended special classes arranged for them by the Italian National Children's Committee. The Austrian Dawnbreakers toured seven cities in Italy, presenting five concerts, taping two television shows, and appearing at former member of the ensemble, in three schools. Students in a Baháʼí children's class in 1988 in Milan raised money to sponsor a child in Haiti by paying his tuition for a year at the Anís Zunúzí Baháʼí School. About 600 youth from 20 countries gathered for the European Baháʼí Youth Conference in San Marino including some 40 youth Baháʼís from Turkey. Guest speakers included various ministers of government of San Marino and as covered on state television and six newspapers.

=== Flood relief ===
In response to the 1966 Flood of the River Arno in Florence the National Spiritual Assembly of Italy appointed an Aid to Flood Victims Committee during the 1966 national conference on the progress of the religion in November. The members were: Houshyar Achraf, Mohammad Ravanbakhs, Col. Giulio Jacoviello, Sohrab Payment, and Maud Bosio. The first check received for the fund was from the Universal House of Justice. City Hall furnished Letters of introduction to the Aid Centers of the most damaged districts in Florence and Brozzi. Before October 1967 a variety of assistance was provided: seventy-five families visited; fifty-nine families assisted with more than 1,600 garments; forty-eight families given bed linen, towels, etc.; twenty-seven woolen blankets furnished; beds, mattresses, pillows, electric stoves and furniture distributed. The sum of $735 (1967 dollars) was given as emergency help to twenty families.

=== Publications ===
In 1954 a translation of John Esslemont's Baháʼu'lláh and the New Era was published. In 1956 a compilation of Baháʼu'lláh's writings was published as Spigolature dagli scritti. On October 21, 1966, a review of the pamphlet, One God, One Truth, One People, by Dr. Ugo Giachery, appeared in the Italian newspaper Il Secolo in Genoa Italy. It was positively reviewed by critic Nicola Ghiglione. Relazioni Religiose, a press information agency dealing exclusively with religious affairs and worldwide theological developments, announced in its bulletin of February 9, 1967 the legal recognition of the National Spiritual Assembly of the Baháʼís of Italy in an article reviewing the religion entitled "The Religious Bahaʼi Community of Italy Obtains Juridical Recognition". Augusto Robiati published a number of small books and articles in Italian including an introduction to the religion and about the role of assemblies and other works. Two books in particular were Robiati's award-winning Uomo Svegliati (1973) and Gli Otto Veli(1981). The first Italian edition in 1978 of The Dawn-Breakers was made available by the National Spiritual Assembly of the Baháʼís of Italy. Julio Savi began to publish a number of books:Bahíyyih Khánum Ancella di Bahá (1983), and The Eternal Quest for God which was published in 1988 among them. Bausani's essays and articles were gathered together and published in one volume in 1991 by Casa Editrice Baháʼí (Roma) under the title: Saggi sulla Fede Baháʼí(Essays on the Baháʼí Faith). In 1991 a collection of essays about the Baháʼí Faith by Bausani was published. Others of his texts are used in academic religious classes in 2010. A 2001 book I Baha'i profiling the religion has been translated into Italian published through CESNUR (Centro Studi sulle Nuove Religion). Bausani was director of the Italian quarterly magazine Opinioni Baháʼí from its foundation which was published under authority of the national assembly starting in 1977. The National Spiritual Assembly of the Baháʼís of Italy initiated the publication of a special booklet for International Year of the Child containing quotations from the Baháʼí scriptures on the education of children.

=== Socio-economic development projects ===
Since its inception the religion has had involvement in socio-economic development beginning by giving greater freedom to women, promulgating the promotion of female education as a priority concern, and that involvement was given practical expression by creating schools, agricultural coops, and clinics.

The religion entered a new phase of activity when a message of the Universal House of Justice dated 20 October 1983 was released. Baháʼís were urged to seek out ways, compatible with the Baháʼí teachings, in which they could become involved in the social and economic development of the communities in which they lived. Worldwide in 1979 there were 129 officially recognized Baháʼí socio-economic development projects. By 1987, the number of officially recognized development projects had increased to 1482. Italian Association of Baha'i Studies in 1990. Baha'i Association of Socio-Economic Development named after Gianni Ballerio was established in 2003 and operates over forty projects across Regions of Italy.

== Institutional and community development ==
More than forty youth attended the three-day conference in Florence that centered its discussion around specific challenges in Italy to the progress of the religion. Ugo Giachery met with youth and adult Baháʼís in October and November. The first Italian Baháʼí of Mantua was Aida Neva.

In 1966 there were a number of developments. The Italian National Spiritual Assembly was able to register as an incorporated foundation under Italian law. The same year a gathering of Baháʼís on Sardinia was coordinated and a talk given by Livia Pargentino, the first declared Sardinian Baháʼí. In 1966 two islands had their first pioneers- on the island of Capri it was Rouhaughy Fahteazam, and on the island of Lipari it was Teresa Taffa while in Sardinia there was the first Sardinian conversion occurred when Livia Pargentino joined the religion.

The first training institute for promulgating the religion in Italy was conducted by Mildred Mottahehdeh in February 1967. In 1968 a Catholic monk, Padre Marian, mentioned the religion on his television program and read the prayer by ʻAbdu'l-Bahá. Also Maud Basio who aside from all her services (see below) was also mother of Mrs. Firuz Kazemzadeh, died. In 1969 the Italian Baháʼí Publishing Trust was established and the national assembly established cooperative relations with the Italian Esperanto Federation. By September 1970 Alfredo Speranza, a noted pianist who moved to Italy, joined the religion as well as the first citizen of San Marino. In May 1976 a 1,000-word article reviewing the religion was printed in La Stampa in Turin after interviewing the secretary of the national assembly A. Parsa, a member of the national assembly, was invited to start a weekly one-hour broadcast called "Programme Baha'i" on a station in Pisa. Other regular radio broadcasts began in Bologna, Bolzano and Trofarello. Along with informational talks from Baháʼí teachings music was interspersed from various Baha'i musicians like Seals and Crofts, Dizzy Gillespie, England Dan and John Ford Coley as well as Italian artists. In February 1977 coordinated efforts focused the national community on Brescia, Cosenza and Salerno for one week and in Lipari, Messina and Trofarello the second week. At the end of the effort Salerno elected an assembly. The assembly of Trieste rented display case for Baháʼí literature at a bus terminal in Muggia and also awarded trophies for service to humanity. Cosenza was the focus of some effort in August 1977 when traveling teachers visiting the pioneer there. It was decided to show some filmstrips but the living room would not hold the more than 12 people who attended they set up to show the film outside, against the wall of the house. The neighbors were glad to cooperate. The woman downstairs handed chairs from her apartment out the window. Filmstrips like The Baháʼís and the Holy Land and part of the Green Light Expedition about Rúhíyyih Khanum's travels in Bolivia and Peru. A month later the first assembly of Cosenza was elected.

In 1978 a diverse set of events took place in regards to the Baháʼí Faith in Italy. Some one hundred Baháʼís met for a conference on the progress of the religion across Italy Florence in March 1978. All of the national assembly members were able to attend the April 1978 international convention to elect the Universal House of Justice which also served as an opportunity for the dedication of the Seat of the Universal House. The Italian firm Industria dei Marmi Vicentini, one of the largest of Italy at least since the 1990s, produced a brochure covering the dedication and building to acquaint potential customers with the quality of its work in architectural marble. The brochure tells of the history of the religion, the role of the Universal House of Justice, and gives some details of the design of the building itself. The firm points out that its quarries would provide 85,000 cubic feet (2,400 m^{3}) of "Caesar's White" marble similar to that from Penteliko Mountain that was used in The Parthenon which had 46 columns each 31.5 feet (9.6 m) high while the Seat of the Universal House of Justice has 58 columns each 33 feet (10 m) high. The workers were from Chiampo. The Baháʼí Publishing Trust of Italy and the Local Spiritual Assembly of Milan pooled resources to hold a booth at the 56th annual Milan Trade Fair in April. Other booths in Fairs were held in Cagliari and for the first time in Bari. The displays included Baháʼí literature - Milan's had materials in Arabic, English, Esperanto, French, German, Italian, Japanese, Norwegian, Portuguese, Spanish, as well as two books in Braille. A special guest at the Milan booth was the French Baháʼí author, Andre Brugiroux, who presented his film La Terre n'ext qu'un Seul Pays (The Earth is but One Country). The theme of the Baháʼí booths at all the fairs was the International Year of the Child. The Baháʼís in Francavilla al Mare held their first public proclamation event June which was covered by the local newspaper, Il Messaggero Abruzzo. Scandicci saw the first Baháʼí marriage ceremony and a large meeting was held in Verona using a room at the local Museum of Natural Sciences. Two of the nine large inscriptions on the remodeled facade of a Catholic church in Forlì included quotations from The Hidden Words along with Book of Jeremiah, the Talmud, the writings of Confucius, and the words of St. Francis of Assisi. In 1978 the national assembly reported the community had reached 43 assemblies and had sent one pioneer Nigeria, one to Switzerland, two to France. The January 1979 anniversary of the death of the Hand of the Cause of God Dorothy Beecher Baker was commemorated by the Baha'is of Portoferraio, Livorno and Alessandria for the ceremony at Portoferraio's City Hall. Among the guests were Roberto Bandinelli, a retired Harbor Office employee who was the first to arrive at the scene of the crash in 1954, and Domenico Barbieri, who was mayor of Portoferraio at the time.

A 19-member delegation represented the Baháʼí International Community at the Parliamentary Assembly of the Council of Europe in Strasbourg, France. At the 27th Sitting of the 33rd Ordinary Session the Assembly unanimously adopted Resolution No. 768 calling upon the Iranian authorities "to extend to the Baháʼí community the constitutional guarantees with respect to religious, ethnic and philosophic minorities included in the new Iranian Constitution, " and urging the governments of the member states of the Council of Europe to "utilise every possible opportunity including European Community and United Nations channels, with a view to convincing the Iranian Government of the necessity to respect the law and international conventions to which it is a party." The Baha'i representatives, sent to Strasbourg by 16 National Spiritual Assemblies in Europe to support the work of the Baha'i International Community included Giovanni Fava form Italy. The Italian government's representative referred to UN reports drawn up on the situation then available and also during the debate specifically mentioned the treatment of the Baháʼís in Iran. A draft of the resolution was adopted on March 11, 1982. See Persecution of Baháʼís.

In 1983 the Baháʼí community of Italy had achieved its goal of 50 Spiritual Assemblies with the election of the first Assembly at Caserta in the Campania Region. At that time the only Regions of Italy not to have at least one Assembly were Sassari, North Sardinia, and in Campobasso, Molise. In 1985 the Italian Baháʼí community reached 55 assemblies with the first assemblies of Campobasso and San Pietro. Forty Baháʼís from 28 localities joined the Baháʼís of Perugia to celebrate the 25th anniversary of the formation of the SpiritUal Assembly of Perugia. At the event Dr. Giachery told the story of how, as a young wounded soldier, still ignorant of the Baháʼí Faith, he was in Perugia in 1916. A January 1988 episode of a 45-minute program in an Italian television series on "Men and Prophets" was devoted entirely to the religion with an independent introduction by Prof. Sergio Noia, a lecturer in languages and literature at the Catholic University of Milan describing the independent nature of the faith, explained its clear distinction from Islam, and showed that religious fanaticism has been the cause of the persecution of the religion to the present.

In March 1988 Prof. Alessandro Bausani, member of national institutions of the religion in Italy, academic and writer of numerous books, died. Hand of the Cause Dr. Giachery died while on a trip to American Samoa. In 1990 the Baháʼís of Portici had quickly risen to 105 members and elected their first assembly.

=== Sicily ===
Sicily had its first Baháʼí pioneers in 1953 with the arrivals of Emma Rice, and Stanley and Florence Bagley moving to Taormina and Palermo. The first local assembly of Palermo was elected in 1958 - and youth members of the community were contributing their own translations of various Baháʼí materials. By March 1961 the Sicilian Baháʼí community had sent eight pioneers to other areas.

In August 1968 the Universal House of Justice called for a conference to be held in Palermo to commemorate from the movement of Baháʼu'lláh from Gallipoli to the Most Great Prison. This event was compared with the migration of Abraham from Ur of the Chaldees to the region of Aleppo, the journey of Moses towards the Promised Land, the flight into Egypt of Mary and Joseph with the infant Jesus, and the Hijrah of Muhammad. The setting for the observance was chosen, as the religion's first Oceanic Conference, in light of the anniversary on the sea which bore it, as well as important steps in the progress of the religions of Christianity and Islam as well as the Baháʼí Faith (noting ʻAbdu'l-Bahá's journeys to the West across it.) With such themes as a backdrop it was also a purpose of the conference to raise the spirits of Baháʼís, increase the rate of pioneers traveling to goal areas, and the state of funds. The national assembly of Italy undertook the organizing of the conference by appointing Teresa Taffa, Sohrab Payment, and Maud Bosio as coordinators of the conference. Over 2300 Baháʼís from around the world arrived from 67 countries and served as a prelude to the visit to the Holy Land on the occasion of the Centenary of Baháʼu'lláh's arrival in 'Akká on August 31, 1868. The main site of the conference was at the Fiera del Mediterraneo. Provisions were available for simultaneous translation of the conference from English to Italian, Spanish, Persian, German and French. Professor Alessandro Bausani, as Chairman of the National Spiritual Assembly of Italy, welcomed everyone to the conference and noted the attendance of ten Hands of the Cause and all the members of the Continental Board of Counselors were introduced. Speeches reviewed a range of topics across 3 days - the circumstances of Baháʼu'lláh's trip, the cornerstone of the unity of mankind as a core teaching of the religion, the propagation of The Proclamation of Baha'u'llah as a collection of his works written around this anniversary, reports on the status of some of the communities in Europe, North Africa, and the Middle East as well as a summary of the worldwide community, the progress of the then being built Baháʼí House of Worship in Panama, a history of Akká and events in Baháʼu'lláh's lifetime. Giornale di Sicilia, a daily paper of Palermo, ran an article about interviewing Dizzy Gillespie in Bergamo noting his religion as Baháʼí in.

A Sinti gypsy, Vittorio Mayer Custodino, (known as "Spatzo" or "Sparrow") came in contact with the religion while in prison in Sicily. Through him a number of Sicilian Sinti joined the religion by March 1978. In 1989 the first member of the Arbëreshë, Pietro Pandolfini, from Gela, joined the religion. In 1990 some sixty youth gathered in Gela for a conference.

Respecting its regional autonomy and the depth of the Baháʼí community in 1995 the Baháʼís of Sicily elected its own National Assembly. In September 2003 the Baháʼís of Sicily celebrated the golden jubilee of the arrival of the religion there and which in 2003 had eleven assemblies.

=== Sardinia ===
In October 1953 Marie Ciocca moved to Cagliari in Sardinia and was appointed by Shoghi Effendi as a Knight of Baháʼu'lláh - Ciocca was an Italian-American and soon married James Holmlund who had also moved to Sardinia from America. In 1966 Livia Pargentino became the first native Sardinian Baháʼí. In August 1968 Ciocca was buried in the cemetery of Cagliari. In 1968 there was a public meeting in Sardinia which was also the subject of the local newspaper article. In November 1975 the local assembly of Cagliari held a booth at a 10-day fair on Sardinia as well as an observation of United Nations Day. In November 1975 a television talk program called Ore Venti out of Cagliari reviewed the religion. The interviewer opened the program with a reading from Gleanings from the Writings of Baháʼu'lláh. Alessandro Bausani then spoke of the history of the religion and explained Baháʼí administration. Another guest, Manuela Fanti, explained how and why she joined the religion. During the 25-minute interview Bausani stressed the universality of the religion by describing his recent trip to Bolivia. By summer 1976 Baháʼís had been invited to address a number of religious studies classes in Cagliari and Alessandria, hour-long interviews had been granted on two Cagliari radio stations and an assembly was formed in Quartu Sant'Elena. In 1978 the Baháʼís of Cagliari and Quartu Sant'Elena pooled resources to support a booth at the Trade Fair in 1978.

== Modern community ==
In 2002 the University of Bari established a course on ethics and economics, "Ethics and Economy: Towards a New World Order" that is based on Baháʼí teachings and appointed Baháʼí professor and businessman Giuseppe Robiati as its teacher. In 2008 the Baha'i community was hosting about 25 youth groups across Italy with more than 130 participants; three-fourths come from outside the Bahaʼi community. In February 2009 a regional conference for southern Europe was hosted for nearly 1,700 people, 300 of them children and junior youth, and 100-plus from Sicily alone, with Bahaʼi communities from across southern Europe. The conference was held at Abano Terme, just outside Padua. Artist presentations included two talented opera singers from Slovenia and Malta, a pianist from Romania, a Bulgarian folk singer, and a professional guitarist from Croatia, Greece sent a quintet of female singers as well as dancers from Rhodes, Sicilian folk dancers. Simultaneous translation was provided in English, Greek, Italian, and Romanian. Jamshid Varjavandi, the director of the Center for Bahaʼi Studies in Acuto attended. The ʻIrfán Colloquia regularly meet at the Center for Baháʼí Studies: Acuto, Italy since 1995.

=== Demographics ===
The Association of Religion Data Archives (relying mostly on the World Christian Encyclopedia) estimated some 5088 Baháʼís in Italy in 2005. Baháʼí sources claim about 3000 adherents and are present in over 300 locations across Italy.

== See also ==
- Religion in Italy
- History of Italy
