= Baháʼí Faith in New Caledonia =

The Baháʼí Faith in New Caledonia was first mentioned by ʻAbdu'l-Bahá in 1916, though the first Baháʼí arrived in 1952 during a temporary visit because of restrictive policies on English-speaking visitors. In 1961 Jeannette Outhey was the first New Caledonian to join the religion. On the same year, Emma and Georges Wayenece were the first Melanesian couple to accept the Faith of Baha'u'llah. With other converts and pioneers, they elected the first Baháʼí Local Spiritual Assembly of Nouméa in 1962. The Baháʼí National Spiritual Assembly of New Caledonia was elected in 1977. Multiplying its involvements through to today, the 2001 population was reported at 1,070. The Association of Religion Data Archives (relying on World Christian Encyclopedia) estimated some 955 Baháʼís in 2005.

== First mention ==
The first mention of New Caledonia in Baháʼí literature is in a series of letters, or tablets, to the followers of the religion in the United States in 1916–1917 by ʻAbdu'l-Bahá, then head of the religion, asking the followers of the religion to travel to other countries; these letters were compiled together in the book titled Tablets of the Divine Plan. The seventh of the tablets was the first to mention several island nations in the Pacific Ocean. Written on 11 April 1916, it was delayed in being presented in the United States until 1919 – after the end of World War I and the Spanish flu. The seventh tablet was translated and presented by Mirza Ahmad Sohrab on 4 April 1919, and published in Star of the West magazine on 12 December 1919.

A party speaking their languages, severed, holy, sanctified and filled with the love of God, must turn their faces to and travel through the three great island groups of the Pacific Ocean—Polynesia, Micronesia and Melanesia, and the islands attached to these groups, such as New Guinea, Borneo, Java, Sumatra, Philippine Islands, Solomon Islands, Fiji Islands, New Hebrides, Loyalty Islands, New Caledonia, Bismarck Archipelago, Ceram, Celebes, Friendly Islands, Samoa Islands, Society Islands, Caroline Islands, Low Archipelago, Marquesas, Hawaiian Islands, Gilbert Islands, Moluccas, Marshall Islands, Timor and the other islands. With hearts overflowing with the love of God, with tongues commemorating the mention of God, with eyes turned to the Kingdom of God, they must deliver the glad tidings of the manifestation of the Lord of Hosts to all the people.

== Early phase ==
=== Governmental policies in the area ===
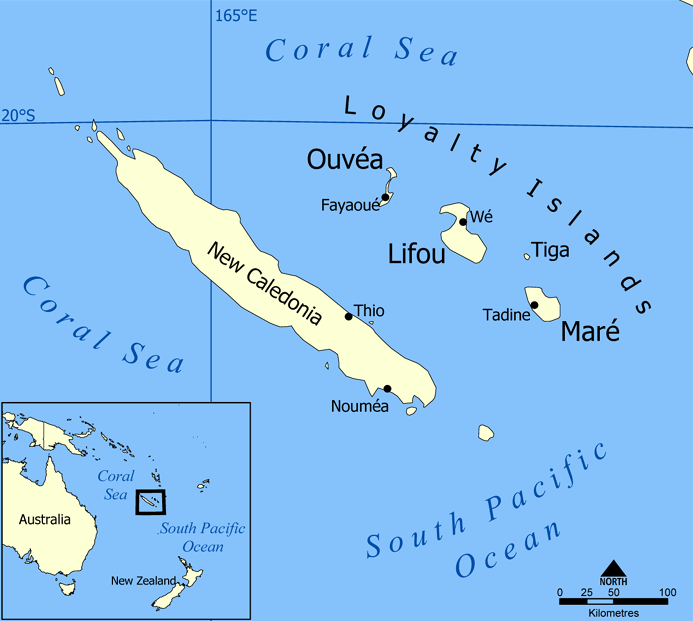

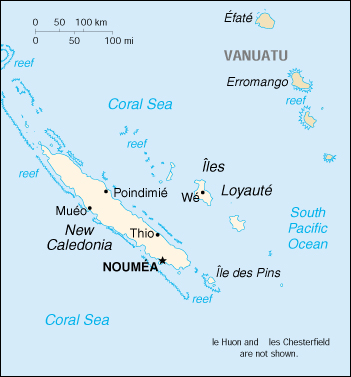
New Caledonia map from CIA World Factbook

As a special member of the former Second French colonial empire today's New Caledonia has a Sui generis relationship with France. The French government oversight of the islands of French Polynesia included an immigration policy of denying non-French speakers/citizens long-term residency in French Overseas Territories. English speaking Australians Baháʼís were thus ineligible for permanent residency. Consequently, Australian Baháʼí pioneers were itinerant rather than permanent, and frequently returned to Australia or travelled between colonies when their visas expired. Access to the Loyalty Islands was even more restrictive as they were designated off-limits to all Europeans, including French citizens.

=== Pioneers and converts ===
Shoghi Effendi, head of the religion after the death of ʻAbdu'l-Bahá, communicated about New Caledonia in several letters: 3 June 1952, 30 April 1953, 7 May 1953, 31 December 1954, 24 January 1956, 3 May 1956 and 15 February 1957, before he died in November 1957. Overall there was poor growth of the Baháʼí community in the French Overseas Territories in the period following World War II including New Caledonia which contrasted strongly with other areas of the Pacific (see, for example, Baháʼí Faith in Vietnam).

In this atmosphere of restricted visits, the first pioneer to reach New Caledonia was Australia's Margaret Rowling in early 1952 followed closely by Mariette Bolton in February the same year. While visiting Nouméa, Bolton went to Bourail and Voh communes. Francois Feminier is mentioned as a convert by July 1952 but may not have been a resident. In January 1955 Rowling described her experiences in New Caledonia in talks at Yerrinbool Baháʼí School in Australia. Daniel Haumont became a Baháʼí in the Society Islands in early 1955, and travelled to the Loyalty Islands in October 1955 and was named a Knight of Baháʼu'lláh.

A Persian family, the Sohailis, denied entrance to Australia because of Australia's White Australia policy was able to pioneer to New Caledonia in 1955. In 1958 representatives from the Baháʼí community of New Caledonia attended the 1958 intercontinental conference held in Sydney Australia. By 1959 translations in the Ajië language (also called Houailou) were available.

In 1961 the first citizens of New Caledonia converted to the religion. Perhaps the first resident Baháʼí was Jeannette Outhey. She accepted the religion in Thio on the north side of the island on 10 June 1961. In the same year the first people from the Loyalty Islands converted to the religion – they were a husband and wife who joined the religion in Nouméa on the south side of the main island but whose home was on Maré Island. By the end of 1961 there were enough Baháʼís to form a Local Spiritual Assembly in Nouméa with a smaller community in Thio. Outhey took part actively in 1961 in the election of the first Local Spiritual Assembly of Nouméa and served on that body for nineteen consecutive years before serving in other capacities.

In 1962 Hand of the Cause Collis Featherstone travelled between 3 October and 12 November with an itinerary that included Nouméa among many stops. A regional National Spiritual Assembly had been elected in 1959 to whose annual convention a delegate from the Nouméa spiritual assembly attended first in 1963. Jean Sevin, who was designated a Knight of Baháʼu'lláh to the Tuamotu Archipelago region, was the only French Baháʼí to pioneer in the Pacific during the Ten Year Crusade. In 1968, at the request of the Universal House of Justice, Sevin moved to New Caledonia, settling in Nouméa.

== National Spiritual Assembly ==
In 1964 the regional national assembly was divided into separate regional national assemblies with one based in Honiara, serving the South West Pacific Ocean (Solomon Islands, New Caledonia, Loyalty Is, New Hebrides). Later in 1971, the Solomon Islands formed their own National Assembly and the seat of the National Spiritual Assembly (NSA) of the South West Pacific Ocean was transferred from Honiara in the Solomon Islands to Nouméa. The same year pioneers for Tuamotus were identified. The NSA was composed of Baháʼís from New Hebrides, New Caledonia and the Loyalty Islands. In 1977, the National Spiritual Assembly of New Caledonia and Loyalty Islands was elected.

== Multiplying interests and growth ==
Since its inception the religion has had involvement in socio-economic development beginning by giving greater freedom to women, promulgating the promotion of female education as a priority concern, and that involvement was given practical expression by creating schools, agricultural coops, and clinics. In 1975 the assembly of Maré hosted a Women's Congress and the community of Nouméa was visited by a Baha'í traveler who shared stories of his father meeting Baháʼu'lláh, the founder of the religion. The religion entered a new phase of activity when a message of the Universal House of Justice dated 20 October 1983 was released. Baháʼís were urged to seek out ways, compatible with the Baháʼí teachings, in which they could become involved in the social and economic development of the communities in which they lived. Worldwide in 1979 there were 129 officially recognized Baháʼí socio-economic development projects. By 1987, the number of officially recognized development projects had increased to 1482. The Baháʼí community in New Caledonia has participated in a number of events in New Caledonia. In 1988, and then again 1991, the Baháʼí International Community, who were meeting in New Caledonia, offered statements at the Secretariat of the Pacific Community; the statements summarized Baháʼí projects across the Pacific basin by the Baháʼís on projects related to initiatives of the United Nations (in this case Health, Education, and the Role of Women and Health and Nutrition).

In 1999, New Caledonian Baháʼí were attendees of "Partnerships for the Next Millennium" international conference by the Office for the Advancement of Women of the Baháʼí community of Australia, and then in 2000 the New Caledonia Baháʼí National Women's Association was established and based in Anse Vata.

In 2005, for the 80th anniversary of the Baháʼí Faith, in Fiji the New Caledonian Baháʼí community contributed a Cook Pine in memory of those Baháʼís who have been killed in Iran (see Persecution of Baháʼís). In 2007 representatives from New Caledonia National Spiritual Assembly addressed the delegates to the national convention for the election of the national spiritual assembly of the Baháʼís of New Zealand on the occasion of their 50th anniversary.

=== Growth ===
Growth by conversion had been sporadic but accelerating by the end of the 1970s. In the 1970s a number of gatherings of Baháʼís resulted in teams of people who cooperated in efforts to bring the religion to the attention of people in New Caledonia. In one nine-week period in early 1977 29 people converted to the religion; 12 being from the town of Thio alone, and three more are from the Loyalty Islands. In 1978 Meherangiz Munsiff, a Baháʼí from Great Britain, attracted publicity. In Nouméa, Munsiff participated in a one and one-half-hour television broadcast mentioning Baháʼí teachings on the role of women which was transmitted to many places in the South Pacific. In 1979 Baháʼís sources state there were seven assemblies and 24 additional localities with at least one Baháʼí, plus six assemblies and 24 localities of at least one Baháʼí in the Loyalty Islands.

In the 1980s larger group dynamics began to come into play. In 1982 Baháʼís in the Loyalty Islands from Maré Island built a Baháʼí center for the Baháʼís of Nakéty of Canala province of the main island, in a traditional style – at the dedication some 100 non-Baháʼís and village elders were moved by the act of service from one community to another. In 1986 tribal chiefs accepted news of the religion with enthusiasm when they understood that progressive revelation from a Baháʼí point of view neither negated nor condemned previous religions, and indeed their own tribal faith predicted the coming of a great "Peacemaker."

In 1990 in classes by Helen Perkins, a Baháʼí from Australia, aspects of the religion were emphasized as well as giving a chance to respond to questions of Baháʼís. She also spoke at a large gathering.

== Demographics ==
A 2001 estimate for the number of Baháʼís in the country was listed at 0.50% of the national population or 1,070 individuals with an annual growth rate of +2.1% by Operation World. The Association of Religion Data Archives (relying on World Christian Encyclopedia) estimated some 880 Baháʼís in 2005. The Association of Religion Data Archives (relying on World Christian Encyclopedia) estimated some 955 Baháʼís in 2005.

== See also ==
- History of New Caledonia
