= Margaret Dixson =

Early follower of the Bahá'í Faith in Australia

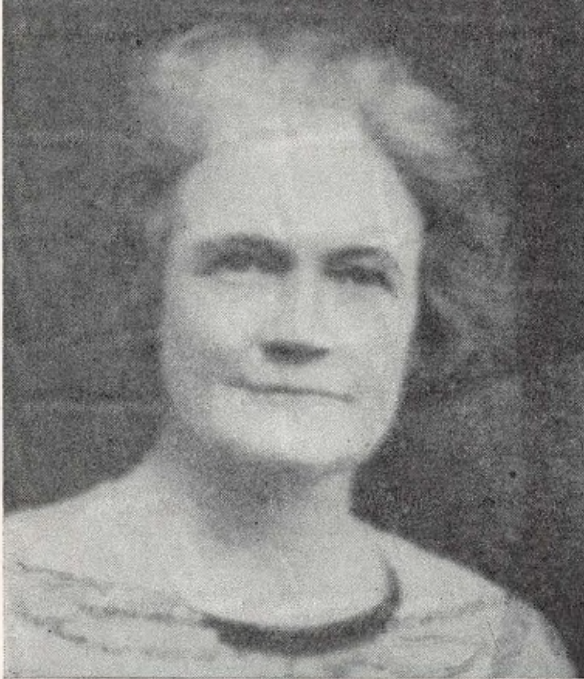
- Born: Margaret Bertha Dixson; 11 July 1877
- Died: 25 June 1940 (aged 62); Melbourne, Victoria, Australia
- Occupation: religious leader
- Known for: Significant role in the establishment of Baháʼí Faith in Australia

Margaret Bertha Dixson (née Shann) (11 July 1877 – 25 June 1940) was an early Australian follower of the Bahá'í Faith in Melbourne, Victoria. She played a significant role in the establishment of the Bahá'í Faith in Australia. Dixson was instrumental in forming and hosting the first Local Spiritual Assembly of the Australian Bahá'í community in Melbourne in 1923 and as the Secretary effectively introduced Bahá'í administration to Australia. Dixson was also the Secretary of the Sydney Local Assembly from 1925 to 1927.

== Early life and intellectual interests ==
Dixson grew up in rural Victoria and had a conventional early education. She was originally from an Anglican family, and her father was a devout Christian. Her parents Frank and Frances Shann were pastoralists. They separated and then divorced, causing the family of four siblings to be split between the two parents. Dixson and her sister Elizabeth stayed with her mother, and the brothers Edward and Frank stayed with their father. Dixson worked as a governess on a rural property, and at the age of nineteen married her employer’s brother Walter Dixson, who was a moderately successful wheat farmer. They had three children: Doris, John and Molly. Although not having the opportunity to pursue higher education or gain qualifications, Dixson had profound intellectual interests, and specifically, she studied numerology, astrology and Esperanto. In 1916, Dixson’s husband died from a cerebral haemorrhage resulting from a farm accident, and the family left the farm and moved to Melbourne.

== Introduction to the Bahá'í Faith ==
Upon moving to Melbourne, as a widow and sole parent, Dixson struggled financially and had periods of ill health. She pursued her intellectual interests, and visited the New Civilisation Centre in Melbourne regularly. The Centre was established by Dr Julia Seton Sears from the United States, founder of the New Thought movement in North America. Dixson taught numerology classes at the New Civilisation Centre in Melbourne, where in November 1923 she was introduced to Bahá’í teachings by John Hyde and Clara Dunn, who had first introduced the Bahá’í Faith to Sydney in April 1922. Dixon was therefore one of Australia’s earliest Bahá’ís.

== Service to the Australian Bahá'í Community ==
On 9 December 1923, seventeen Bahá'ís gathered at the residence of Margaret Dixson in South Yarra, to form the first Local Assembly of the Australian Bahá'í community. Dixson also assisted with the logistics of preparing for the visit of inspiring Bahá'í speaker and traveller Martha Root from the United States, who visited Melbourne in July 1924. Dixson formed a close friendship with Clara Dunn and Dixson and her children moved to Sydney in November 1925, staying with the Dunns in Randwick, to assist Clara Dunn with her recovery when she became ill.^{[5]} Dixson assisted as Secretary of the Sydney Spiritual Assembly which was formed and hosted by the Dunns when she arrived.

Dixson returned to Melbourne in August 1927, at a time that the Bahá'í membership in Melbourne was declining. The Melbourne Spiritual Assembly was re-formed in 1931, inspired by the visit of Keith Ransom-Kehler, another inspiring Bahá'í speaker and traveller from the United States. In May 1934 Dixson travelled to Sydney for the formation of the National Spiritual Assembly of the Bahá'ís of Australia and New Zealand. From 1934 to 1940 Dixson kept notes about the Melbourne Bahá'í community in an acclaimed historical document known as “The Diary of a Melbourne Bahá'í”. Dixson suffered a series of debilitating illness during these years; and died on 25 June 1940 at the age of sixty-two. She was buried at the Springvale Botanical Cemetery on 26 June 1940. The service was conducted by Unitarian minister Rev. Bottomly who had attended Martha Root's Melbourne lectures.

Dixson is the grandmother of Miriam Dixson, Australian social historian and the author of The Real Matilda: Woman and Identity in Australia 1788 to 1975.

== Selected publications ==
- Dixson, Margaret (1927) “The Four Causes. A Bahá’í Story for Children”. Herald of the South (Australian and New Zealand Bahá’í publication). April–May 1927. pp. 11–13.
- Dixson, Margaret (1928) “An Australian Pilgrimage to the Australian Pilgrim House”. Herald of the South. (Australian and New Zealand Bahá’í publication). June–July 1928, pp. 8–13.
