= Baháʼí Faith in Vietnam =

The introduction of the Baháʼí Faith in Vietnam first occurred in the 1920s, not long after French Indochina was mentioned by ʻAbdu'l-Bahá as a potential destination for Baháʼí teachers. After a number of brief visits from travelling teachers throughout the first half of the 20th century, the first Baháʼí group in Vietnam was established in Saigon in 1954, with the arrival of Shirin Fozdar, a Baháʼí teacher from India. The 1950s and 1960s were marked by periods of rapid growth, mainly in South Vietnam; despite the ongoing war affecting the country, the Baháʼí population surged to around 200,000 adherents by 1975. After the end of the war, Vietnam was reunified under a communist government, who proscribed the practice of the religion from 1975 to 1992, leading to a sharp drop in community numbers. Relations with the government gradually improved, however, and in 2007 the Baháʼí Faith was officially registered, followed by its full legal recognition a year later. As of 2012, it was reported that the Baháʼí community in Vietnam comprised about 8,000 followers.

== French Indochina (pre-1954) ==
=== ʻAbdu'l-Bahá's Tablets of the Divine Plan ===
The earliest association of Vietnam with the Baháʼí Faith was a brief mention of French Indochina—of which the country was then a part—as a destination for Baháʼí teachers in ʻAbdu'l-Bahá's Tablets of the Divine Plan. The specific tablet in question was written on 11 April 1916, but was delayed in being presented in the United States until 1919, after the end of World War I and the Spanish flu. These tablets were translated and presented by Mirza Ahmad Sohrab on 4 April 1919, and published in Star of the West magazine on 12 December 1919.

"The moment this divine Message is carried forward by the American believers from the shores of America and is propagated through the continents of Europe, of Asia, of Africa and of Australasia, and as far as the islands of the Pacific, this community will find itself securely established upon the throne of an everlasting dominion..., if some teachers go to other islands and other parts, such as the continent of Australia, New Zealand, Tasmania, also to Japan, Asiatic Russia, Korea, French Indochina, Siam, Straits Settlements, India, Ceylon and Afghanistan, most great results will be forthcoming."

ʻAbdu'l-Bahá had at one time seriously considered a voyage to India and Indochina, as reported by Shoghi Effendi in 1919, although whether such a voyage would have included the territory that would become known as Vietnam is not known.

=== Early contact ===
The first Baháʼí to visit Vietnam is likely to have been Hippolyte Dreyfus-Barney, one of the first Baháʼís of France, who undertook a number of travels around the globe at the request of ʻAbdu'l-Bahá. After an initial planned visit was aborted in 1914 due to the outbreak of World War I, Dreyfus-Barney arrived in what was then French Indochina in 1920, visiting Saigon and Hanoi. Four years later in May 1924, prominent Baháʼí travelling teacher Martha Root paid a week-long visit to Saigon. During her stay, she promoted the message and principles of the religion to a number of newspapers, making friends with one Madame Boeuf, editor of an English section in "L'Information de l'Extrême Orient". Boeuf was sympathetic to the principles of the Baháʼí religion, and published a number of favorable French-language articles. Several other newspapers also printed articles describing Baháʼí principles, in French, Chinese and Vietnamese. A public lecture was arranged with the help of the Governor, who, when approached, "himself telephoned the President of the largest school" to communicate his approval. Besides these initiatives, Root made calls to nineteen schools, societies and individuals in Saigon.

In 1951, the National Spiritual Assembly of the Baháʼís of India, Pakistan and Burma adopted the goal of sending pioneers to a number of cities throughout Africa and Southeast Asia, including Saigon, in response to the summons of Shoghi Effendi, then head of the Baháʼí Faith. In a letter to an individual in September of that year, Effendi reported that there were Baháʼís in Indochina at that time, although their settlement seems to have been short-lived; a March 1952 report stated that Indochina remained unopened to the Baha'i Faith.

== South Vietnam (1954–1975) ==
Following nearly a decade of war between colonial France and the communist Viet Minh, which ended in a decisive French defeat at the Battle of Dien Bien Phu, both sides met at the Geneva Conference on 21 July 1954. A provisional division of Vietnam was made at the 17th parallel, creating the Democratic Republic of Vietnam in the north and the State of Vietnam (later the Republic of Vietnam) in the south. Much of the development of the Baháʼí Faith during the following period took place in South Vietnam; the first Baháʼí groups in the north would not be established until 1992, long after the country's reunification.

=== Establishment and early growth (1954–1963) ===
In February 1954, Shirin Fozdar, a Baháʼí from India who had been a member of the National Spiritual Assembly there, went to Saigon to establish the religion in Indochina. On 15 March, she gave a public introduction to the Baha'i Faith in a lecture at the Norodom theatre, which was given significant coverage in the Vietnamese press. During this time, Pham Huu Chu, a professor living in Saigon, became the first Vietnamese Baháʼí. Jamshed and Parvati Fozdar, members of Fozdar's family, arrived to take her place in the summer, settling into an apartment at 88 Bonard Boulevard (now Le Loi Boulevard). By the following year, there were enough Baháʼís in Saigon to elect the country's first Local Spiritual Assembly there, on 21 April 1955. The Assembly was officially recognized by the government of South Vietnam on 20 September. Promotion of the religion in Central Vietnam led to the establishment of Vietnam's second Spiritual Assembly in the village of Trừng Giang, Quảng Nam province, in April 1957. Eight more Spiritual Assemblies were established in 1958, bringing the total to ten. Of these, most were in Central Vietnam, including those of Da Nang and Quang Ngai. Also established in that year was the Baháʼí community of Phuoc Long, where the first Baháʼí school of South Vietnam was established; several other schools were established in Central Vietnam.

In 1958 Tuskegee Airman Dempsey Morgan and his wife Adrienne, both Baháʼís, came to Vietnam, and over succeeding years helped establish administrative procedures among the Local Spiritual Assemblies of Vietnam. During their stay in Vietnam, the Morgans also identified Baháʼu'lláh, the founder of the Baháʼís Faith, with the Maitreya Buddha, who in the Buddhist tradition is the successor to Gautama Buddha and who is to appear on Earth, achieve complete enlightenment, and teach the pure dharma. During this period of growth a number of Buddhist monks also become Baha'is. The Morgan family left Vietnam for Thailand in 1959, staying for two years before continuing to Phnom Penh. They were able to visit Saigon when Rúhíyyih Khanum visited in 1961 and were able to move back to Saigon before the end of the year. There was also a local newsletter the Baháʼí News in publication by then.

From 1957 to 1963 the Baháʼí community in South Vietnam had more than tripled (including among the Koho, Thổ, Annamese, and Cham peoples) and several schools were established. In 1957 the Baháʼí marriage certificate was recognized in Vietnam. In 1962 16 Baháʼí Local Spiritual Assemblies formed, and by 1963 there were more than 40 (and perhaps over 100) Spiritual Assemblies in South Vietnam. By 1963 there were also 6 local Baháʼí Centers or Haziratu'l-Quds, including in Saigon and Da Nang, and more lands had been bought for future centers. As the number of Baháʼí Local Spiritual Assemblies increased, the National Spiritual Assembly of the Baháʼís of Vietnam was established in 1964. One report estimated over 20,000 Baháʼís nationwide by mid-1964, giving it the "third largest membership among the major religions" in South Vietnam at that time.

Although the Baháʼí community held a generally positive relationship with the government of Ngô Đình Diệm, there is evidence of sporadic opposition at different levels during this period. One account describes government harassment of the Vietnamese Baháʼís around 1958–59, including the imprisonment of the entire Spiritual Assembly of Saigon. On 21 April 1963, Bui Van Luong, then Diệm's Interior Minister, formally prohibited Baháʼís from pursuing "any religious activities in Central Vietnam and the mountainous provinces." Seven months later, the Diệm government was overthrown, and the prohibition of Baháʼí activities was annulled. An account reported in a Swiss Baháʼí newsletter in February 1964 claimed that Baháʼís in Vietnam had been subject to harassment for over seven years leading up to Diệm's ouster.

=== Post-Diệm era (1963–1975) ===
As the Vietnam War continued, there were a number of American Baháʼís who were stationed in Vietnam, but following the Baháʼí teaching of the sacredness of all life and of obedience to one's government, Baháʼís would request to avoid being placed in a position to take the life of another, and thus American Baháʼís served as clerks and medics as non-combatants. By April 1973, 687 Local Spiritual Assemblies had been formed, and Baháʼís could be found in 1,685 localities. By 1975, there were an estimated 200,000 Baháʼís in South Vietnam, and the Baháʼí community and its institutions were still experiencing growth.

== Communist Vietnam (post-1975) ==
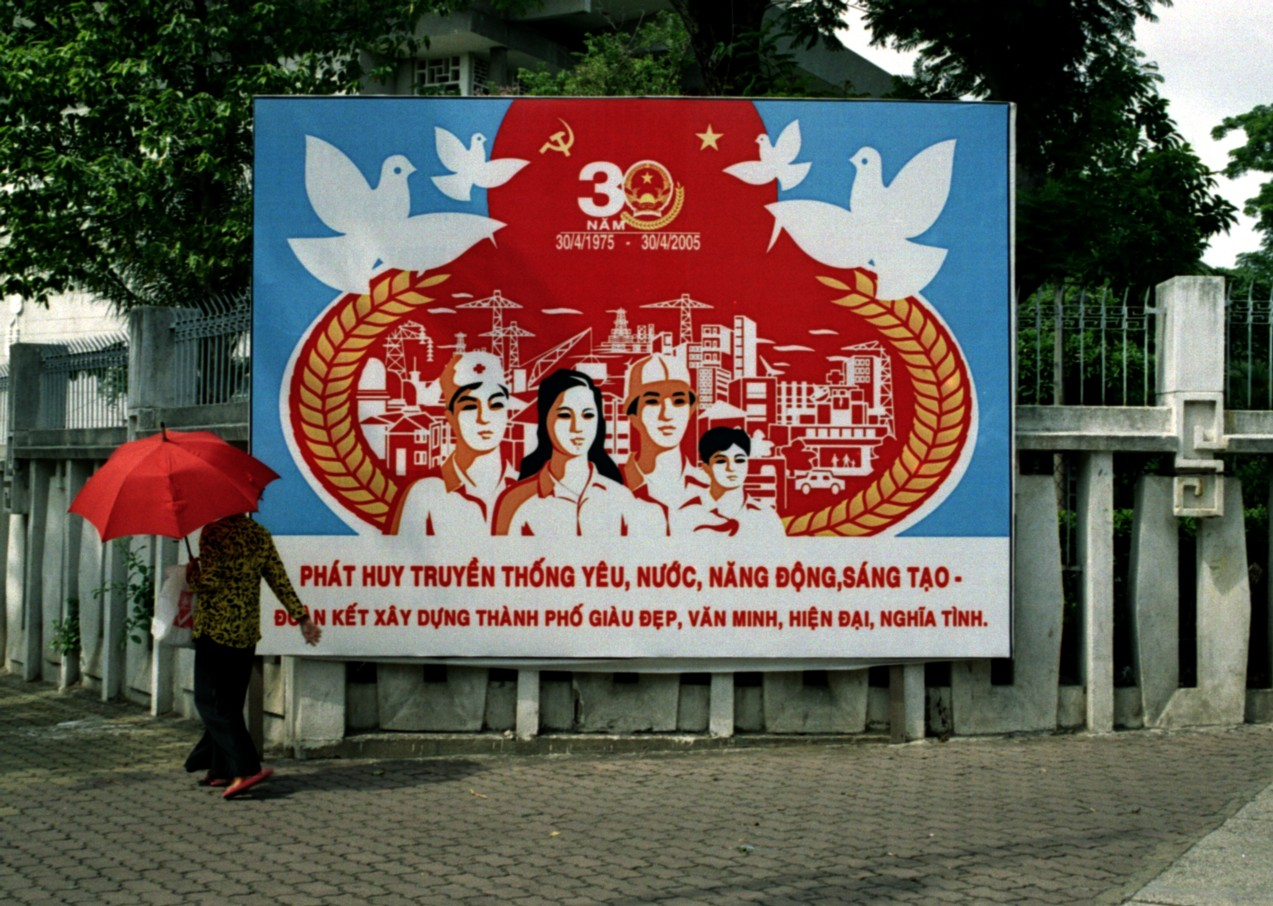
A billboard commemorates the 30th anniversary of the reunification of Vietnam.

In the chaos following the Fall of Saigon on 30 April 1975, the Baháʼí community was severely limited logistically. Contact had already been lost with members in outlying areas, and the national convention scheduled for that time was cancelled; the National Spiritual Assembly was instead elected via mailed-in ballots. In a 1978 report, the Universal House of Justice noted that

"In the latter part of the period under review [1973-1976] circumstances beyond the control of the Baháʼís have hindered the completion of the goals. An administrative committee has been appointed to function on behalf of the National Spiritual Assembly.

For a time, the incoming communist government seemed to tolerate Baháʼí activities; Baháʼís in the newly renamed Ho Chi Minh City (previously Saigon) were allowed to hold a commemoration of the Martyrdom of the Báb in July 1976, and following the setbacks of the previous years, a meeting was held the following year to elect a National Spiritual Assembly.

=== Official proscription ===
Beginning in 1978, open practice of the Baháʼí Faith in Vietnam was officially proscribed. Baháʼís were forbidden to meet or to practice their religion, and Baháʼí properties throughout the country were closed or confiscated. Two members of the National Spiritual Assembly who were present when the national headquarters in Ho Chi Minh City was confiscated were arrested and sent to reeducation camps. In a message sent a year later, the Universal House of Justice reported that Vietnam was among "those countries where the Baháʼí Administration cannot operate or has had to be disbanded". Community numbers dropped sharply during this time as thousands of Baháʼís fled the country, arriving as refugees in the United States and other countries, where efforts were made to contact and integrate them into local Baháʼí communities. Baháʼís in a number of countries throughout the world began sending support to those Baháʼís who remained in Vietnam, regularly sending parcels of medicine, clothes and other necessities; some were able to visit the country and meet with Baháʼís personally. The Baháʼís who remained in Vietnam made appeals to the government requesting the permission to practice their religion and the return of confiscated properties, although progress was limited. At the same time, appeals for the release of Baháʼí prisoners continued, through the Baháʼí International Community and a number of governments and independent agencies. In March 1986, a copy of the Universal House of Justice's statement, The Promise of World Peace, was delivered by a messenger to Mr. Bui Xuan Nhat, the Permanent Representative of Vietnam to the United Nations.

The 1990s and early 2000s saw conditions improve gradually. In 1990, H. Collis Featherstone, a Hand of the Cause, visited Vietnam, focusing his efforts on "reinvigorating" the Baháʼís there. Beginning in 1992, Baháʼís were allowed to meet in unofficial meeting halls to practice their religion quietly, and the first Baháʼí group was established in Hanoi. In 1996, the Universal House of Justice sent a message to Baháʼís in a number of Southeast Asian countries, particularly calling "the sorely tried, steadfast and devoted friends" in Vietnam to demonstrate to the authorities and to their leaders that "Baháʼís, obedient and loyal to their governments, desire but the prosperity of their nations and the upliftment of their peoples."

In 2000, Baháʼís in Da Nang were reportedly unable to obtain approval of an application for registration of official religious activities, and in 2001, the Vietnamese government reportedly turned down an attempt by the national Baháʼí community to register its activities because they "had not yet met the administrative criteria for registration." The difficulties encountered by the Baháʼí community were far from unique. While Vietnam had ratified the International Covenant on Civil and Political Rights(ICCPR) which has provisions for religious freedom (Article 18), and its own Constitution upholds religious freedom, the U.S. State Department reported in its 2001 International Religious Freedom Report that the Vietnamese government "continued to restrict" certain organized activities of religious groups, noting that "many of these restrictive powers lie principally with provincial or city people's committees, and local treatment of religious persons varied widely."

=== End of proscription and recent developments ===
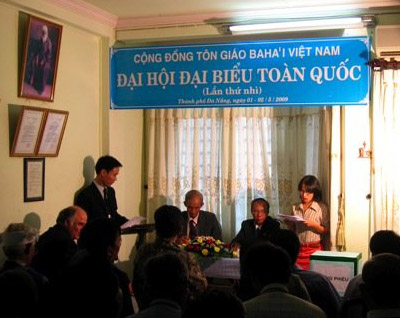
Vietnamese Baháʼís elect their National Spiritual Assembly in Danang, in 2009.

With time, the fortunes of the Vietnamese Baháʼí community continued to improve. Baháʼís in Ho Chi Minh City were allowed to hold a quiet ceremony in May 2004 to mark the 50th anniversary of the establishment of the Baha'i Faith in the country. By 2006, Baháʼí community leaders reported having "good relations with authorities", and that the Baháʼís "appeared to be able to practice their faith without significant harassment." In November of that year, the US State Department reported that restrictions were being eased. Finally, after many years of progress, the Baháʼí community was officially registered in early 2007, receiving a certificate of operation from the governmental Committee for Religious Affairs. Following a year-long probationary period, its nine-member National Spiritual Assembly was elected and its charter adopted on 21 March 2008, at a national congress in Ho Chi Minh City coinciding with the Baháʼí holy day of Naw-Rúz. The event was attended by over 250 delegates and visitors. The National Spiritual Assembly received its certificate of national recognition in July 2008, setting the stage for Local Spiritual Assemblies to be registered as well.

With previous restrictions relaxed, the Vietnamese Baháʼí Community has continued to achieve marked progress, returning to a normal pace of activities and showing signs of growth in size, in freedom, and in institutional capacity. Soon after their community's recognition, Vietnamese Baháʼís were granted permission to attend a major regional conference in Battambang, Cambodia, attended by over 2,000 of their co-religionists from Cambodia, Laos and Thailand. National conventions, held annually in various regions, continue to gather delegates and observers in the hundreds for the election of the National Spiritual Assembly. The fourth national convention, held in April 2011 in the southern city of Phan Thiet, gathered more than 300 Baháʼí members. The Vietnamese government also allowed members from other nations in the region, including representatives from the Baháʼí Advisory Board for Asia and its Board of Trustees for Southeast Asia, to join the event and actively participate for the first time. In May 2012, government officials granted 20 Baháʼís permission to participate in their first collective pilgrimage to the Baháʼí World Center in Haifa, Israel. The nine-day pilgrimage allowed them to visit religious shrines and meet with fellow believers. In August of the same year, the Baháʼís of Hanoi celebrated the 20th anniversary of the religion's establishment in that city with a day-long public celebration, attended by nearly 100 followers from the northern area of the country, 20 foreign Baháʼís representing countries in the region, and government officials. In May 2013, Vietnamese Baháʼís were able to send delegates to represent their country at the 11th International Baháʼí Convention in Haifa, where they participated in the election of the Universal House of Justice. Later in the same year, a number of Vietnamese Baháʼí youth joined their counterparts in Cambodia at a youth conference in Battambang.

Although the 2005 World Christian Database estimated the Baháʼí population of Vietnam well above 300,000, the U.S. State Department estimated the Baháʼí population at around 8,000 in 2012. Regardless, the 2015 estimate from the World Religion Database, the direct successor to the World Christian Database, was of 413,000 Baháʼís.

== See also ==
- Baháʼí Faith by country
- Religion in Vietnam
- List of ethnic groups in Vietnam

== Notes and references ==
Notes

References

- Lược Sử Tôn Giáo Baha'i Tại Việt Nam: 50 Năm - Một Chặng Đường, 1954-2004 [The History of the Baha'i Faith in Vietnam: 50 Years - One Way, 1954-2004] (in Vietnamese). Baha'i Community of Vietnam. 2004. p. 76.
- Lê Lộc (1972). Baha'i Là Gì? [What Is Baha'i?] (in Vietnamese). National Spiritual Assembly of the Baha'is of Vietnam. p. 248.
- Nguyen, Phi-Vân (2018). "A Secular State for a Religious Nation: The Republic of Vietnam and Religious Nationalism, 1946–1963". The Journal of Asian Studies. 77 (3): 741–771.
