= Elizabeth Hindson =

Indigenous Australian and member of Bahá'í Faith

- Born: Elizabeth Anderson; 15 May 1933 (age 93); Queensland
- Occupation: religious leader
- Known for: Indigenous Australian who has served the Bahá'í Faith in Australia for more than 70 years

Elizabeth Hindson (née Anderson) (born 15 May 1933), originally from rural Queensland, is the first Indigenous Australian elected to serve as a member of the national governing body of the Bahá'í Faith in Australia, known as the National Spiritual Assembly of the Bahá'ís of Australia. She has been actively serving the Bahá'í Faith for more than 70 years.

== Early life and education ==
Elizabeth Hindson was known as Betty Anderson in her early years. As a child, she was raised by her grandparents on a cattle station in Queensland. Hindson's first 14 years were spent in the countryside in the Queensland South Burnett area, and then in a small community supported by timber and forestry industries near Kilcoy. Hindson was made aware of her colour, and experienced discrimination for the first time on the first day of primary school.

Hindson later moved to Brisbane where she qualified as a social worker. Professionally, she worked for most of her career in senior roles for the Department of Aboriginal and Islander Affairs with the Queensland Government.

== Roles with the Bahá'í Faith ==
Hindson was the first Indigenous Australian to serve on the national governing body of the Bahá'ís of Australia. She was elected as a member of the National Spiritual Assembly of the Bahá'ís of Australia in 1968, and has served the Bahá'í community in various capacities since that time.

As a young Bahá'í, Hindson (then known as Betty Anderson) was actively involved in advancing the cause of the Faith in Australia. In 1952, a Bahá'í Youth Committee was formed for Brisbane, and she served as the inaugural secretary.

Hindson was referenced in a letter written on behalf of Shoghi Effendi, the Guardian of the Faith, on 30 April 1952: ... “the beloved Guardian has instructed me to answer you on his behalf. He was delighted to hear that Betty Anderson is not only such a devoted and active Bahá’í youth, but that she has aboriginal blood. He hopes that she will be instrumental, with your help, and that of the other believers, in carrying the Message to her relatives. It is only right that the people who were the original inhabitants of Australia should receive the Teachings of Bahá’u’lláh, and we cannot doubt that when they embrace them, it will have a great effect, not only on their characters, but on their position in relation to the life of their country.”

In September 1961, Hindson was present as a participant for the dedication of the Bahá'í Temple in Sydney. Hindson was part of a delegation of 42 Bahá'ís from Australia who attended the First Bahá'í World Congress in London from 28 April to 2 May 1963, called to announce and present the election of the first Universal House of Justice.

Hindson travelled extensively throughout Australia and New Zealand as a teacher of the Bahá'í Faith.

Hindson was a contributor to Indigenous Peoples: In the Wake of Mabo, a publication in 1997 which is a collection of papers contributing to the debate on human rights issues affecting Aboriginal and Torres Strait Islander people in Australia.

== Selected publications ==
- Hindson, Elizabeth (1997) In Kamal Puri (ed.) Indigenous Peoples: in the Wake of Mabo. National Bahá'í Studies Conference (12th: University of Queensland, Brisbane, Qld) Mona Vale, NSW, Australia: Bahá'í Publications Australia for the Association for Bahá'í Studies Australia. pp. 88–100. ISBN 9780909991890
- Sheehan, Mary; Schonfeld, Cynthia; Hindson, Elizabeth; Ballard, Rod (1995), Alcohol education in an Indigenous community school
- Sheehan, Mary & Ballard, Rod & Schonfeld, Cynthia & Hindson, Elizabeth (1992), Attitudes towards a community developed video-based alcohol education program : final report. https://worldcat.org/oclc/1011325885
