= Lilian Alá'í =

Australian woman with the title of Knight of Baháʼu'lláh

Lilian 'Alá'í
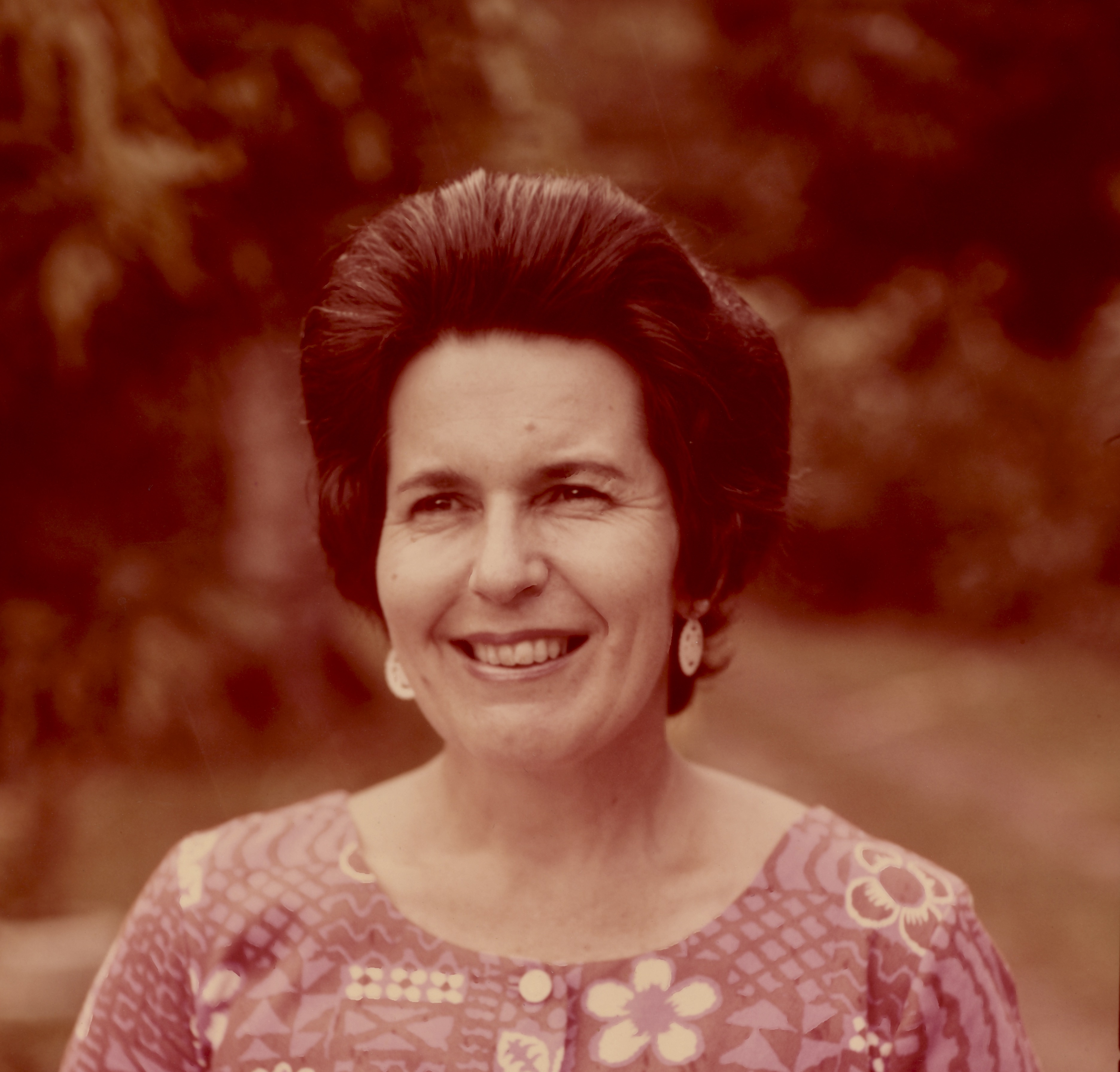
- Photo of Lilian 'Alá'í
- Born: Lilian Elizabeth Wyss; 2 July 1929; Queensland
- Died: 20 April 2023 (aged 93)
- Occupation: religious leader
- Known for: Member of the Bahá'í Faith in Australia with the title of Knight of Baháʼu'lláh

Lilian Elizabeth Alá'í (née Wyss) (2 July 1929 – 20 April 2023) was an Australian Bahá'í woman with the title of Knight of Baháʼu'lláh. She served the Bahá'í Faith for nearly eighty years, with approximately fifty-seven of those years dedicated to serving in Western Samoa and American Samoa. The title Knight of Baháʼu'lláh was given by Shoghi Effendi, Guardian of the Baháʼí Faith from 1921 to 1957, to Baháʼís who opened new territories as part of his goal-oriented ten-year Baháʼí teaching plans.

== Early life and education ==
'Alá'í learned about the Bahá'í Faith from school friends at an early age, and then became a Bahá'í in 1944. She first served the Bahá'í Faith through pioneering and teaching the Bahá'í Faith in Europe from 1947 to 1952. Returning to Australia at the request of Shoghi Effendi, the Guardian of the Faith from 1921 to 1957, 'Alá'í assisted the Australian Bahá’í Community teaching the Bahá'í Faith in various states in 1953. She then served on the National Spiritual Assembly of the Bahá’ís of Australia and New Zealand, before resigning to pioneer as the first Bahá'í in Western Samoa in 1954 as part of the global Ten Year Crusade, as a Knight of Baháʼu'lláh. 'Alá'í served the Bahá’í Faith in various administrative capacities in Western Samoa (Independent State of Samoa) and American Samoa until 2010, before returning again to Australia.

== Introduction to the Teachings of the Bahá'í Faith ==
Australian-born 'Alá'í and her brother Frank Wyss (1927–2007), while living in Tahmoor in rural New South Wales, heard of the Bahá'í Faith from their fellow students (who were siblings) at Bowral High School during the years of World War II. 'Alá'í and her brother Frank both accepted the Bahá'í Faith at the Yerrinbool Bahá'í School on different days in 1944. In a letter written on behalf of Shoghi Effendi, the Guardian of the Faith on 10 December 1944, 'Alá'í and her brother were referred to as “enlightened youth” by the Guardian, and welcomed into the Bahá'í Faith.

== Serving the Bahá'í Faith in Europe ==
'Alá'í's parents were Swiss immigrants and as such it was decided that 'Alá'í would spend time with her relatives in Switzerland when she completed her education. 'Alá'í, while based in Switzerland from 1947 to 1952, travelled extensively throughout Europe, which was emerging from the impacts of World War II. In December 1949, 'Alá'í offered her services to the European Teaching Committee to pioneer for the Bahá'í Faith in Europe, and this was approved by Shoghi Effendi, the Guardian of the Faith, in a letter addressed to 'Alá'í on 25 January 1950. 'Alá'í subsequently pioneered in Norway in 1950 for 6 months. In May 1952, 'Alá'í wrote to the Guardian, requesting to pioneer in Africa. In a letter addressed to 'Alá'í from Shoghi Effendi the Guardian of the Faith on 4 June 1952, the Guardian appealed to 'Alá'í to return to Australia and serve the Bahá'í Faith in the country of her birth, in order that the Australian Bahá'í community not fail in its teaching goals. 'Alá'í was one of the keynote speakers at the European Teaching Conference and Summer School in Luxembourg, organised by the European Teaching Committee in August–September 1952. 'Alá'í returned to Australia as requested, after serving the Faith in Europe, arriving in Sydney in December 1952.

== Serving the Bahá'í Faith in Australia ==
Upon returning to Australia, 'Alá'í was requested by the National Spiritual Assembly of the Bahá'ís of Australia and New Zealand to visit Bahá'í communities in four states in Australia and assist with their teaching campaigns. In February and March 1953, she spoke at a range of public venues about her experiences in Europe from 1947 to 1952, and also about the established principles of the Bahá'í Faith, including gender equality, the unity of humanity, elimination of racism and prejudice, universal education, elimination of the extremes of wealth and poverty, harmony of science and religion, progressive revelation, and the independent investigation of truth. Her public addresses at the time were enhanced through her presentation of colour slides of European countries. 'Alá'í was by all accounts an accomplished, inspiring, and energising speaker, and was described by the media at the time as “charming, vitally alive and keenly intellectual”. In April 1953, 'Alá'í was elected to the National Spiritual Assembly of the Bahá'ís of Australia and New Zealand. Her term with this national governing body was truncated however through the appeal of Shogi Effendi, the Guardian of the Faith, for Bahá'ís worldwide to pioneer to new territories as part of the Ten Year Crusade 1953–1963. Of the nine members of the National Spiritual Assembly at the time, 'Alá'í was one of six to decide to resign from the Assembly and pioneer to new territories. The response by these Australian Bahá'ís far exceeded the response of any other national governing body in the world. A letter addressed to 'Alá'í on behalf of Shoghi Effendi on 19 July 1953 recommended that in spite of important work with teaching and administration on the National Assembly, “pioneer work far more urgent at present”, strongly encouraging pioneering service in the Pacific Islands. It also emphasised that those Bahá'ís who were willing to undertake this commitment without delay would be “inscribed on the roll of honour”. 'Alá'í was officially inscribed on this Roll of Honour as a Knight of Bahá’u’lláh for Samoa Islands in March 1954.

== Pioneering as a Bahá'í and Settlement in Samoa Islands ==
After an initial attempt to pioneer to the Solomon Islands was unsuccessful, 'Alá'í decided to pioneer to Samoa. On the journey from Australia towards Samoa, 'Alá'í attended a Bahá'í Summer School in Auckland, New Zealand, where she met her future husband Suhayl 'Alá'í. On 14 January 1954, 'Alá'í arrived at Apia, Western Samoa, and was named a Knight of Bahá’u’lláh in the Roll of Honour by Shoghi Effendi, a title awarded to Bahá'ís who opened up new territories to the Bahá'í Faith during the Ten Year Crusade. 'Alá'í was successful in securing employment the day after arrival. However, in the first few months, she also experienced health challenges. 'Alá'í and Suhayl 'Alá'í married in Suva, Fiji in November 1954, with the wedding ceremony arranged by the Local Spiritual Assembly of Bahá'ís of Suva. This was the first Bahá'í marriage in the South Pacific. The wedding itself was notable for the cultural diversity and distances travelled, by the bride, groom, and guests. The couple then moved back to Apia, Western Samoa, and over the years two children were born and raised in Western Samoa. The parents of Suhayl 'Alá'í and his two younger siblings also pioneered as Bahá'ís in Apia, Western Samoa, but at the suggestion of the Guardian of the Faith, Shoghi Effendi, later pioneered to Hastings, New Zealand. In 1959, 'Alá'í, her husband and their two children permanently moved to American Samoa to pioneer and keep this territory open to the Faith. Their third child was born and raised in American Samoa, and they later established a business there.

== Serving the Bahá'í Faith in Samoa Islands ==
Through 'Alá'í's teaching and administrative skills, the Bahá'í Faith rapidly expanded and consolidated in Western Samoa. The first Local Spiritual Assembly in Apia, Western Samoa was formed in April 1957. In December 1958, the Local Spiritual Assembly of the Bahá'ís of Apia, with 'Alá'í as Secretary, arranged for the first Bahá'í Summer School in Western Samoa in December 1958. In 1959, Enoch Olinga was the first Hand of the Faith to visit Western Samoa. During the mid-1960s, 'Alá'í and her husband also served on the Spiritual Assembly of the Bahá'ís in Lakewood, California. During the late 1960s 'Alá'í was elected to the National Spiritual Assembly of the Bahá'ís of the South Pacific Ocean, a regional governing body for the Bahá'í communities of several Pacific nations. Following that, 'Alá'í served as an elected member of the National Assembly of the Bahá'ís of Samoa from 1970 to 1989, the governing body of the Bahá'í communities of both the Independent State of Samoa (formerly Western Samoa) and American Samoa, that was formed in 1970. 'Alá'í also attended international conferences in Australia over the years, such as in Sydney in October 1967 and in Canberra in September 1982 speaking as an ambassador for the Bahá'í community of Samoa, and of the broader South Pacific region.

== The Enduring Legacy of the Knight of Baháʼu'lláh for Samoa Islands ==
The dedicated and devout service of Australian-born 'Alá'í to the Bahá'í Faith spanned around eight decades in Europe, Australia, and the Pacific. As a teenager, 'Alá'í became a Bahá'í when her worldview was being shaped by Great Depression the horrors of World War II. At that time 'Alá'í was also in esteemed company of other young people in Bowral High School – her older brother Frank Wyss and Stanley Bolton, who along with 'Alá'í also became Knights of Bahá’u’lláh, an honour awarded to Bahá’ís who pioneered in new territories during the global Ten Year Crusade from 1953 to 1963. Frank Wyss pioneered to the Cocos Islands in the Indian Ocean on 4 June 1955, but was forced to leave soon after. He later pioneered to Papua New Guinea in 1957. Stanley Bolton pioneered to Tonga on 25 January 1954. After this group of young Bahá’ís left school, another young person with a distinguished future as a Bahá’ís also attended Bowral High School: Peter Khan, who would later serve as a member of the Universal House of Justice in Haifa, the supreme governing body of the Bahá'í Faith from 1987 until his retirement in 2010.

The leadership, inspiration, social connections, and exemplary service of 'Alá'í as a Bahá'í pioneer and Knight of Baháʼu'lláh, enabled considerable progress of the Bahá'í Faith in Western Samoa. His Highness Malietoa Tanumafili II, King of Samoa (and Head of State since independence from New Zealand in 1962), received a formal presentation of the Bahá'í Teachings by visiting Hand of the Cause Dr Ugo Giachery on 16 January 1968, became a believer, and publicly confirmed his acceptance of the Bahá'í Faith on 31 March 1973. He thus became the first reigning monarch to embrace the Bahá'í Faith. For almost two decades Suhayl 'Alá'í served as the liaison between the Universal House of Justice and His Highness Malietoa Tanumafili II. Another major achievement for the Bahá'í community in Western Samoa was the construction of the Mashriqu'l-Adhkár. Located at Tiapapata, this House of Worship is described as the Mother Temple of the Pacific Islands. The ceremony for the laying of the cornerstone of the Temple presided by Amatu'l-Bahá Rúhíyyih Khánum and His Highness Malietoa Tanumafili II, King of Samoa was on 27 January 1979, on the 25th anniversary of the arrival and establishment of the Bahá'í Faith in Western Samoa by 'Alá'í in 1954. Prior to this ceremony 'Alá'í gave a public address “Twenty-five years of the Bahá'í Faith in Samoa”. The official dedication ceremony for the Mashriqu'l-Adhkár on 1 September 1984 was also attended by Amatu'l-Bahá Rúhíyyih Khánum and His Highness Malietoa Tanumafili II, Head of State of Samoa. At this ceremony, ‘Alá’í was acknowledged for bringing the Bahá'í Faith to the Samoa Islands and for her service.

In May 1992, 'Alá'í was one of the 113 Knights of Baháʼu'lláh who assembled at the Bahá'í World Centre, Haifa. 'Alá'í was present at the “Waves of One Ocean” Conference in Apia in September 2004 which marked the 50th anniversary of the introduction of the Bahá'í Faith to Western Samoa and the 20th anniversary of the opening of the Bahá'í House of Worship, as part of golden jubilee celebrations in a number of counties where Bahá'í communities were established in the opening phases of the Ten Year Crusade. At the “Waves of One Ocean” Conference in September 2004, 'Alá'í gave an address about the 24 Knights of Baháʼu'lláh, 15 of them women, who took the Bahá'í Faith to the Pacific Islands. In 2014, for the 60th anniversary of the introduction of the Bahá'í Faith, the (then) Prime Minister of Samoa, Hon Tuilaʻepa Saʻilele Malielegaoi, expressed his gratitude for the Samoan Bahá'í community for “its long service to the development of Samoan society”. 'Alá'í’s service to the Bahá'í community also included working on radio and television programs produced in American Samoa and serving on the board of the Herald of the South international Bahá'í magazine.

Because of health issues, 'Alá'í, then aged 81, returned from American Samoa to Australia on 10 December 2010 to live with family. She had served the Bahá'í Faith in Western Samoa and American Samoa for more almost 57 years and was welcomed on arrival by members of expatriate Samoan Bahá'í community. In her later years residing in Australia, 'Alá'í continued to actively serve the Bahá'í Faith in various capacities 'Alá'í was an inspiration for the formation of, and regular attendee for, the Bahá'í-inspired Pasifika Gathering, which meets every three months. 'Alá'í died on 20 April 2023. The Bahá'í community of the Samoa Islands held a memorial service at the House of Worship in honour of 'Alá'í on 14 May 2023.
