= Clara Dunn =

Canadian teacher of the Baháʼí Faith (1869–1960)

- Born: Clara Holder; May 12, 1869; London, England, U.K.
- Died: November 18, 1960 (aged 91); Sydney, Australia
- Other names: Clara Davis
- Occupations: Nurse, religious leader

Clara Holder Davis Hyde Dunn (12 May 1869 – 18 November 1960) was a Canadian nurse born in England, who became a Baháʼí in 1907 in Walla Walla, Washington. In 1920, she moved to Australia with her husband John Henry Hyde Dunn, where they played a key role in establishing the Baháʼí communities of Australia and New Zealand.

== Early life ==
Clara Holder was born in London, one of the eight children of Thomas Holder and Maria McHugh Holder. Her parents were married in Dublin; her father was a farmer, a policeman, a railroad worker, and a veteran of the Crimean War. She was raised in Ireland and Canada.

== Career ==
As a young widow, she moved alone to Washington state in 1902, where she worked as a nurse and became a Bahá'í in 1907. She met 'Abdu'l-Bahá in California in 1912. She and her second husband Hyde Dunn moved to Australia in 1920, where they became leaders and teachers in the Bahá'í communities of Australia and New Zealand.

She traveled to Haifa on a pilgrimage in 1932. She met Shoghi Effendi in 1934, and he instructed her to organise a national assembly of the Bahá'í faith in Australia and New Zealand, to support the local communities. She and her husband organized the first annual Australia and New Zealand Convention of Bahá'ís in 1934.

As she grew older, she became known as "Mother" Dunn. She continued visiting Bahá'í gatherings and schools across Australia after her second husband died in 1941. She opened the Bahá'í headquarters in Sydney in 1944. She was named a Hand of the Cause of God by Shoghi Effendi in 1952. She attended the Bahá'í international gathering in New Delhi in 1953, and in 1954 she became Trustee for the Continental Fund for Australasia. She traveled to New Zealand to represent Effendi at the first national convention of Bahá'í there in 1947. She addressed the 1958 international conference of Bahá'ís held in Sydney in 1958.

== Personal life and legacy ==
Clara Holder married her first husband, William Allen Davis, in 1885; they moved to Canada. Her first husband died in an accident in 1887, when she was just seventeen, and pregnant with their son Allen; her son was raised by relatives. She became the second wife of English-born salesman John Henry Hyde Dunn in 1917. Her husband died in 1941, her son died in 1957, and she died in 1960, in Sydney, at the age of 91.

In 2020, the 100th anniversary of the Dunns' arrival in Australia was celebrated as a centenary by the Australian Bahá'í community.
