= The Promise of World Peace =

1985 Baháʼí Faith document

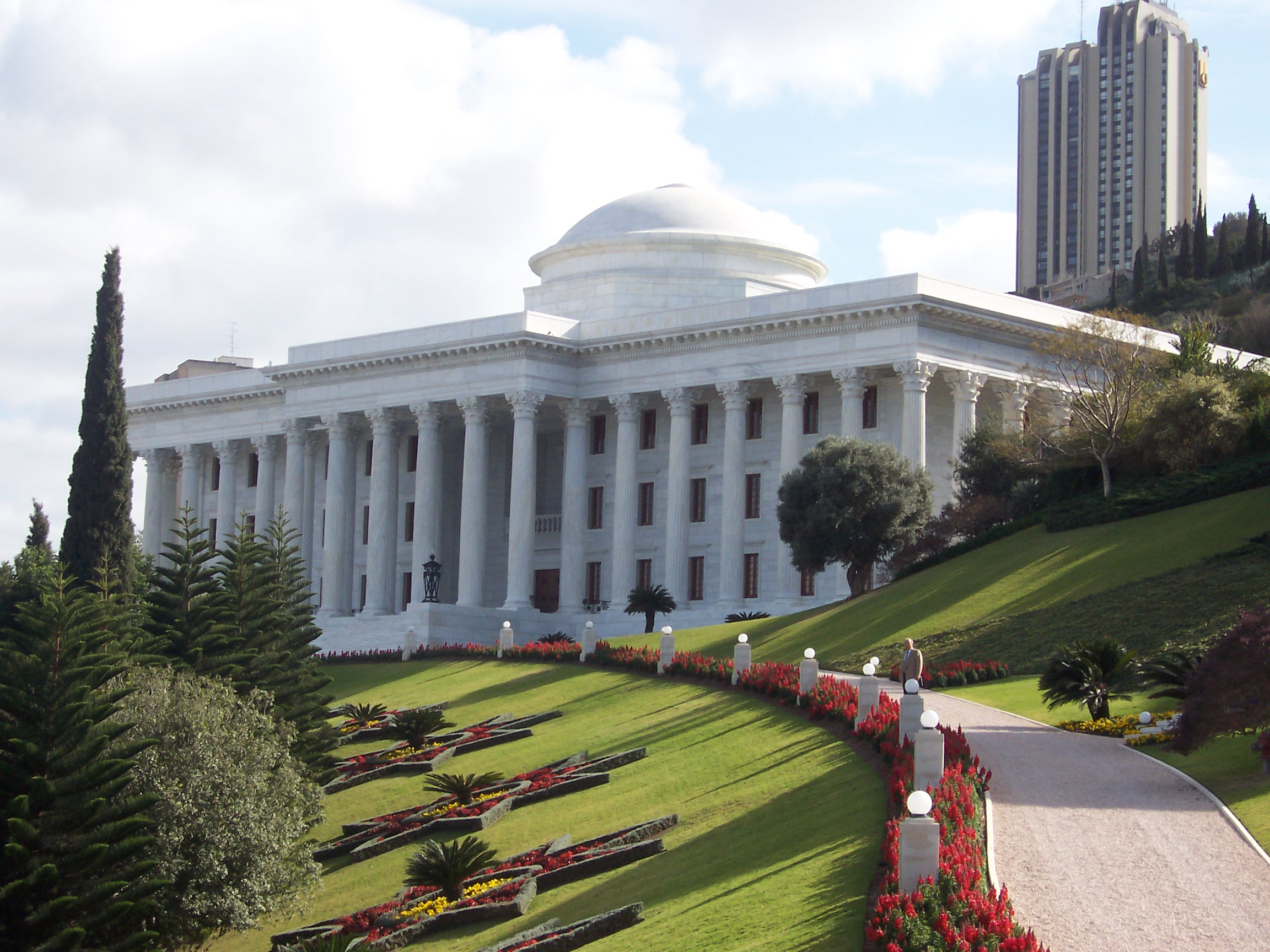
Seat of the Universal House of Justice

The Promise of World Peace is a document produced by the Universal House of Justice of the Baháʼí Faith in October 1985, on the occasion of the International Year of Peace. It outlines the major prerequisites for, as well as the obstacles working against, the establishment of world peace. As of January 1988 the peace statement had been presented to 198 heads of state, 75 directly and 123 indirectly. The statement has been translated into 76 languages and an estimated one to two million copies have been disseminated to people around the world. Some specifics by country were listed in 9 pages of the February 1988 issue of the Baháʼí News.

== Summary ==
In the document, the Universal House of Justice asserts that world peace is not only possible but inevitable, and it is now within reach for the first time in human history. It states, however, that the current international system of governance is flawed and is unable to eradicate the threats of war, terrorism, anarchy and economic instability. Adding to the problem is the widespread belief that human beings are intrinsically hostile and aggressive, and that these flaws make long-term global peace and stability unsustainable.

The statement presents a contrary argument that the human race has been developing and maturing throughout its history, that human beings are fundamentally spiritual in nature and are the creation of God. As a result, they are capable of building civilization and creating a peaceful world if they decide to do so. The Universal House of Justice asserts that peace cannot occur without religion and quotes Bahaʼu'lláh, the founder of the Bahaʼi Faith. “Religion is the greatest of all means for the establishment of order in the world and the peaceful contentment of all that dwell therein.”

It is the Universal House of Justice's contention that the source of religious strife does not lie with the different religions themselves, but rather with the negligence of humanity and the, “imposition of erroneous interpretations". These interpretations have separated faith from reason and science from religion. Having rejected religion as irrelevant, societies around the world have adopted a wide number of ideologies that have failed to serve and support the interests of humanity as a whole.

Peace cannot be achieved simply by banning particular weapons, resolving specific conflicts or by signing new treaties. It requires a whole new level of commitment. The statement asserts that a new framework must be adopted based on several overarching principles and a genuine interest in creating a peaceful and just world. The underlying problems that must be addressed include:

- Racism and discrimination based on race, gender and religious belief
- The inordinate disparity between the rich and the poor
- Unbridled nationalism
- Religious strife
- The inequality between men and women
- The lack of educational opportunity for many around the world
- A fundamental lack of communication between peoples. Adopting an international auxiliary language would go far toward resolving this problem and necessitates the most urgent attention.

The Universal House of Justice goes on to say that peace must be founded on the understanding that mankind is essentially one human family. It then calls for the leaders of the world to gather and deliberate on the problem, for the full support of the United Nations and the willing assent of all people for that process of deliberation.

== See also ==
- Baháʼí Faith and the unity of humanity
- Socio-economic development (Baháʼí)
