= Collis Featherstone =

Australian Baháʼí (1913–1990)

Harold Collis Featherstone
- Title: Hand of the Cause of God

Personal life
- Born: May 13, 1913 Quorn, South Australia
- Died: September 29, 1990 (aged 77) Kathmandu, Nepal
- Home town: Smithfield, South Australia
- Occupation: Engineer

Religious life
- Religion: Baháʼí Faith

Harold Collis Featherstone (13 May 1913 – 29 September 1990) was an Australian Baháʼí from Adelaide. Born in Quorn, South Australia and a childhood in Smithfield, South Australia and then studied accounting but took up engineering in 1932 and worked for a large engineering firm until 1936. By the time he married in 1938 he was already a partner in an engineering business making pressed metal parts. He and his wife joined the Baháʼí Faith in 1944 as the first of "young people" to enter in the Adelaide community (see Baháʼí Faith in Australia). He exchanged some 20 letters and cables on all manner of subjects with the then head of the religion, Shoghi Effendi. In 1946 the Featherstones helped establish the Woodville Baháʼí Local Spiritual Assembly. Featherstone served in the National Spiritual Assembly of Australia from 1949 to 1962.

In 1954 he was appointed to a new institution for the religion as an Auxiliary Board member for Australia by Clara Dunn and was able to rearrange his business affairs to allow him flexibility and freedom to travel widely by becoming a co-owner of an engineering company. In October 1957 he was appointed a Hand of the Cause of God by Shoghi Effendi. From 1957, Featherstone maintained an 18-member Auxiliary Board (nine for propagation, nine for protection), spread throughout the Pacific, until that function was assumed by a three-member Continental Board of Counsellors for Australasia in 1968. In 1976 Featherstone sold his business interest and the family moved to Rockhampton, Queensland, and devoted their time to the interests of the religion. He and his wife traveled widely among the countries of the Pacific and beyond.

On 29 September 1990 he died in Kathmandu, Nepal.
