= Ugo Giachery =

Italian Hand of the Cause

Ugo Giachery (May 13, 1896 – July 5, 1989) was a prominent Italian Baháʼí from an aristocratic family from Palermo. At an anniversary of the founding of the spiritual assembly of Perugia Giachery told the story of how, as a young wounded soldier, still ignorant of the Baháʼí Faith, he was in Perugia in 1916. After World War I he moved to the United States, where he became a Baháʼí around 1926. In 1947, his family moved back to Rome in Italy. He translated many Baháʼí books into Italian. From 1948 he started taking care of the marble supplies from Italy for the superstructure of the Shrine of the Báb and the International Archives Building.

He was appointed a Hand of the Cause by Shoghi Effendi in December 1951, who also appointed him as a member-at-large of the International Baháʼí Council, and who named one of the doors of the Shrine of the Báb after him.

== Works ==
- Giachery, Ugo (1973). Shoghi Effendi - Recollections. Oxford, UK: George Ronald. ISBN 0-85398-050-0.
