= Baháʼí Faith by country =

The Baháʼí Faith formed in the mid-19th century in Iran, later gaining converts in India, East Africa, and the Western world. The Bahá'í Faith is established in more than 100,000 localities in virtually every country and territory around the world. Traveling promoters of the religion played a significant role in spreading the religion into most countries and territories during the second half of the 20th century, mostly seeded out of North America by the planned migration of individuals. The Baháʼí Faith was recognized as having a widespread international membership by the 1980s. (Note: In the “World Religious Statistics” section of the 1988 Britannica Book of the Year, David B. Barrett described Christianity, Islam, and the Baháʼí Faith as the most geographically widespread religions. A table presenting estimates for 1987 listed approximately 4.63 million Baháʼís in 205 countries, compared with more than 860 million Muslims in 172 countries.). Denis MacEoin asserted in 2000 that Baháʼí Faith was the second-most geographically widespread religion after Christianity.

The Baháʼí World Centre estimated over a million Bahá'ís in 1965, 5 million in 1991, and about 8 million in 2020. The official agencies of the religion have focused on publishing data such as numbers of local and national spiritual assemblies, countries and territories represented, languages and tribes represented, schools, and publishing trusts, not the total number of believers.

Analyzing Baháʼí data on localities and activity levels, Danish sociologist Margit Warburg suggested that by 2001, registered Baháʼís reliably numbered over 5 million. Other independent estimates, such as Encyclopædia Britannica in 2010, and the World Christian Encyclopedia in 2001, listed Baháʼís and sympathizers (Note: Peter Smith found that the World Christian Encyclopedia, which consistently gave estimates higher than registered Baháʼís, is meant to include "members plus those who regularly attend Baháʼí events, that is including a wider circle of sympathizers as well as declared Baháʼís".) as over 7 million. The Baháʼí Faith was described in 2013 as the fastest growing religion by percentage across the 20th century.

The number of Baháʼí adherents is difficult to estimate accurately. Few national Baháʼí communities have the administrative capacity to enumerate their members and Baháʼí membership data does not break out active participation from the total number of people who have expressed their belief. Due to its small size, few censuses or religious surveys include the Baháʼí Faith as a separate category (Note: In 2012 the Pew Research Center published a report on the Global Religious Landscape. Baháʼís were grouped into the category "Other Religions" together with Sikhs, Zoroastrians, and various others. The report said, "Because of the lack of data on these faiths in many countries, the Pew Forum has not attempted to estimate the size of individual religions within this category..." It also noted: "Although some faiths in the 'other religions' category have millions of adherents around the world, censuses and surveys in many countries do not measure them specifically. Estimates of the global size of these faiths generally come from other sources, such as the religious groups themselves.") and some government censuses count Baháʼís as Muslims or Hindus. Country-level detail from the World Christian Encyclopedia (WCE), on which many estimates rely, counts declared Baháʼís along with sympathizers, leading to much higher counts than those of self-identifying Baháʼís.

== Difficulties in enumeration ==
The fact that the religion is diffuse and proportionally small is a major barrier to demographic research by outsiders. Even in the United States, where significant resources are dedicated to gathering data, the Baháʼí Faith is often omitted from religious surveys due to the high sample size required to reduce the margin of error. In the Middle East, especially Iran, Baháʼís face persecution, and the lack of Baháʼí administration makes it difficult to maintain a count.

Baháʼí authors Peter Smith and Moojan Momen, commenting on the difficulties of counting Baháʼís, wrote the following:

With any religious movement there are invariable problems of quantification unless the movement's own enumeration techniques are exceptionally efficient, or government censuses incorporate questions on religion. Even here there are often considerable problems of definition. Are gradations of commitment to be taken into consideration so as to differentiate between active and nominal members? Are the children of members to be included as well as adults? Is allowance to be made for the pattern of multi-religious adherence which is common in many parts of the world? These are, of course, problems that affect the estimation of numbers for any religion and are not confined to Bahá'í statistics.

— Smith & Momen, "The Bahá'í Faith 1957–1988: A Survey of Contemporary Developments", Religion (1989)

=== Definition of membership ===
Throughout the early development of the Baháʼí Faith in Iran and the West, Baháʼís often retained some of the religious identity that they converted from, many remaining members of churches and mosques. Later, Shoghi Effendi made it clear that the Baháʼí Faith was its own tradition with laws and institutions, and that Baháʼís could not remain members of other religions. The practice of maintaining membership rolls of believers began in the 1920s.

In the 1930s the Baháʼís of the United States and Canada began requiring new adherents to sign a declaration of faith, stating their belief in Baháʼu'lláh, the Báb, and ʻAbdu'l-Bahá, and affirming that there are laws and institutions to obey. The original purpose of signing a declaration card was to allow followers to apply for lawful exemption from active military service. The signature of a card later became optional in Canada, but in the US is still used for records and administrative requirements.

All local and national Spiritual Assemblies are expected to keep membership records that include declarations of faith and withdrawals, which are used for annual assembly elections. The Baháʼí system of membership thus has a system of contracting into the religion and some maintenance of the membership list is required for community functioning. Being removed from membership requires an opposite declaration of disbelief.

=== Children ===
A peculiar difficulty arises in counting Baháʼís because a tenet of the faith is that parents cannot choose the religion of their children and that 15 is the age of spiritual maturity when an individual can make the choice. Early membership rolls excluded children of Baháʼís and didn't even count them separately. In 1979 the Universal House of Justice requested that children be included separately for statistical purposes, matching the methodology of most censuses and surveys. Before that, membership rolls may have only indicated ages 21 or older (the age required for voting).

The change toward including children in statistics caused an increase in the total number of reported Baháʼís in the late 1980s, but has been consistent since.

=== Active vs inactive ===
Another difficulty arises from defining membership based on participation. The number of active participants in any religious movement will always be smaller than the number who profess belief. The prevailing norm in the Western world is that members of minority religious groups must be actively participating to be considered a member, and members of majority religious groups have a large number of passive adherents. Margit Warburg wrote,

As with other voluntary organisations, some members become more active than others, but the fact that there is no fixed membership subscription means that there is no economic motive for inactive Baháʼís to take the initiative to resign membership. Inactive Baháʼís, however, are not expelled just because they are inactive in community life, since in principle they could still be believing Baháʼís.

Warburg also noted: "Baháʼís do not lose membership status just by being inactive."

In the 1980s the Baháʼís of the United States started including "address unknown" in their membership statistics; members designated as such may profess belief but are no longer participating in community life. For example, in its 2020 Annual Report the US National Spiritual Assembly had 177,647 registered Baháʼís of all ages, only 77,290 of which had good addresses, and 57,341 total participants in core activities, with 37% of attendees from outside of the Baháʼí population. The higher American number has been challenged because it includes some who no longer believe, but the lower number with good addresses does not include inactive Baháʼís who continue their belief. As author William Garlington noted,

Just as there are many people who claim to be followers of Jesus Christ and yet are not official members of an established church, it seems fair to assume that there are a sizable number of individuals who identify with Baha'u'llah and his principles while remaining outside the established institutions of the Baha'i Faith... the significant point is that at least [the registered Baha'is] have experienced enough identity with the Baha'i teachings to have made official written declarations of that belief.

Using activity data, Warburg estimated a percentage of activity in Baháʼí communities around the world and concluded that in 2001 there were reliably 5.1 million registered Baháʼís in the world and 900,000 active Baháʼís, or 18% of the total. The estimates on activity were broken out by continent: Europe 82% active, USA and Canada 71%, Australia and New Zealand 91%, Africa 22%, India 5%, Other Asia 26%, Latin America 13%, and Oceania 43%. On the question of whether the Baháʼí numbers are intentionally inflated, Warburg feels that the "numbers are not rooted in any sinister manipulation of data".

== Number of Baháʼís worldwide ==
=== Baháʼí sources ===
- In 2020, the Secretariat of the Universal House of Justice wrote, "on the basis of information received from Baháʼí communities across the world, and on reputable external sources", the current estimate for the number of Baháʼís worldwide is "about eight million", and Baháʼís reside in "well over 100,000 localities".
- A 1997 statement by the NSA of South Africa wrote: "…the Baháʼí Faith enjoys a world-wide following in excess of six million people."
- As early as 1991 official estimates were of "more than five million Baháʼís", which was still in use as of 2020.
- In 1989, the journal Religion published an article by Baháʼí authors Moojan Momen and Peter Smith. They observed that in the 1950s there were "probably in the region of 200,000 Baháʼís world-wide. The vast majority of these (over 90%) lived in Iran. There were probably fewer than 10,000 Baháʼís in the West and no more than 3,000 Baháʼís in the Third World, mostly India". By the end of the 1960s, they wrote, "we 'guestimate' that there may now have been about one million Baháʼís." And by 1988 they estimated about 4.5 million.
- A 1987 report, published in the United States Baháʼí News reported 3.62 million Baháʼís in 1979 and 4.74 million Baháʼís in 1986, a growth of 31% over the period, or 4.4% per year on average.
- The document The Promise of World Peace, produced by the Universal House of Justice in 1985, stated that the Bahá’í community has "some three to four million people".
- Baháʼí author Moojan Momen wrote in 2008, "In the early 1950s, there were probably some 200,000 Baháʼís in the world. This has increased to about a million by the late 1960s, about four and a half million by the late 1980s, and over five million by 2000s."
- The first known survey of the religion comes from an unpublished work in 1919–1920 gathered by John Esslemont and had been intended to be part of his well-known Baháʼu'lláh and the New Era. In it, consulting various individuals, he summarizes the religion's presence in Egypt, Germany, India, Iran, Iraq, Turkestan, and the United States. It did not arrive at a total but did have some regional statistics based on some individual reports.
- In 1867, 53 Baháʼís from Baghdad sent an appeal to the American Consul in Beirut for assistance in freeing Bahá'u'lláh from Ottoman captivity. According to missionary Henry Harris Jessup, "The petitioners claim that they number 40,000."

=== Other sources ===
==== 2010s and newer ====
- In 2020, the World Religion Database has estimated a worldwide Baháʼí population of 8,531,050.
- In 2017, The Economist reported that there were more than 7 million Baháʼís in the world.
- In 2016, the book 12 Major World Religions wrote, "Today it numbers at least 5 million adherents and possibly more."
- In 2015, the Yearbook of International Religious Demography noted just over 7.8 million Baháʼís in the world, having grown at an overall rate of 2.79% across the century 1910 to 2010. The 10 countries with the largest Baháʼí populations were: India, United States, Kenya, Vietnam, DR Congo, Philippines, Zambia, South Africa, Iran and Bolivia, ranging from 232,000 to just over 2,000,000 in India.
- In 2013, the book The World's Religions in Figures: An Introduction to International Religious Demography wrote, "The Baha'i Faith is the only religion to have grown faster in every United Nations region over the past 100 years than the general population; Bahaʼi was thus the fastest-growing religion between 1910 and 2010, growing at least twice as fast as the population of almost every UN region."
- In 2011, Bei Dawei said in an academic conference presentation that the Baháʼí Faith had "several hundred thousand" adherents. He noted that "estimates of five, six, or seven million are more usually encountered" but said that these estimates are projections based on self-reporting by Baháʼís and that the national figures they are based on "tend to exceed apparent Bahá'í activity by whole orders of magnitude."
- In 2010, The World Religion Database stated that there were 7.3 million Baháʼís in the world. The Association of Religion Data Archives cited this estimate. Encyclopædia Britannica also estimated a total of 7.3 million Baháʼís residing in 221 countries. Religions of the World: A Comprehensive Encyclopedia of Beliefs and Practices estimated 7.4 million Baháʼís, citing UN median variant figures from World Population Prospects: The 2006 Revision.

==== 2000s ====
- In 2009, Paula Hartz wrote in World Religions: Baha'i Faith: "Today the Baha’i Faith has some 5 million followers. It is one of the world’s fastest-growing religions. It is also probably the most diverse."
- In 2007, The World Factbook states that Baháʼís make up 0.12% of the world, corresponding to 7.9 million people.
- In 2006, Margit Warburg's academic book on the Baháʼí Faith claimed, "a conservative estimate would be that in 2001 there were about 5.1 million registered Baháʼís in the world."
- In 2005, the Association of Religion Data Archives estimate is of 7.6 million, which is also echoed elsewhere. The Encyclopedia of Religion, second edition, records that: "In the early twenty-first century the Baháʼís number close to six million in more than two hundred countries. The number of adherents rose significantly in the late twentieth century from a little more than one million at the end of the 1960s."
- In 2004, the Encyclopedia of the Modern Middle East and North Africa reported that "Baháʼís worldwide [are] estimated in 2001 at 5 million."
- In 2003, World Book Encyclopedia reported that "there are about 5,500,000 Baháʼís worldwide."
- In 2001, World Christian Encyclopedia (2nd edition, 2001) estimated 7.1 million adherents of the Baháʼí Faith in the year 2000 representing 0.1% of the world population. The same source projected 12 million in 2025 and 18 million in 2050, assuming then-current trends were to continue. They also noted, "In government censuses Baháʼís are usually counted as Muslims or Hindus and not shown separately."
- In 2000, Encyclopædia Britannica estimated a total of 7.1 million Baháʼís residing in 218 countries. Denis MacEoin wrote in the Handbook of Living Religions that:

"The movement has had remarkable success in establishing itself as a vigorous contender in the mission fields of Africa, India, parts of South America, and the Pacific, thus outstripping other new religions in a world-wide membership of perhaps 4 million and an international spread recently described as second only to that of Christianity. The place of Baha'ism among world religions now seems assured."

==== 1950 to 1999 ====
- In 1998, the Academic American Encyclopedia said that the Baháʼís "are estimated to number about 2 million."
- In 1997, Dictionary of World Religions said that there are five million Baháʼís" in the world. Religions of the World published: "today there are about 5 million" Baháʼís.
- In 1995, the HarperCollins Dictionary of Religion stated: "In 1985, it was estimated that there were between 1.5 to 2 million Baha'is, with the greatest areas of recent growth in Africa, India, and Vietnam."
- In 1993, the Columbia Encyclopedia published: "There are about 5 million Baháʼís in the world."
- In 1982, the World Christian Encyclopedia (1st edition, 1982) wrote of Baháʼí adherents in the world: “(1970) 2,659,400, (1980) 3,822,600 in 194 countries, (1985) 4,442,600.”
- Religions of the World: A Comprehensive Encyclopedia of Beliefs and Practices (2010) estimated 2.7 million Baháʼís in 1970, citing UN median variant figures from World Population Prospects: The 2006 Revision.
- Paul Oliver wrote in World Faiths (2001) that there were "approximately five million Baháʼís" in 1963.
- Paula Hartz wrote in World Religions: Baha'i Faith (2009) that by the end of Shoghi Effendi's life in 1957, "the Baha'i Faith had reached more than 400,000 [adherents]."

==== 1900 to 1950 ====
- The 1922 census of Palestine lists 265 Bahá'í in Mandatory Palestine (152 in Haifa, four in Tiberias, three in Al Nahr wal Tal, two in 'Affuleh, one each in Samakh and Al-Hama (Note: "Samakh and Al-Hama" are grouped rather than listed as separate locations.) and Tulkarm), which increased on the 1931 census of Palestine to 350 Bahá'í (196 in Haifa, 51 in Acre, 35 in Acre's suburbs, 10 in Lydda, eight each in El Mazra'a and Hebron, seven each in Jerusalem (New City) and Tiberias, six in Nuqeib, five each in Beersheba, Nazareth, and Samra, four in El Bassa, one each in Jaffa, Rosh Pinna (police), and Yibna).
- Harry Luke, an official in the British Colonial Office, wrote in The Fringe of the East (1913) that there were "more than two million adherents" of the Baháʼí Faith.
- The World Christian Encyclopedia (1st edition, 1982) lists the global Baháʼí population of 1900 at 9,025.
- The Encyclopedia of the Modern Middle East and North Africa (2004) reported that "By 1900, the community… had reached 50,000–100,000"
- Paula Hartz wrote in World Religions: Baha'i Faith (3rd edition, 2009) that during the last years of ʻAbdu'l-Bahá's life (d. 1921), "The faith was now established in many countries around the world and its followers numbered around 100,000."

During ʻAbdu'l-Bahá's tour of North America, several newspapers made claims of how large the religion was, with figures in the range of millions of people:

- In 1912, a reporter in Salt Lake City claimed ʻAbdu'l-Bahá said the religion had "10,000,000 followers in the world."
- On June 16, 1912, a news report introduced him as the "Persian religious leader and spiritual and temporal head of the 14,000,000 of Baháʼís scattered throughout the world."
- On April 24, 1912, a newspaper article said "Baháʼísm now has 15,000,000 adherents scattered throughout the world, several hundred thousand of whom are in the United States and Canada."
- On April 12, 1912, a newspaper introduced him as "head of one of the newest and most thriving religions in the world, numbering 20,000,000 souls among his followers, of whom several hundred souls are in New York."
- On September 9, 1911, a news report about ʻAbdu'l-Bahá's visit to London claimed "at a moderate estimate, three million followers."

== Adherents by country ==
Although the Baháʼí News Service has reported on the total number of Baháʼís in the world, the data is not broken out by country.

The World Christian Encyclopedia (WCE), and its successor The World Christian Database (WCD), is an authority on membership data for religions in the world, and its decades-long study by David Barrett and co-workers is a basis for many other estimates of Baháʼís in the world, such as ARDA. The data were released in editions of 1982, 2001, and 2018, and includes a break down by country. The WCE data has consistently reported higher numbers of Baháʼís than the reports of Baháʼí institutions. Danish researcher Margit Warburg studied Baháʼí membership data and feels that the WCE data is overstated for Baháʼís. For instance, WCE reports an estimated 1,600 Baháʼís in Denmark in 1995 and 682,000 Baháʼís in the USA. The number of registered Baháʼís at the same time were 240 and 130,000, respectively. Peter Smith found that the WCE data is meant to include "members plus those who regularly attend Baháʼí events, that is including a wider circle of sympathizers as well as declared Baháʼís".

The Association for Religious Data Archives (ARDA) is "a collection of surveys, polls, and other data submitted by the foremost scholars and research centers in the world." It gathers data from, "the US Census Bureau's International Data Base, the US State Department's International Religious Freedom Report, the United Nations Human Development Reports, and others" including World Christian Database.

Baháʼí Faith by country
Country or territory	Baháʼí sources	WCE (1980)	WCE (2000)	ARDA (2010) (Note: The ARDA's data is reproduced from the World Christian Database's 2010 estimates.)	UNSD	Other sources
Afghanistan (details)		600	23,075	16,541		400 (2007)
Albania (details)	14,024		5,711	7,126		
Algeria (details)		1,000	2,806	3,309		
American Samoa (details)	925 (2014) (Note: Samoa and American Samoa share a single Baháʼí National Spiritual Assembly)	280	990			
Andorra (details)			110			
Angola (details)		600	1,488	2,061		
Anguilla (details)		50	86			
Antigua and Barbuda (details)		320	629		51 (2009)	
Argentina (details)		6,900	10,212	13,972		
Armenia (details)			1,331	1,190		
Aruba (details)			148			
Australia (details)	17,000	11,300	33,536	19,365	14,937 (2023)	8,947 (1996); 11,036 (2001); 12,331 (2006); 13,988 (2016)
Austria (details)		2,120	3,780	1,948	760 (2001)	
Azerbaijan (details)			1,432	1,685		
Bahamas (details)		430	1,241	1,375	65 (2013)	
Bahrain (details)		500	1,379	2,832		
Bangladesh (details)		4,200	8,341	9,603		300,000
Barbados (details)	400 (2010)	1,440	3,522	3,337	98 (2016)	178 (2010)
Belarus (details)			106	100		
Belgium (details)		1,900	2,358	2,617		
Belize (details)		4,100	6,941	7,742	216 (2014)	202 (2010)
Benin (details)		5,400	13,074	11,637		
Bermuda (details)		120	325		124 (2011)	
Bhutan (details)		300	647	74		
Bolivia (details)	100,000 (1988)	160,000	269,246	215,359		
Bosnia and Herzegovina (details)			0	0		
Botswana (details)		4,600	12,417	16,464	2,074 (2015)	700 (2001)
Brazil (details)		18,000	36,745	42,108		
British Virgin Islands (details)		90	192		10 (2016)	
Brunei (details)		710	981	199		
Bulgaria (details)			657	592		
Burkina Faso (details)		600 (Note: The source refers to the country by its old name, Republic of Upper Volta.)	2,767	2,860		
Burundi (details)		2,200	5,414	6,779		
Cambodia (details)	10,000	35,000	12,862	16,659		
Cameroon (details)	40,000	49,600	64,286	49,885		
Canada (details)	30,000	40,000	31,396	46,826	18,975 (2022)	
Cape Verde (details)		200	655	759		
Cayman Islands (details)		80	336			
Central African Republic (details)		6,500	7,833	10,913		
Chad (details)		7,000	80,683	94,499		
Chile (details)	6,000 (2002)	9,600	17,943	26,382		
People's Republic of China (details)			6,525	6,012		
Colombia (details)	30,000	38,000	64,758	70,504		
Comoros (details)		390	521	647		
Congo, Republic of (details)		6,200	12,927	25,879		
Congo, Democratic Republic of (details)	70,000	180,000	224,596	282,916		
Cook Islands (details)		160	161			
Costa Rica (details)	4,000	8,400	11,571	13,457		3,000
Croatia (details)	150 (2006)		0	0		
Cuba (details)		620	1,139	1,145		
Cyprus (details)		400	828	1,170		
Czech Republic (details)			950	966		
Denmark (details)	240 (1995); 375 (2013)	1,400	1,785	1,264		1,600 (1995)
Djibouti (details)		140	552	769		
Dominica (details)		70	1,225			
Dominican Republic (details)		5,500	5,904	6,899		
East Timor (details)		300	1,190			
Ecuador (details)		27,000	15,599	17,820		
Egypt (details)	3,000 (1960); 500 (1987); 500 (2001); 1,000–2,000 (2019)	1,500	5,760	6,946		2,000
El Salvador (details)	12,000 (1990)	15,000	27,712	27,345		
Equatorial Guinea (details)		900	2,317	3,589		
Eritrea (details)			1,198	1,426		
Estonia (details)			459	496		
Eswatini (details)		11,000	4,516			
Ethiopia (details)		11,000	21,592	22,764		
Falkland Islands (details)		50	67		12 (2009)	
Faroe Islands (details)		50	124			
Fiji (details)		1,800	5,674	2,338		
Finland (details)	775 (2013)	2,500	1,676	1,674	653 (2021)	
France (details)	5,000	3,700	4,136	4,453		
French Guiana (details)		500	725			
French Polynesia (details)		360	695			
Gabon (details)		300	405	605		
Gambia (details)		5,100	10,790	14,184		
Georgia (details)			1,725	1,639		
Germany (details)	6,000 (2019) (Note: Minors under 15 years of age not counted.)	11,500 (Note: This number is for West Germany, and there is no entry for Baháʼís in East Germany.)	12,391	12,356		5,600 (2005)
Ghana (details)		10,000	12,146	14,106		
Greece (details)		300	611	189		
Greenland (details)		280	355			
Grenada (details)		160	145			
Guadeloupe (details)		640	1,595			
Guam (details)		800	1,863			
Guatemala (details)		7,000	20,073	19,898		
Guinea (details)		140	288	150		
Guinea-Bissau (details)		90	333	266		
Guyana (details)	110 (1969); 22,000 (1989)	2,700	14,584	11,787		500 (2002); 800 (2019)
Haiti (details)		11,700	17,055	22,614		
Honduras (details)		11,600	32,635	37,591		
Hong Kong (details)		600		1,120		
Hungary (details)		100	246	290		
Iceland (details)	360 (2013)	400	801	599		
India (details)	2,000,000 (2020)	1,050,000 (Note: Source separately lists 10,000 in the Indian state of Sikkim)	1,716,148	1,897,651		5,574 (1991); 1,000,000 (1996); 400,000 (1999); 11,324 (2001); 100,000 (2002); 4,572 (2011)
Indonesia (details)		15,000	26,537	22,815		
Iran (details)	300,000 (1988); 110,000 (2010); 300,000 (2020)	340,000	463,151	251,127		300,000–350,000 (1979); 150,000–300,000; 300,000 (2019)
Iraq (details)	2,000	700	2,607	3,801		
Ireland (details)		900	1,274	1,550	520 (2012)	
Israel (details)	650	600	13,734	11,705		
Italy (details)		4,600	5,681	5,108		
Ivory Coast (details)		6,000	22,289	30,321		
Jamaica (details)	4,000	5,000	7,456	5,157	269 (2013)	
Japan (details)		12,500	15,579	15,594		
Jordan (details)		1,000	17,221	15,655		
Kazakhstan (details)				6,967		
Kenya (details)	25,000–40,000	180,000	308,292	422,782		
Kiribati (details)		3,500	4,321		2,322 (2013)	
Korea, North (details)		0	0	0		
Korea, South (details)	200	18,000	32,096	33,084		
Kuwait (details)		2,000	5,172	8,992		
Kyrgyzstan (details)			0	1,426		
Laos (details)		150	1,229	13,450	2,122 (2019)	
Latvia (details)			0	0		
Lebanon (details)		1,400	3,272	3,889		
Lesotho (details)		10,700	19,062	19,195		
Liberia (details)		5,000	8,955	11,231		
Libya (details)		300	560	636		
Liechtenstein (details)		60	107			
Lithuania (details)			0	267	29 (2014)	
Luxembourg (details)		1,400	1,546	1,597		
Macao (details)		130				
Madagascar (details)		5,600	15,270	18,347		
Malawi (details)	15,000 (2003)	11,600	24,501	34,323		
Malaysia (details)	30,000 (1986)	62,000	97.78	67,549		
Maldives (details)		25	60	120		
Mali (details)		640	1,030	1,244		
Malta (details)		140	255	274		
Marshall Islands (details)			1,023			
Martinique (details)		1,600	2,031			
Mauritania (details)		140	267	346		
Mauritius (details)	7,500	9,500	21,848	23,742	645 (2012)	
Mexico (details)		23,000	33,903	38,902		
Micronesia, Federated States of (details)	8,000		1,909			
Moldova (details)			0	526		
Monaco (details)		30	57			
Mongolia (details)	8,000–9,000 (2020)	0	53	55		
Montenegro (details)				0		
Montserrat (details)		200				
Morocco (details)	350–400	3,200	28,719	32,598		
Mozambique (details)		1,400	3,405	2,877		
Myanmar (details)		15,000	49,044	78,915		
Namibia (details)		500	8,864	10,995		
Nauru (details)		130	1,106			
Nepal (details)		4,000	6,163	4,366	537 (2023)	1,211 (2011)
Netherlands (details)	11 (1948); 110 (1962); 365 (1973); 525 (1979)	3,100	5,506	6,672		
New Caledonia (details)		570	932			
New Zealand (details)		3,200	3,878	7,518	2,634 (2013)	2,925 (2018)
Nicaragua (details)		4,000	9,616	10,918		
Niger (details)		1,100	2,978	5,528		
Nigeria (details)		21,000	27,031	38,190		
North Macedonia (details)			0	0		
Norway (details)	1,200 (2013)	1,400	2,179	2,737		1,015 (2007)
Oman (details)		420	9,123	9,987		
Pakistan (details)	30,000 (2001)	25,000	78,658	87,259		33,734 (2012); 31,543 (2018); 2,000–3,000 (2013)
Palau (details)			150		96 (2005)	
Panama (details)		20,000	35,318	41,170		
Papua New Guinea (details)	40,000 (2006)	17,900	34,939	59,898		
Paraguay (details)		2,900	9,011	10,624		
Peru (details)		20,000	36,463	41,316		
Philippines (details)	64,000	115,000	229,522	275,069		
Poland (details)			504	766		
Portugal (details)	6,000	2,000	1,845	2,086		
Puerto Rico (details)		1,400	2,788	2,698		
Qatar (details)		420	985	2,717		
Réunion (details)		1,800	5,927			
Romania (details)	542 (1990)	100	1,843	1,895		
Russia (details)	3,000	4,600 (Note: Data is for the USSR)	16,586	19,338		
Rwanda (details)	4,000	7,500	14,211	19,592		
Samoa (details)	925 (2014) (Note: Samoa and American Samoa share a single Baháʼí National Spiritual Assembly)	3,300	4,178		817 (2018)	
São Tomé and Príncipe (details)		90	3,011	1,645 (Note: Source gives the number for Guadalupe, which is the main city of the nation of São Tomé and Príncipe.)		
Saudi Arabia (details)		1,000	4,045	5,138		
Senegal (details)		3,200	16,804	23,883		
Serbia (details)				1,268		
Seychelles (details)		210	312		392 (2005)	
Sierra Leone (details)		1,150	11,385	13,765		
Singapore (details)		900	5,482	7,963		
Slovakia (details)	200		667	686	1,065 (2013)	
Slovenia (details)			297	396		
Solomon Islands (details)		800	1,903			
Somalia (details)		1,000	2,110 (Note: Source lists 1,838 in Somalia and 272 in Somaliland)	2,677		
South Africa (details)		23,000	255,775	238,532	2,264 (2000)	
South Sudan (details)						
Spain (details)		4,500	13,647	13,528		
Sri Lanka (details)		9,700	15,489	15,502		
Sudan (details)		700	1,828	2,706		
Suriname (details)		5,000	6,424	3,591		
Sweden (details)	1,080 (2013)	1,900	5,048	6,814		
Switzerland (details)		3,500	3,728	3,878		
Syria (details)		100	123	430		
Taiwan (details)		5,000	12,555	16,252		
Tajikistan (details)			743	3,092		1,000 (2018)
Tanzania (details)	35,000	60,000	140,593	190,419		
Thailand (details)		10,000	144,243	65,096		
Togo (details)		2,800	25,395	30,423		
Tonga (details)		1,700	6,582		730 (2023)	
Trinidad and Tobago (details)		8,000	15,627	15,973		
Tunisia (details)		520	1,917	2,096		150 (2001)
Turkey (details)		5,100	19,618	21,259		
Turkmenistan (details)			964	1,090		
Tuvalu (details)		400	580		177 (2007)	
Uganda (details)	105,000	330,600	66,546	95,098		29,601 (2014)
Ukraine (details)	1,000		252	227		
United Arab Emirates (details)		1,400	55,214	38,364		
United Kingdom (details)	5,000 (1985); 7,000 (2020)	15,600 (Note: The source separately identifies 300 on the Channel Islands.)	30,628	47,554		5,021 (2011)
United States (details)	1,500 (1899); 1,200 (1906); 100,000 (1988); 130,000 (1995); 177,647 (2020) (Note: Baháʼí numbers are for the continental states, excluding Alaska, Hawai'i, and territories.)	210,000	753,423	512,864		28,000 (1991); 84,000 (2001); 100,000 (2006)
United States Virgin Islands (details)		360	577			
Uruguay (details)		3,800	7,356	7,385		
Uzbekistan (details)	1,000		708	800		
Vanuatu (details)		160	5,418	3,293		
Venezuela (details)	1,218 (1965); 20,000 (2000)	35,000	141,072	169,811		
Vietnam (details)	200,000 (<1975); 6,000 (2006)	220,000	356,133	388,802		3,000 (2019)
Western Sahara (details)		100	121			
Yemen (details)	250	480	1,000	1,328		
Zambia (details)	4,000 (2017)	16,000	162,443	241,112	3,891 (2015)	
Zimbabwe (details)	1,000 (1971); 20,000 (1985)	14,500	37,077	39,893		35,000 (1995)

== Adherents by continent ==
The following data comes from World Christian Encyclopedia (1st ed., 1982).

Continent	1900	1970	1975	1980
Africa	225	695,094	847,795	1,024,440
East Asia	0	27,307	31,620	36,230
Europe	0	53,810	58,580	63,270
Latin America	0	298,350	376,070	462,100
Northern America	2,800	162,350	206,410	250,470
Oceania	0	29,355	38,640	48,115
South Asia	5,800	1,389,160	1,639,260	1,933,405
USSR	200	4,000	4,300	4,600
World	9,025	2,659,426	3,202,675	3,822,630

The following data comes from World Christian Encyclopedia (2st ed., 2001).

Continent	1900	1970	1990	1995	2000
Africa	225	698,094	1,383,320	1,546,330	1,732,816
Asia	5,900	1,411,530	2,811,995	3,034,140	3,475,167
Europe	210	56,810	106,635	120,275	129,706
Latin America	0	299,350	357,845	763,205	872,757
Northern America	2,800	162,350	628,675	712,335	785,587
Oceania	400	29,215	83,217	97,595	110,387
World	9,535	2,657,349	5,671,687	6,273,880	7,106,420

In "The Baha'i Faith 1957–1988: A Survey of Contemporary Developments" (Religion: 1989), Baháʼí authors Momen and Smith provide the following estimates of the Baháʼís in the world over 3 decades, broken out by cultural areas. They derived numbers from, "calculation of approximate numbers from the number of Bahá'í organizations; extrapolating back from the official figures for the number of individual Bahá'ís provided more recently; estimates provided by informed Bahá'ís; and when the first draft of this paper was completed, a copy was sent to the Department of Statistics in Haifa and the present table incorporates some of the statistical information given in the reply to this, dated 8 July 1988."

Cultural area	1954	1968	1988
Middle East and North Africa	200,000	250,000	300,000
North America, Europe & Anglo-Pacific	10,000	30,000	200,000
South Asia	1,000	300,000	1,900,000
South-east Asia	2,000	200,000	300,000
East Asia		10,000	20,000
Latin America & the Caribbean		100,000	700,000
Africa (sub-Saharan)		200,000	1,000,000
Oceania (excluding Anglo-Pacific)		5,000	70,000
World	213,000	1,095,000	4,490,000

== Other statistics from Baháʼí sources ==
	1928	1949	1968	1986	2001	2006
National Spiritual Assemblies	7	11	81	165	182	179
Local Spiritual Assemblies	102	595	6,840	18,232	11,740	
Countries where the Baháʼí Faith is established: independent countries	36	92		187		191
Localities where Baháʼís reside	573	2315	31,572	>116,000	127,381	
Indigenous tribes, races, and ethnic groups			1,179	>2,100		2,112
Languages into which Baháʼí literature is translated			417			800
Baháʼí Publishing Trusts			9	26	33	

Year	1923	1936	1953	1963	1973	1979	1988	2008
National Spiritual Assemblies	3	10	12	56	113	125	148	184

== See also ==
- History of the Baháʼí Faith
- Spiritual Assembly
- Socioeconomic development and the Baháʼí Faith
- Baháʼí divisions
