= Baháʼí Faith in Chile =

The Baháʼí Faith in Chile begins with references to Chile in Baháʼí literature as early as 1916, with the first Baháʼís visiting as early as 1919. A functioning community was not founded in Chile until 1940 with the beginning of the arrival of coordinated pioneers from the United States finding national Chilean converts and achieved an independent national community in 1963. In 2002 The Bahá'í community of Chile was picked for the establishment of the first Baháʼí Temple of South America which the community is still prosecuting. The US government estimated 6,000 Baháʼís in Chile as of 2007 though the Association of Religion Data Archives (relying mostly on the World Christian Encyclopedia) estimated some 26,000 Baháʼís in 2005.

== ʻAbdu'l-Bahá's Tablets of the Divine Plan ==
ʻAbdu'l-Bahá, the son of the founder of the religion, wrote a series of letters, or tablets, to the followers of the religion in the United States in 1916–1917; these letters were compiled together in the book titled Tablets of the Divine Plan. The sixth of the tablets was the first to mention Latin American regions and was written on April 8, 1916, but was delayed in being presented in the United States until 1919 — after the end of World War I and the Spanish flu. The first actions on the part of Baháʼí community towards Latin America were that of a few individuals who made trips to Mexico and South America near or before this unavailing in 1919, including Mr. and Mrs. Frankland, and Roy C. Wilhelm, and Martha Root. Root's travels, perhaps the first Baháʼí to Chile, began in the summer of 1919 - stopping first in Brazil, then Argentina and Uruguay before setting out to cross the Andes mountains into Chile in winter; she visited Valparaiso and Santiago. The sixth tablet was translated and presented by Mirza Ahmad Sohrab on April 4, 1919, and published in Star of the West magazine on December 12, 1919.

"His Holiness Christ says: Travel ye to the East and to the West of the world and summon the people to the Kingdom of God. Hence the mercy of God must encompass all humanity. Therefore, do ye not think it permissible to leave that region deprived of the breezes of the Morn of Guidance. Consequently, strive as far as ye are able to send to those parts fluent speakers, who are detached from aught else save God, attracted with the fragrances of God, and sanctified and purified from all desires and temptations. ...Guatemala, Honduras, Salvador, Nicaragua, Costa Rica, Panama and the seventh country Belize...The teachers going to those parts must also be familiar with the Spanish language. Attach great importance to the indigenous population of America...Likewise the islands of ... Cuba, Haiti, Puerto Rico, Jamaica, ... Bahama Islands, even the small Watling Island...Haiti and Santo Domingo...the islands of Bermuda... the republics of the continent of South America—Colombia, Ecuador, Peru, Brazil, the Guianas, Bolivia, Chile, Argentina, Uruguay, Paraguay, Venezuela; also the islands to the north, east and west of South America, such as Falkland Islands, the Galapagòs, Juan Fernandez, Tobago and Trinidad...."

Following the release of these tablets and then ʻAbdu'l-Bahá's death in 1921, a few Baháʼís began moving to or at least visiting Latin America. For example Mark Tobey visited Mexico in 1931 during a world trip from Europe through Palestine, the Americas and back to Europe.

== Seven Year Plan and succeeding decades ==
Shoghi Effendi, who was named ʻAbdu'l-Bahá's successor, wrote a cable on May 1, 1936 to the Baháʼí Annual Convention of the United States and Canada, and asked for the systematic implementation of ʻAbdu'l-Bahá's vision to begin. In his cable he wrote:

"Appeal to assembled delegates ponder historic appeal voiced by ʻAbdu'l-Bahá in Tablets of the Divine Plan. Urge earnest deliberation with incoming National Assembly to insure its complete fulfillment. First century of Baháʼí Era drawing to a close. Humanity entering outer fringes most perilous stage its existence. Opportunities of present hour unimaginably precious. Would to God every State within American Republic and every Republic in American continent might ere termination of this glorious century embrace the light of the Faith of Baháʼu'lláh and establish structural basis of His World Order."

Following the May 1st cable, another cable from Shoghi Effendi came on May 19 calling for permanent pioneers to be established in all the countries of Latin America. The Baháʼí National Spiritual Assembly of the United States and Canada was appointed the Inter-America Committee to take charge of the preparations. During the 1937 Baháʼí North American Convention, Shoghi Effendi cabled advising the convention to prolong their deliberations to permit the delegates and the National Assembly to consult on a plan that would enable Baháʼís to go to Latin America as well as to include the completion of the outer structure of the Baháʼí House of Worship in Wilmette, Illinois. In 1937 the First Seven Year Plan (1937–44), which was an international plan designed by Shoghi Effendi, gave the American Baháʼís the goal of establishing the Baháʼí Faith in every country in Latin America. With the spread of American Baháʼís in Latin American, Baháʼí communities and Local Spiritual Assemblies began to form in 1938 across Latin America.

The permanent Chilean Baháʼí community dates from the arrival of Marcia Stewart Atwater, born in 1904 in Pasadena, California, who arrived in Chile on December 7, 1940 when her ship docked at Arica (though written materials of the Baháʼí Faith are known to have been present in Chile though the Theosophical Society previous none had become Baháʼí.). The first Chilean to accept the Baháʼí Faith was 12-year-old Paul Bravo, which was followed by his family becoming Baháʼís. Then in 1943, Chile's first Baháʼí Local Spiritual Assembly was elected. Following this election Atwater went to Punta Arenas, the southernmost city of the world.

In 1943, during the annual Baháʼí convention of the United States, Shoghi Effendi announced a Northern- and Southern- international convention which would include representative from each state and province from the United States and Canada and each republic of Latin America. During this convention, Esteban Canales was the Chilean delegate.

Artemus Lamb, the second Baháʼí pioneer in Chile arrived on October 2, 1944 in Punta Arenas, and thus relieving Atwater from her outpost. In that city, Lina Smithson (known as Lina Gianotti in Chile) became its first Chilean believer in 1945; in 1945 Baháʼís moved from Punta Arenas area to Santiago, Valparaíso and Valdivia.

By 1946, a mixture of pioneers and Chilean citizens increased the number of Baháʼí Local Spiritual Assemblies from fourteen to thirty-seven, of which three had obtained legal incorporation; and the number of localities in which Baháʼís resided had been increased to almost a hundred. The first South American Baháʼí Congress was held in Buenos Aires, Argentina, November, 1946. In 1947 the Baháʼí international teaching committee for South America (CEPSA) was appointed and the first members were Walter Hammond, Rosy Vodanovic, Esteben Canales, Betty Rowe, and Artemus Lamb, all of Chile. At a similar conference for the Central American region a Baháʼí mentioned a campaign had begun. It was explained more in May 1947 that she and others had advertised in major newspapers of several cities along these lines:

We are seeking people of good will to organize a Center of Study and Teaching founded on the following principles (a formulation of Baháʼí teachings). This movement already has affiliated groups established in all the major countries of the world, which function by means of the collective consultation of all their members. Without obligation, you may ask for literature and every kind of information by writing to (address in San Jose).

From this advertising there were enquiries which were sent Baháʼí literature and eventually an assembly was elected. Baháʼís from Chile were interested in the method enough to emulate it. By October 1947 this method was being used in Chile. Lucha G. de Padilla, wife of the former consul-general of Chile to the United States, went to Costa Rica in May 1948 to see the process for herself. This method was still being used up to at least 1966.

The second South American Baháʼí Congress was celebrated in Santiago, Chile, in January, 1948 and was organized and executed by CEPSA with the help of the Local Spiritual Assembly of Santiago. In 1950, the Baháʼí Faith achieved legal recognition in Chile with the formation of an international Regional Spiritual Assembly for South America whose first members were Edmund Miessler of Brazil, Margot Worley of Brazil, Eve Nicklin of Peru, Gayle Woolson of Colombia, Esteban Canales of Paraguay, Mercedes Sanchez of Peru, Dr. Alexander Reid of Chile, Rangvald Taetz of Uruguay, and Manuel Vera of Peru.

Following the election of the Regional Baháʼí Spiritual Assembly of South America in 1950, in 1957 this Assembly was split into two - basically northern/eastern South America with the Republics of Brazil, Peru, Colombia, Ecuador, and Venezuela, in Lima, Peru and one of the western/southern South America with the Republics of Argentina, Chile, Uruguay, Paraguay, and Bolivia in Buenos Aires, Argentina. Chile established its independent Baháʼí National Spiritual Assembly in 1961.

== Recent situation ==
Since its inception the religion has had involvement in socio-economic development beginning by giving greater freedom to women, promulgating the promotion of female education as a priority concern, and that involvement was given practical expression by creating schools, agricultural coops, and clinics. The religion entered a new phase of activity when a message of the Universal House of Justice dated 20 October 1983 was released. Baháʼís were urged to seek out ways, compatible with the Baháʼí teachings, in which they could become involved in the social and economic development of the communities in which they lived. World-wide in 1979 there were 129 officially recognized Baháʼí socio-economic development projects. By 1987, the number of officially recognized development projects had increased to 1482. Following the changes in Chile due to transition to democracy between 1989 and 1991, the Chilean Ministry of Education approved programs for Baháʼí General Basic (Elementary) Education and Secondary Education, and two schools were established by the National Spiritual Assembly — the Elementary School of Faizi, Number 335 and the Elementary School of Dr. Muhajir, Number 499; both schools serve largely Mapuche communities.

Other mentions of the religion included in well-known Chilean Isabel Allende's book The Infinite Plan: A Novel (1991) which states: "Gregory's journey is marked by the contending philosophies of his mother's Baháʼí Faith." By 1994 a radio station was established in Chile to nurture and preserve the local culture by featuring local story-tellers and music recorded at station-sponsored annual indigenous music festivals. During 1994-95 there were two Baháʼí youth conferences. In August 1994 in Talca a youth conference was held were all talks and workshops were prepared and presented by youth to give them opportunities to develop their skills; the conference focused on evaluating the past year's projects and planning for the future. The second national conference, in February 1995, was the culmination of a month-long teaching project undertaken by the youth in sixteen cities of Chile.

In 2000, Chile rose in support of a United Nations human rights resolution about concern over the Baháʼís in Iran as well as taking steps to further document conditions.

=== South American Baháʼí House of Worship ===
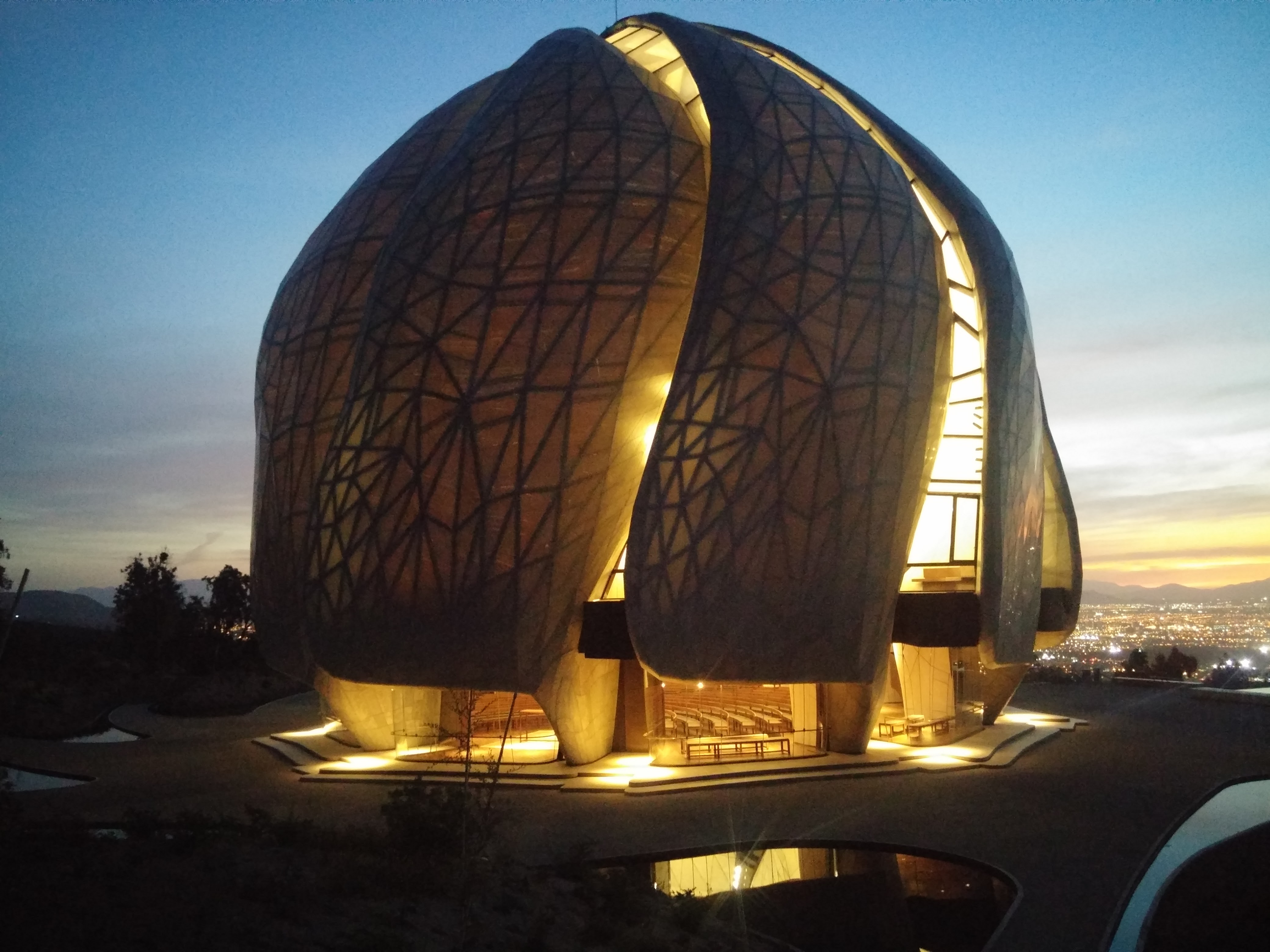
The House of Worship in Santiago, Chile

In late 2002, the National Spiritual Assembly of the Baháʼís of Chile and the Universal House of Justice, the international governing body of the Baháʼís, announced a competition for the design of the first Baháʼí House of Worship for South America, to be built near Santiago though the general decision to have the first temple of South America was set since 1953. The selected design was designed by Siamak Hariri of Toronto, Canada, and fabrication of components began in 2007. Its sides will be composed of translucent panels of alabaster and cast glass. The interior structure will be a lattice structure of steel supporting the inside of the upper dome. The construction completed in October, 2016, with doors opening on October 19, 2016.

=== Chilean Baháʼí artists ===
Kamal Siegel is a musician born in Punta Arenas of American parents; his first album was released in 2005, and one of its songs was featured in a 2007 compilation album produced by Grammy Award-Winner KC Porter. In 1998 Siegel moved to the Seattle area of the United States where he gained experience as a game artist and designer and in 2004 founded his own production and animation company.

Other Chilean Baháʼí artists include musician Rebecca Johnston-Garvin who moved to Chile in 1979, who has produced three CD's, singer/songwriter Dario Cardoso, who in 1991 participated in a Baháʼí music group called Planeta Paz and toured Brasil, Uruguay, Argentina and Paraguay, architect and musician Javier Duhart, and rap duo "New Vision" with Vahid Masrour and Kioumars Balazadeh.

=== Demographics ===
The US government estimated 6,000 Baháʼís in Chile as of 2007 though the Association of Religion Data Archives (relying mostly on the World Christian Encyclopedia) estimated some 26,415 Baháʼís in 2005. Baháʼís claim nearly half of the Chilean Baháʼí community is of the indigenous Mapuche people. According to the 2024 Chilean census, the Bahaʼí community had 2010 members aged 15 or older living in Chile.

== See also ==
- Baháʼí Faith by country
- History of Chile
- Religion in Chile
- World Citizen
- Baháʼí Faith and Native Americans
