= Baháʼí Faith in Angola =

The Baháʼí Faith in Angola begins after ʻAbdu'l-Bahá wrote letters encouraging taking the religion to Africa in 1916. The first Baháʼí pioneered to Angola about 1952. By 1963 there was a Baháʼí Local Spiritual Assembly in Luanda and smaller groups of Baháʼís in other cities. In 1992 the Baháʼís of Angola elected their first National Spiritual Assembly. The Association of Religion Data Archives (relying mostly on the World Christian Encyclopedia) estimated some 2,000 Baháʼís in 2005.

== Early Phase ==
=== ʻAbdu'l-Bahá's Tablets of the Divine Plan ===
ʻAbdu'l-Bahá wrote a series of letters, or tablets, to the followers of the religion in the United States in 1916–1917; these letters were compiled together in the book Tablets of the Divine Plan. The eighth and twelfth of the tablets mentioned Africa and were written on April 19, 1916, and February 15, 1917, respectively. Publication however was delayed in the United States until 1919—after the end of the First World War and the Spanish flu. The tablets were translated and presented by Mirza Ahmad Sohrab on April 4, 1919, and published in Star of the West magazine on December 12, 1919. ʻAbdu'l-Bahá mentions Baháʼís traveling "...especially from America to Europe, Africa, Asia and Australia, and travel through Japan and China. Likewise, from Germany teachers and believers may travel to the continents of America, Africa, Japan and China; in brief, they may travel through all the continents and islands of the globe" and "...the anthem of the oneness of the world of humanity may confer a new life upon all the children of men, and the tabernacle of universal peace be pitched on the apex of America; thus Europe and Africa may become vivified with the breaths of the Holy Spirit, this world may become another world, the body politic may attain to a new exhilaration...."

=== Establishment of the community ===
By early 1952, a Baháʼí pioneer had arrived in Angola. In 1953 Shoghi Effendi, head of the religion after the death of ʻAbdu'l-Bahá, planned an international teaching plan termed the Ten Year Crusade. During the plan pioneers moved to many countries including Angola from places like East Timor. This was during a period of wide scale growth in the religion across Sub-Saharan Africa near the end of the period of Colonisation of Africa.

In April 1956 the Baháʼí Faith was present in small numbers across 15 countries of southern Africa. To administer these communities a regional National Spiritual Assembly was elected in South West Africa to cover them. An election of a Local Spiritual Assembly in Luanda was attempted in 1954 and successfully in 1956. By 1963 an assembly was known in Luanda and smaller groups of Baháʼís were in Malange and Nova Gaia.

Following the death of Shoghi Effendi, the elected Universal House of Justice was head of the religion and began to re-organized the Baháʼí communities of Africa, including Angola, by splitting off national communities to form their own National Assemblies from 1964 though the 1990s. In 1964 one of the interim regional national assemblies—of South and West Africa—had some 3,600 Baháʼís and 36 local assemblies. From 1977 to 1992 Angola and Mozambique shared a regional national assembly. In 1992 the Baháʼís of Angola elected their first National Spiritual Assembly, witnessed by Counsellour Rolf von Czekus, representing the Universal House of Justice at the proceedings.

== Modern community ==
Since its inception the religion has had involvement in socio-economic development beginning by giving greater freedom to women, promulgating the promotion of female education as a priority concern, and that involvement was given practical expression by creating schools, agricultural coops, and clinics. The religion entered a new phase of activity when a message of the Universal House of Justice dated 20 October 1983 was released. Baháʼís were urged to seek out ways, compatible with the Baháʼí teachings, in which they could become involved in the social and economic development of the communities in which they lived. World-wide in 1979 there were 129 officially recognized Baháʼí socio-economic development projects. By 1987, the number of officially recognized development projects had increased to 1482. The Angolan Baháʼís at the local Centre in Luanda hosted an interfaith prayer gathering to mark the opening of the Millennium World Peace Summit of Religious and Spiritual Leaders, which was held at the United Nations August 2000. Nine Baháʼís from Angola were among the thousand who gathered for a regional conference called for by the Universal House of Justice to be held in Lubumbashi, Congo, in November 2008. Others traveled to the regional conference held in Johannesburg South Africa.

=== Demographics ===
The Association of Religion Data Archives (relying mostly on the World Christian Encyclopedia) estimated some 2,051 Baháʼís in 2005.

== See also ==
- Religion in Angola
- History of Angola
