= Baháʼí Faith in Portugal =

The Baháʼí Faith in Portugal comes after the first mention of Portugal in Baháʼí literature when ʻAbdu'l-Bahá mentioned it as a place to take the religion to in 1916. The first Baháʼí visitor to Portugal was in 1926. Its first Baháʼí Local Spiritual Assembly was elected in Lisbon in 1946. In 1962 the Portuguese Baháʼís elected their first National Spiritual Assembly. In 1963 there were nine assemblies. According to recent counts there are close to some 2000 members of the Baháʼí Faith in 2005 according to the Association of Religion Data Archives (relying on World Christian Encyclopedia).

== Early phase ==
=== ʻAbdu'l-Bahá's Tablets of the Divine Plan ===
In the history of the Baháʼí Faith the first mentions of Portugal start in the twentieth century. ʻAbdu'l-Bahá, the son of the founder of the religion, wrote a series of letters, or tablets, to the followers of the religion in the United States in 1916-1917; these letters were compiled together in the book titled Tablets of the Divine Plan. The seventh of the tablets was the first to mention several countries in Europe including beyond where ʻAbdu'l-Bahá had visited in 1911-12. Written on April 11, 1916, it was delayed in being presented in the United States until 1919 — after the end of World War I and the Spanish flu. The seventh tablet was translated and presented by Mirza Ahmad Sohrab on April 4, 1919, and published in Star of the West magazine on December 12, 1919.

"In all the countries of the world the longing for universal peace is taking possession of the consciousness of men. … A most wonderful state of receptivity is being realized.… Therefore, O ye believers of God! Show ye an effort and after this war spread ye the synopsis of the divine teachings in the British Isles, France, Germany, Austria-Hungary, Russia, Italy, Spain, Belgium, Switzerland, Norway, Sweden, Denmark, Holland, Portugal, Rumania, Serbia, Montenegro, Bulgaria, Greece, Andorra, Liechtenstein, Luxembourg, Monaco, San Marino, Balearic Isles, Corsica, Sardinia, Sicily, Crete, Malta, Iceland, Faroe Islands, Shetland Islands, Hebrides and Orkney Islands."

=== First contact ===
Martha Root was an early traveler of the religion to visit Portugal in between 1923 and 1933. It is known that two Baháʼís were interviewed by the newspapers Diario de Noticias and Diario de Lisboa and gave other talks on the religion in 1926.

In 1946 the Baháʼí National Spiritual Assembly of the United States formed the Baháʼí European Teaching Committee to teach the religion in Europe. This endeavour oversaw the arrival of a number of Baháʼí pioneers. Its first Baháʼí Local Spiritual Assembly was elected in 1946 in Lisbon. Charlotte Stirratt was a pioneer who had moved to Lisbon, by November 1948.

== Growth ==
In September 1951 the first Iberian conference took place with nine native Baháʼís and other pioneers who had attended the Fourth European Teaching Conference – recommendations from the consultation included exchanging updated information and further coordination between the communities, and to send contributions for the final work on the Shrine of the Báb.

In 1953 Shoghi Effendi, head of the religion after the death of ʻAbdu'l-Bahá, planned an international teaching plan termed the Ten Year Crusade. During the plan pioneers moved from Portugal colonies including Angola and East Timor from 1954.

In 1957 Portugal and Spain formed a regional National Spiritual Assembly. The 1957 convention was witnessed by Charles Wolcott as a representative of Shoghi Effendi. In 1962 each formed their own independent National Spiritual Assembly. In 1963 the delegates to the national convention was set at 19. In 1963, the members of the national assemblies of the world were the delegates to elect the Universal House of Justice for the first time - the members of the assembly of Portugal that participated were Angelo da Silva Carneiro, Mr. Mansour Masrour, Sara Tiffon Ramonet, Hilda Xavier Rodrigues, Carlos Salomao, Carl Scherer, Juliao Serrano, Celestino M. Silva and Richard Walters.

In 1963 the community of Baháʼís was organized into Assemblies, groups between 1 and 9 and isolated Baháʼís as follows:

| Assemblies | Almada | Espinho | Faro | Lisbon | Oeiras/Amadora | Portimão | Porto | Sintra | Trafaria |
| Groups between 1 and 9 adults | Barreiro | Cascais | Charneca | | | | | | |
| Isolated Baháʼís | Beja | Costa da Caparica | Monte da Caparica | Seixal/Amora | | | | | |

Despite this growth the government of Portugal actively opposed the development of the religion until liberalized following the Carnation Revolution of 1974 and the writing of the Portuguese Constitution of 1976.

In 1987 the Portuguese community had 25 Local Spiritual Assemblies - more per capita than neighbouring Spain.

The Portuguese Baháʼí Summer Schools are a series of annual events held in Portugal, as part of the "Summer School" concept of Baháʼí school. The Portuguese Baháʼí Summer Schools modestly emerged in the 60's, and have been growing in popularity and scope since. In 2009, the event hosted over 200 participants from all 5 continents, and counted with Ali Nakhjavani and Violette Nakhjavani, as well as Glenford Mitchell, as main speakers.

== Modern community ==
There has been news coverage of the development of the Baháʼí Terraced gardens in Haifa. Recent counts show close to some 1,995 members of the Baháʼí Faith in 2005 according to the Association of Religion Data Archives (relying on World Christian Encyclopedia). In 2007 the Baháʼís of Portugal contributed to a religious discussion on society with the theme "The Baha'i faith and equal opportunities".

== See also ==
- History of Portugal
- Religion in Portugal
