= Baháʼí Faith in Burundi =

The Bahá’í Faith in Burundi begins after 1916 with a mention by ‘Abdu'l-Bahá, then head of the religion, that Bahá’ís should take the religion to the regions of Africa. The first specific mention of Burundi (Urundi) was in May 1953 suggesting the expanding community of the Bahá’í Faith in Uganda look at sending Bahá’í pioneers to neighboring areas like Burundi as part of a specific plan of action. The first settlers of the religion arrived in the region by June. By 1963 there were three Bahá’í Local Spiritual Assemblies in Burundi-Ruanda. Through succeeding organizations of the countries in the region, the National Spiritual Assembly of Burundi was first formed in 1969 but was successively dissolved and reformed a number of times - most recently reforming in 2011. Even though the religion was banned for a time, and the country torn by wars, the religion grew so that in 2005 the Association of Religion Data Archives (relying on World Christian Encyclopedia) estimated just about 6,800 Baháʼís in Burundi.

== Early days ==
=== ʻAbdu'l-Bahá's Tablets of the Divine Plan ===
ʻAbdu'l-Bahá wrote a series of letters, or tablets, to the followers of the religion in the United States in 1916–1917; these letters were compiled together in the book titled Tablets of the Divine Plan. Three of the tablets mentioned taking the Baháʼí Faith to Africa, but was delayed in being presented in the United States until 1919 — after the end of World War I and the Spanish flu. These tablets were translated and presented by Mirza Ahmad Sohrab on April 4, 1919, and published in Star of the West magazine on December 12, 1919. One tablet says in part:

The intention of the teacher must be pure, his heart independent, his spirit attracted, his thought at peace, his resolution firm, his magnanimity exalted and in the love of God a shining torch. ... Consequently, a number of souls may arise … and hasten to all parts of the world, especially from America to Europe, Africa, Asia.

[and also offers a prayer that begins]:

O God, my God! Thou seest how black darkness is enshrouding all regions, how all countries are burning with the flame of dissension, and the fire of war and carnage is blazing throughout the East and the West. Blood is flowing, corpses bestrew the ground, and severed heads are fallen on the dust of the battlefield. O Lord! Have pity ...

The first specific mention of "Urundi" was from a telegram of Shoghi Effendi in May 1953, while he was head of the religion, in which he is suggesting the expanding community of the Baháʼí Faith in Uganda and other areas look at sending pioneering Bahá’í to neighboring areas like Burundi during the campaign called the Ten Year Crusade during the period when Burundi was part of Ruanda-Urundi.

=== Beginnings ===
The first Baháʼí to travel through the region may have been Marthe Molitor c. 1947 after joining the religion in Belgium. The first settlers of the religion arrived in the region by June when Mary and Reginald (Rex) Collison of the United States and Dunduzu Chisiza, a young Baháʼí from Malawi (then Nyasaland), arrived in Ruanda-Urundi thus earning the title Knights of Baháʼu'lláh. The first local Bahá’í in Rwanda was Selemani Bin Kimbulu. The Collisons had moved from Uganda and struggled with the limitation of being English-speakers in a country dominated by French. By 1956–1957 there were some thirty Bahá’ís both native and pioneering noted in the region and the area was organized under a regional national assembly of the Baháʼís of Central and East Africa to which delegates were sent from Burundi. The first Baháʼí Local Spiritual Assembly of the Baha'is of Usumbura (later renamed Bujumbura), formed on April 21, 1957. Native Baháʼís, about twenty in number, maintained the assembly status through 1959 and were aided then to acquire a registration with local government and a local center for community activities. Molisso Michel traveled through the region from Congo and was asked to speak to a significant audience in addition to a small tour of villages. In 1960 there are notes of many conversions.

== Growth ==
Wide-scale growth in the religion across Sub-Saharan Africa was observed to begin in the 1950s and extend in the 1960s. In Burundi-Ruanda by 1963 there were three Baháʼí Local Spiritual Assemblies. In these early days converts were among the nearby Congolese who had become Baháʼís in Rwanda and Burundi who moved back to their home provinces. In 1966, Dr. and Mrs. Ta'eed of Iran arrived, along with Jackton Kayemba of Kenya, though Kayemba returned to Kenya in 1971.

Hand of the Cause, the title of one serving in a position of international distinction in the religion, Enoch Olinga, represented the Universal House of Justice for the 1969 election of the National Spiritual Assembly of the Baháʼís of Burundi and Rwanda with its seat in Bujumbura. With the independence of Burundi and Rwanda, the national assembly was reformed in 1972 for each country. Hand of the Cause, Rúhíyyih Khanum visited Burundi around 1972–1973.

=== Restricted and freedom ===
However, as part of a sweep across several Sub-Saharan countries, the Baháʼí Faith was banned in the 1970s in several countries: Burundi, 1974; Mali 1976; Uganda, 1977; Congo, 1978; Niger, 1978.

This was principally the result of a campaign by a number of Arab countries. Since these countries were also by this time providers of development aid, this overt attack on the Baha'is was supported by covert moves such as linking the aid money to a particular country to the action that it took against the Baha'is. This was partially successful and a number of countries did ban the Baha'is for a time. However, the Baha'is were able to demonstrate to these governments that they were not agents of Zionism nor anti-Islamic. ...

While the national organization of the Baháʼís was disbanded local and regional administration continued. In 1980 the Baháʼí group of Gitega held a meeting with some 300 college students on the religion. A Youth Institute, opportunities for intensive study of the Baháʼí Faith ranging from one day to several weeks, was held in nearby Zambia, which included Burundi youth completed a four-week course in 1994.

American Cynthia Shepard Perry became a Baháʼí about 1969. She eventually worked as an African American in foreign policy as she was the United States Ambassador to Burundi (1989–1993) during the first Bush administration but she did not participate in formal Baháʼí activities due to her responsibilities.

The national organization later reformed in combination with Rwanda. In the face of the rising tensions of the Rwandan Civil War the national assembly of Burundi lapsed in 1994 followed by the Rwandan side in 1996. Along the way, regional Baháʼí centers in Bubanza, Carama, and Cibitoke were destroyed. However, the Burundi assembly was reformed in 2011 though its national presence was noted in 2003 and it had a national center in Nyakabiga, Bujumbura by 2004.

== Modern community ==
Since its inception the religion has had involvement in socio-economic development beginning by giving greater freedom to women, promulgating the promotion of female education as a priority concern, and that involvement was given practical expression by creating schools, agricultural coops, and clinics. The religion entered a new phase of activity when a message of the Universal House of Justice dated 20 October 1983 was released. Baháʼís were urged to seek out ways, compatible with the Baháʼí teachings, in which they could become involved in the social and economic development of the communities in which they lived. Worldwide in 1979 there were 129 officially recognized Baháʼí socio-economic development projects. By 1987, the number of officially recognized development projects had increased to 1482. Since the genocide and war, the religion has been involved in resolving tribal tensions based on its teachings of principle of the oneness of humanity. However conditions in Burundi and neighboring areas were extremely violent: there was the 1993 ethnic violence in Burundi, and the Burundian Civil War among others. Despite this and the relatively small community a few activities were undertaken. A group of 149 Baháʼí youth from Burundi, the Democratic Republic of the Congo, Rwanda, and Uganda gathered at the national center in Burundi between 17 and 21 August 2006. They focused on the potential of youth to contribute to the positive transformation of their societies along these lines. A government minister addressed the attendees and two radio journalists also did interviews. Regional conferences around the world were called for by the Universal House of Justice 20 October 2008 to celebrate recent achievements in grassroots community-building and to plan their next steps in organizing in their home areas. The closest one to Burundi was in Uvira and some 13 people were able to make it from Burundi despite persistent regional violence.

Pascal Akimana grew up in Burundi under extreme violent conditions, both within his family and out. He provides an historical perspective on the situation both in Burundi and Rwanda in a podcast interview done in 2011.

=== Demographics ===
The Association of Religion Data Archives (relying on World Christian Encyclopedia) 2005 estimates just about 6,800 Baháʼís in Burundi.
