= Baháʼí Faith in the Democratic Republic of the Congo =

The Baháʼí Faith in the Democratic Republic of the Congo begins after ʻAbdu'l-Bahá wrote letters encouraging taking the religion to Africa in 1916. The first Baháʼí to settle in the country came in 1953 from Uganda. The first Baháʼí Local Spiritual Assembly of the country was elected in 1957. By 1963 there were 143 local assemblies in Congo. Even though the religion was temporarily banned, and the country torn by wars, the religion grew so that in 2003 there were some 541 assemblies. The Association of Religion Data Archives (relying mostly on the World Christian Encyclopedia) estimated some 290,900 Baháʼís in 2005.

== Early Phase ==
=== ʻAbdu'l-Bahá's Tablets of the Divine Plan ===
ʻAbdu'l-Bahá wrote a series of letters, or tablets, to the followers of the religion in the United States in 1916-1917; these letters were compiled together in the book Tablets of the Divine Plan. The eighth and twelfth of the tablets mentioned Africa and were written on April 19, 1916 and February 15, 1917, respectively. Publication however was delayed in the United States until 1919—after the end of the First World War and the Spanish flu. The tablets were translated and presented by Mirza Ahmad Sohrab on April 4, 1919, and published in Star of the West magazine on December 12, 1919. ʻAbdu'l-Bahá mentions Baháʼís traveling "...especially from America to Europe, Africa, Asia and Australia, and travel through Japan and China. Likewise, from Germany teachers and believers may travel to the continents of America, Africa, Japan and China; in brief, they may travel through all the continents and islands of the globe" and " ...the anthem of the oneness of the world of humanity may confer a new life upon all the children of men, and the tabernacle of universal peace be pitched on the apex of America; thus Europe and Africa may become vivified with the breaths of the Holy Spirit, this world may become another world, the body politic may attain to a new exhilaration...."

Shoghi Effendi, head of the religion after the death of ʻAbdu'l-Bahá, and his wife, Rúhíyyih Khanum may have been the first Baháʼís to visit Congo when they drove across the eastern part of the country in 1940.

=== Establishment of the community ===
In 1953 Shoghi Effendi planned an international teaching plan termed the Ten Year Crusade. This was during a period of wide scale growth in the religion across Sub-Saharan Africa near the end of the period of Colonisation of Africa. Before 1953, colonial authorities of what was then the Belgian Congo did not permit the promotion of religion by Baháʼí pioneers however Ali Nakhjavani and his wife, Violette, driving across Africa from the growing Baháʼí community in Uganda, were able to take a Ugandan Baháʼí Samson Mungongo to the city of Kamina where he settled and began to teach the religion while suffering hostility, suspiciousness and superstition. The first converts were Louis Selemani, Remy Kalonji, and Valerien Mukendi - they, with a dozen pioneers from Europe, North America and other parts of Africa, and Congolese who had become Baháʼís in Rwanda and Burundi who moved back to their home provinces - all these formed the basis of the quickly growing community.

In April 1956 the Baháʼí Faith was present in small numbers across countries of middle Africa. To administer these communities a regional National Spiritual Assembly was elected in Central and East Africa to cover them. The first Local Spiritual Assembly was elected in 1957.

=== Growth and opposition ===
The Eastern Belgian Congo, as part of the experience across central Africa west to east and to the south began to have qualities of mass conversion. In the areas under the jurisdiction of the regional National Assembly of South and West Africa, south of Congo, there was a gain of over sixty percent in the total number of adherents of the Faith just in 1959, and rates like this continued for a few more years. Pygmies in Congo were among the converts in 1961, one of whom was a delegate to the election of the regional assembly in 1962. Circa 1961 Baháʼí sources indicate about 1000 members. By the spring of 1962 there was widespread knowledge of many more Baháʼís and about November 1962 the National Spiritual Assembly of Central and West Africa was claiming over 14,000 people had converted to the religion. By the end of 1963 local assemblies were in 143 localities. The majority of growth happened in the province of Kivu Major growth was announced as early as 1962. Later some also occurred in the province of Shaba in the 1970s when the community grew from about 5 individuals to enough to support 25 local assemblies in 1973.

Following the death of Shoghi Effendi, the elected Universal House of Justice was head of the religion and began to re-organized the Baháʼí communities of Africa by splitting off national communities to form their own National Assemblies from 1967 though the 1990s. From January to March 1970 Hand of the Cause Rúhíyyih Khanum crossed Africa from east to west visiting many of these country's communities including the Congo, meeting with individuals and institutions both Baháʼí and civic. The first National Spiritual Assembly of Zaire (current name of the country) formed in 1970 during this trip. Rúhíyyih Khanum's second visit was in January 1972 and traveled almost 3,000 miles through central and southern Zaire by river boat and automobile.

==== Kivu ====
Members of the Baháʼí Faith first entered the Province of Kivu about November 1959 from Uganda where the religion had grown quickly. Whole villages turned out to listen to presentations on the religion and growth continued through the 1960s. After visiting Zaire a couple times in the 1970s a third visit by Rúhíyyih Khanum in late 1972 focused on the province of Kivu where the majority of Baháʼís of Zaire were to be found - some 600 assemblies being elected across some 30,000 Baháʼís in 1972 (compared to about 3000 Baháʼís in the rest of the Congo at the same time.) In fact most of these Baháʼís in Kivu were in the southern half of the province, or modern day South Kivu. In the Kivu region in a five-year period in the 1970s there were 9 women's conferences under the authority of assemblies or committees of assemblies, institutes were developed to train over 100 teachers for Baháʼí schools that were sanctioned by the government educational bureau.

==== Restricted and freedom ====
However, as part of a sweep across several Sub-Saharan countries, the Baháʼí Faith was banned in the 1970s in several countries: Burundi, 1974; Mali 1976; Uganda 1977; Congo, 1978; Niger, 1978.

"This was principally the result of a campaign by a number of Arab countries. Since these countries were also by this time providers of development aid, this overt attack on the Baha'is was supported by covert moves such as linking the aid money to a particular country to the action that it took against the Baha'is. This was partially successful and a number of countries did ban the Baha'is for a time. However, the Baha'is were able to demonstrate to these governments that they were not agents of Zionism nor anti-Islamic and succeeded in having the ban reversed in all of these countries except Niger." See also Allegations of Baháʼí involvement with other powers

While the national organization of the Baháʼís was disbanded local and regional administration continued. In 1982 the Baháʼí Administrative Committee for Central South Zaire in Lubumbashi published a work commemorating Bahíyyih Khánum. Baháʼí pioneers continued to arrive. In 1983 a local TV program in Kivu featured a presentation on the religion was followed up by a showing of the filmThe Green Light Expedition about Rúhíyyih Khanum's trip up the Amazon River. After some years of service and growth the Baháʼí community was able to re-elect its National Assembly in 1987.

Since its inception the religion has had involvement in socio-economic development beginning by giving greater freedom to women, promulgating the promotion of female education as a priority concern, and that involvement was given practical expression by creating schools, agricultural coops, and clinics. The religion entered a new phase of activity when a message of the Universal House of Justice dated 20 October 1983 was released. Baháʼís were urged to seek out ways, compatible with the Baháʼí teachings, in which they could become involved in the social and economic development of the communities in which they lived. World-wide in 1979 there were 129 officially recognized Baháʼí socio-economic development projects. By 1987, the number of officially recognized development projects had increased to 1482. In Zaire in 1983 a tutorial school in Bangwade, Upper Zaire was founded. A survey of projects in 1985 found: agriculture project and literacy center, Kawayongo under its local assembly, educational centers emphasizing functional literacy training for children and adults, augmented by health education and instruction on improving agricultural productivity, a program providing training in nutrition and preventive medicine in NE Zaire, a literacy training program in Goma, a project among the Pygmies to improve literacy and numeracy, health care and agriculture, a teacher training center in northeastern Zaire for French speaking Baháʼí teachers for children's classes, pre-schools and tutorial schools, a training program for the Baha'is to increase agricultural productivity and a project where three senior students from the University of Zaire trained in rural development would spend four months assessing community needs and teaching modern methods of animal keeping, the use of improved seeds, fish culture, and disease prevention methods. In 1986 the provincial governor visited a school project among the Baháʼí Pygmies. By 1987 the Baháʼís organized the Regional Committee for Social and Economic Development under the national assembly for the region of Kivu (using the acronym CREDESE). One hundred and two learning centers were reported in October 1987 operating under CREDESE. There were 2,500 participants across Kivu. Women and girls comprised 73 percent of the students, and 27 percent were not members of the Baháʼí Faith. CREDESE was based on work from a Baháʼí Kenyan and Tanzanian project. In 1989 Baháʼís engaged in a study reviewing the effect of the religion in the prospects of fighting the growth of AIDS in Kinshasa.

== Modern community ==
Having survived legal proscription, and periods of war, the Second Congo War prevented the national institution from meeting from 1998 to 2003. The Baháʼís have continued to develop internal and external projects. The Congo Baha'i Youth Choir sang at a devotional program at the base of the Terraces on Mount Carmel. It later evolved into the Celebration! Congo Choir which performed at The Kennedy Center in 2005. In 2000 some Baháʼís studied the relationship between the Baháʼí teachings and conservation efforts in the Congo. In 2012 the Universal House of Justice announced plans to build two national Baháʼí Houses of Worship aside from the continental ones. One of these was for the Democratic Republic of Congo.

=== Demographics ===
World Christian Encyclopedia estimated in 2000 there were 224,000 Baháʼís in the Congo. Association of Religion Data Archives estimated in 2001 that there were 0.4%, or about 250,000 Baháʼís. In 2003 there were some 541 assemblies. For many years the community was mostly male - but more recently about one third of Baháʼís are women. By 2005 the Association of Religion Data Archives revised their estimated to some 290,899 Baháʼís.

== See also ==
- Religion in the Democratic Republic of the Congo
- History of Democratic Republic of the Congo
