= Baháʼí Faith in Madagascar =

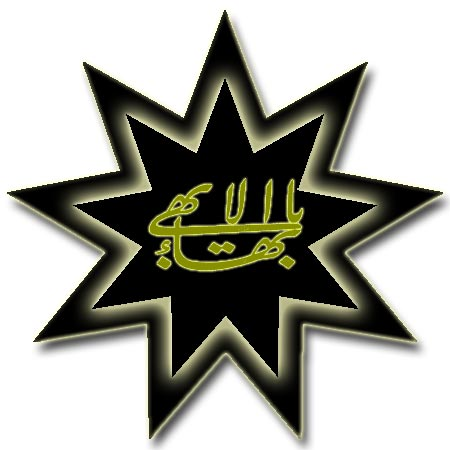
Baha'i symbol

There is a small community of Baháʼís in Madagascar, dating back to 1953.

== Overview ==
The Baháʼí Faith in Madagascar begins with the mention by ʻAbdu'l-Bahá, then head of the religion, who asked the followers of the Baháʼí Faith to travel to Madagascar. The first Baháʼí to pioneer to Madagascar arrived in 1953 and following native converts the first Baháʼí Local Spiritual Assembly was elected in 1955. By 1963 in addition to the one assembly there were groups of Baháʼís living in four other locations. In late July 1967 Rúhíyyih Khanum became the first Hand of the Cause to visit the country. In 1972 the Malagasy Baháʼís gathered to elect the first National Spiritual Assembly of the Baháʼís of Madagascar. By 2003 there were 33 local assemblies and the Association of Religion Data Archives in 2005 estimated there were about 17,900 Baháʼís in the country.

== Early history ==
Though a Baháʼí was in nearby Mauritius in 1910 the first mention of Madagascar in the literature of the Baháʼí Faith was in a series of letters, or tablets, to the followers of the religion in the United States and Canada in 1916-1917 by ʻAbdu'l-Bahá, then head of the religion, who asked the followers of the religion to travel to regions of Africa; these letters were compiled together in the book titled Tablets of the Divine Plan. The publication was delayed until 1919 in Star of the West magazine on December 12, 1919. after the end of World War I and the Spanish flu.

O that I could travel, even though on foot and in the utmost poverty, to these regions, and, raising the call of Yá Baháʼu'l-Abhá in cities, villages, mountains, deserts and oceans, promote the divine teachings! This, alas, I cannot do. How intensely I deplore it! Please God, ye may achieve it.…. Similarly, if possible, they should travel to the continent of Africa, (islands like) Mauritius, etc., and in those countries summon the people to the Kingdom of God and raise the cry of Yá Baháʼu'l-Abhá! They must also upraise the flag of the oneness of the world of humanity in the island of Madagascar.

In 1953 Shoghi Effendi, head of the religion after the death of ʻAbdu'l-Bahá, planned an international teaching plan to systematically implement the goals outlined termed the Ten Year Crusade. The first Baháʼí to pioneer to Madagascar arrived in 1953 when Meherangiz Munsiff, an Asian Indian arrived from Britain. She was able to stay through the hospitality of a local Muslim family and later with the Robert family, of Tananarive (now Antananarivo), who were among the first to become Baháʼís in Madagascar and who later played an outstanding role in the history of the religion here. Suffering ill health, Munsiff left in January 1954 a day after Danile Randrianarivo, 29, joined the religion, becoming the first Malagasy Baháʼí. Jalal Nakhjavani, brother of Ali Nakhjavani, was elected to the first National Spiritual Assembly of Central and East Africa in 1954. It was at this time that he made extensive teaching trips visiting the islands of Zanzibar, Madagascar, Mauritius, Reunion and the Comoro Islands. In 1955 the first Assembly of Madagagar was elected. By May 1955 five introductory pamphlets on the religion were published by the British Baha'i Publishing Trust in the Malagasy language. In April 1956 the religion was present in small numbers across 15 countries of southern Africa including islands. To administer the Baháʼí communities across southern Africa a regional governing body was elected based in South Africa to cover them all called the National Spiritual Assembly of the Baháʼís of South & West Africa in 1956.

== Growth ==
In March 1960 the islands of Mauritius and Madagascar were swept by cyclone Carol. In both places some of the Baháʼís lost their homes, but it is reported they still kept the Nineteen Day Fast and to hold their meetings, often in the open air. One community in Madagascar held a Nineteen Day Feast during the cyclone, with only three absentees. In June Madagascar gained independence from France.

By 1963 there was still one Baháʼí assembly in the country - in Antananarivo - but groups of Baháʼís lived in Ambohimanga, Juan de Nova Island, Mangatany, Nosy Be Island.

In 1966 Arthur J. Gustave Ruggoo pioneered to the Seychelles for several years but occasionally he would undertake special projects promulgating the religion in Réunion and Madagascar.

In late July 1967 Hand of the Cause Rúhíyyih Khanum, the first to visit Madagascar spent several days there as part of a trip through the Islands of the Indian Ocean basin. Counter to most of her trips she spent the whole period in the city - Tananarive, the capital, because of the 10 days she spent in Madagascar she was taking bed rest for five days. Nevertheless, of her five active days she spoke at nine gatherings.

In 1969 a youth committee was organized and operating in the country. In July 1970 Hand of the Cause Rahmatu'lláh Muhájir visited the island consulting with its institutions and participating in events.

In 1972 the first national convention was gathered to elect the first National Spiritual Assembly of the Baháʼís of Madagascar and Hand of the Cause Rahmatu'lláh Muhájir represented the Universal House of Justice at the proceedings.

In March 1977 a regional conference on the progress of the religion on the island was held in Manakara.

A Baháʼí refugee from the Persecution of Baháʼís in Iran, Martha Sobhani, left Iran in 1978. She moved to Madagascar to work with Baháʼí youth and fell in love with her future husband, a native of Mauritius. In November 1979, the Baháʼís of Tananarive hosted a conference in celebration of Universal Children's Day. The proceedings were chaired by an 11-year-old pre-youth. Long time Baháʼí Seewoosumbur Jeehoba Appa of Mauritius died in 1981 when he accompanied Continental Counsellor Shídán Fath-i-Aʻzam to Madagascar. In Sept-Oct 1983 twenty-one Malagasy Baháʼí volunteers took part in trips following three regional institutes on the religion.

== Multiplication of involvements ==
Since its inception the religion has had involvement in socio-economic development beginning by giving greater freedom to women, promulgating the promotion of female education as a priority concern, and that involvement was given practical expression by creating schools, agricultural coops, and clinics. The religion entered a new phase of activity when a message of the Universal House of Justice dated 20 October 1983 was released. Baháʼís were urged to seek out ways, compatible with the Baháʼí teachings, in which they could become involved in the social and economic development of the communities in which they lived. Worldwide in 1979 there were 129 officially recognized Baháʼí socio-economic development projects. By 1987, the number of officially recognized development projects had increased to 1482.

On September 10–15, 1986 Baháʼí youth participated in a national Youth Fair in Antananarivo and won first prize for their display and second prize for their musical event at this fair, whose theme was "Youth, Peace and Development." From April 1989 Baháʼís in several communities organized a campaign to engage the awareness of governmental and neighborhood leaders with the religion. At these meetings books were presented and the Baháʼís described ways they had engaged in socio-economic development projects and asked what more they could do. Displays on the religion were set up and invitations were sent out for neighbors to attend prayer meetings at local Baháʼí centers. These events resulted in some 700 people joining the religion in a year's time.

== Modern community ==
At the 2003 50th anniversary of the arrival of the religion on the island celebrations were held and two ministers from the Malagasy government gave speeches praising the religion for its teachings of universal unity and peace. The media covered the events. Several newspapers published articles about the events, and the national television channel covered the closing ceremony.

=== Demographics ===
By 2003 there were 33 local assemblies.

The Association of Religion Data Archives in 2020 estimated that 0.09% of the national population were Baháʼís.

== See also ==
- History of Madagascar
- Religion in Madagascar
