= Baháʼí Faith in Zimbabwe =

In 1916-1917 a series of letters by ʻAbdu'l-Bahá, then head of the religion, asked the followers of the religion to take the religion to regions of Africa; these letters were compiled together in the book titled Tablets of the Divine Plan. In 1929 Shoghi Effendi, then Guardian of the religion, was the first Baháʼí to visit the area. In 1953 several Baháʼís settled in what was then South Rhodesia as pioneers. Along with indigenous conversions in 1955 the Baháʼís formed the first Baháʼí Local Spiritual Assembly was formed in Harare (then-named Salisbury). By the end of 1963 there were 9 assemblies and more smaller groups and isolated members of the religion. While still a colony of the United Kingdom, the Baháʼís nevertheless organized a separate National Spiritual Assembly in 1964. Though Rhodesia declared independence in 1965, succeeding political developments and wars changed the status of the country and the National Assembly was reformed and has continued since 1970 while Zimbabwe regained independence in 1980. By 2003, the 50th anniversary of the Baháʼís in Zimbabwe, a year of events across the country culminated with a conference of Baháʼís from all provinces of Zimbabwe and nine countries. There were 43 local spiritual assemblies in 2003.

== Early phase ==
In a series of letters, or tablets, to the followers of the religion in the United States and Canada in 1916-1917 by ʻAbdu'l-Bahá, then head of the religion, asked the followers of the religion to take the religion to regions of Africa; these letters were compiled together in the book titled Tablets of the Divine Plan. The publication was delayed until 1919 in Star of the West magazine on December 12, 1919 after the end of World War I and the Spanish flu.

In 1929 Shoghi Effendi, then Guardian of the religion, was the first Baháʼí to visit the area and then came again with his wife, Rúhíyyih Khanum, in 1940–1. They visited the Victoria Falls, Matopos, and Bulawayo.

Early in 1953 Izzat'u'llah Zahrai from Iran attempted to settle in what was then South Rhodesia but his application for residency was rejected. Along with Zahrai, Claire Gung, Eyneddin and Tahirih Ala'i, (some from the United Kingdom), and Dr. Kenneth and Mrs. Roberta Christian, American Baháʼí pioneers, were each credited with being Knights of Baháʼu'lláh for Southern Rhodesia and were under strict instructions by the Guardian to attempt to spread the religion among the indigenous peoples, not the settlers. However the Christians knew Sylvia and "Sue" (Salvator) Benatar, who though Sephardic Jews, became Baháʼís after the Christians left Zimbabwe when they came in contact with Larry and Carol Hautz who were succeeding pioneers. Later Mrs. Benatar performed with Norman Bailey. The Hautz' established a motel, service station, and a snake farm for venom on the Bulawayo road just outside Harare. The school was initially for the 20 indigenous children of the staff, but it eventually expanded to a total enrollment of 400.

The first indigenous person to accept the Faith was Morton Ndovi in January 1955 who soon pioneered to Malawi and then Nyasaland. Other local people accepted the Faith soon afterwards, and in April that same year the first Local Spiritual Assembly was formed in Harare (then called Salisbury). The region was gathered together under a regional National Spiritual Assembly of South West Africa in 1956. The first African woman to become a Baha'i in Zimbabwe was Mabel Chiposi, who accepted the religion in 1957. Wide scale growth in the religion across Sub-Saharan Africa was observed to begin in 1950s and extend in the 1960s. By the end of 1963 there were several communities of Baháʼís including nine Baháʼí Local Spiritual Assemblies:

Local Assemblies	Bulawayo	Filabusi	Greendale	Highfields	Mondoro	Mrewa	Salisbury(now Harare)	Salisbury Motel	Waterfalls
Groups	Bangira	Chirundu	Filabusi Village	Gwanda	Gwelo	Hatfield	Norton	Rusapi	Umtali
Isolated Individuals	Beitbridge	Crowborough	Gatooma	Marandellas	Wankie	West Nicholson			

== Growth ==
Hand of the Cause John Robarts lived in Bulawayo with his family from 1957 to 1967. While still a colony of the United Kingdom, the Baháʼís nevertheless organized a separate National Spiritual Assembly in 1964, and Hand of the Cause Enoch Olinga represented the Universal House of Justice at the first national convention. Though Rhodesia declared independence in 1965, succeeding political developments and wars changed the status of the country and the National Assembly was reformed and has continued since 1970. In October 1979 some 60 members of the religion from nine communities in Matabeleland participated in the first regional conference at Bulawayo. In April 1980 more than 50 attended the four-day summer school at the national Center in Salisbury. Zimbabwe regained independence in 1980. In 1983 the national convention had 67 delegates. In 1985 182 local assemblies were elected and some one hundred women attended a National Baháʼí Women's Conference. Baháʼís estimated the Zimbabwean community at 20,000 in 1985, a 20 fold increase from 1971.

Since its inception the religion has had involvement in socio-economic development beginning by giving greater freedom to women, promulgating the promotion of female education as a priority concern, and that involvement was given practical expression by creating schools, agricultural coops, and clinics. The religion entered a new phase of activity when a message of the Universal House of Justice dated 20 October 1983 was released. Baháʼís were urged to seek out ways, compatible with the Baháʼí teachings, in which they could become involved in the social and economic development of the communities in which they lived. Worldwide in 1979 there were 129 officially recognized Baháʼí socio-economic development projects. By 1987, the number of officially recognized development projects had increased to 1482. In 1984 a literacy project was begun and operated entirely by local members of the religion. In 1986 the Baháʼís of Zimbabwe hosted a conference on the education of children with speakers from government ministries and UNICEF addressing the meetings and coverage by radio stations. By 1988 teacher training for tutorial schools, literacy and pre-school programs was held in Zimbabwe. In November 1988 a national women's conference gathered 71 Baháʼís. In 1989 a Baháʼí expert and businessman in using appropriate technology from Swaziland traveled through six southern and eastern African countries including Zimbabwe training local people in the manufacture of several kinds of fence-making machines and other technologies in building, agriculture and water programs. The 10-day training courses were organized by the National Spiritual Assemblies in each of the six countries. Two major arts events took place in Zimbabwe in 1994 among the Baháʼís. The first was a national music and drama congress, held in August in Mhondoro, with approximately 200 attending. The drama group from Murewa and the Epworth children's choir won in their respective categories. The second major event was in December with participants 30 different countries for the Zimbabwe Baháʼí International Summer School and Music and Drama Festival. In the music competition of that event, a group called Voice of the Youth, from Bulawayo, walked away with the first prize, the Murewa Choir came second, and the Epworth Choir came third.

== Modern community ==
After smaller regional congresses held throughout the nation, Baháʼís from all provinces of Zimbabwe and nine countries attended the festivities of the 50th anniversary of the Baháʼí Faith in Zimbabwe that were held from 12 to 14 December 2003. The festivities included performances by groups "Isitsha Sothando" from Ndebele tribe, "Letters of the Living," from Mashonaland Central Province, and others. Some 80 Baháʼís from Zimbabwe, including a 2008 member of the National Spiritual Assembly, attended the first of 41 conferences called for by the Universal House of Justice in October for between November and February 2008–9, held in neighboring Zambia along with Baháʼís from Malawi.

=== Demographics ===
As of 2003 Baháʼís lived in more than 1,600 localities in urban and rural areas of Zimbabwe, and there are 43 local spiritual assemblies. There are Baháʼí centers in Harare, Bulawayo, Chinamora, Mubaira, and Murewa.

== See also ==
- Religion in Zimbabwe
- History of Zimbabwe
