= Baháʼí Faith in Slovakia =

The Baháʼí Faith in Slovakia dates from about 1916 with an appeal by ʻAbdu'l-Bahá that Baháʼís should take the religion to the regions of Europe including Slovakia, then part of the empire of Austria-Hungary. It is unclear when the first Baháʼís entered Slovakia, but there were Baháʼís in what is now Czechoslovakia by 1910. As the communist period was ending, there is evidence of activity in Slovakia starting around 1989. Following the dissolution of the Soviet Union in late 1991, Baháʼí communities and their administrative bodies started to develop across the region formerly under the influence of the Soviet Union, including Czechoslovakia. In 1991 Slovakia's first Baháʼí Local Spiritual Assembly was elected in Bratislava, which is also home to the Forel International School. Separate national assemblies for the Czech Republic and Slovakia were formed in 1998. While registration with the national government of Slovakia is not required it is required for many religious activities as well as owning property. In 2007 representatives of the Baháʼí Faith submitted 28,000 signatures of supportive citizens to the government of Slovakia, gaining official recognition as a registered religious community. The Association of Religion Data Archives (relying on World Christian Encyclopedia) estimated some 680 Baháʼís in 2005.

== Early days ==
=== ʻAbdu'l-Bahá's Tablets of the Divine Plan ===
Before 1918, the region of Slovakia was part of the empire of Austria-Hungary. ʻAbdu'l-Bahá, then head of the religion, wrote a series of letters, or tablets, to the followers of the religion in the United States in 1916–1917 suggesting Baháʼís take the religion to many lands, including these. These letters were compiled in the book titled Tablets of the Divine Plan, but its publication was delayed owing to World War I and the Spanish flu pandemic. They were translated and published in Star of the West magazine on 12 December 1919. One tablet says in part:

"In brief, this world–consuming war has set such a conflagration to the hearts that no word can describe it. In all the countries of the world the longing for universal peace is taking possession of the consciousness of men. There is not a soul who does not yearn for concord and peace. A most wonderful state of receptivity is being realized.… Therefore, O ye believers of God! Show ye an effort and after this war spread ye the synopsis of the divine teachings in the British Isles, France, Germany, Austria–Hungary, Russia, Italy, Spain, Belgium, Switzerland, Norway, Sweden, Denmark, Holland, Portugal, Rumania, Serbia, Montenegro, Bulgaria, Greece, Andorra, Liechtenstein, Luxembourg, Monaco, San Marino, Balearic Isles, Corsica, Sardinia, Sicily, Crete, Malta, Iceland, Faroe Islands, Shetland Islands, Hebrides and Orkney Islands."

=== New beginnings ===
It is not clear when the first Baháʼís entered Slovakia but there were Baháʼís in Czechoslovakia by 1910. However, in the Soviet sphere during the period of the Warsaw Pact the civil government adopted the Soviet policy of oppression of religion, so the Baháʼís, strictly adhering to their principle of obedience to legal government, abandoned its administration and properties. There was a group of Baháʼís in Prague for a period of time.

As the period of communist dominance in Eastern Europe was ending, there is evidence of organized activity in Slovakia dating from around 1989. Significant expansion and consolidation of Baháʼí communities was occurring by the time of the dissolution of the Soviet Union in late 1991, with Baháʼí administrative bodies elected throughout areas that had been cut off behind the Iron Curtain, including Czechoslovakia. 1991 saw the election of the first Baháʼí Local Spiritual Assembly, in Bratislava, and later in the same year of the National Spiritual Assembly of Czechoslovakia and the Local Assembly of Košice. Separate national assemblies for the Czech Republic and Slovakia were formed in 1998.

== Modern community ==
There are established Baháʼí communities in and around Banská Bystrica, Bratislava, Košice, Trenčín, and Trnava.

Since the inception of the Baháʼí Faith, its founder Baháʼu'lláh exhorted believers to involvement in Socioeconomic development, leading individuals to become active in various projects. Although there has been no long–term project organized by the Baháʼí Community of Slovakia, individuals from Slovakia have undertaken projects both here (in the form of non-governmental organizations and non-denominational private schools) and abroad (see for example mention of Earth Day 1995, when Slovakia joined the list of countries with soil deposited in the Peace Monument of the Earth Summit in Rio de Janeiro).

Prominent figures from Slovakia who are not themselves Baháʼís have shown interest in Baháʼí projects and issues internationally, most recently on 13 December 2004 when the First Lady of the Slovak Republic, Silvia Gašparovičová, attended a prayer service at New Delhi's Lotus Temple, the Baháʼí House of Worship.

=== Registration ===
Registration of religious groups is not required under Slovak law, only registered religious groups have the legal right to own property, build places of worship, officiate at marriages, and conduct public worship services and other activities. Those that register are eligible for financial support from the government, including subsidies for clergy and administrative expenses. The Baháʼís of Slovakia were among a short list of recognized communities refusing to accept such financial support, as Baháʼí law prohibits financial contribution from outside the Baháʼí community. In early 2007, representatives of the Baháʼí Faith submitted to the government of Slovakia 28,000 signatures from citizens in support of their registration. This met the contemporary requirement for recognition as a registered religious community, which was soon granted by the Slovak government. At the time, there is mention of there being 200 members of the Slovak Baháʼí community. The Association of Religion Data Archives (relying on World Christian Encyclopedia) estimated some 680 Baháʼís in 2005. Shortly thereafter, the law was changed to require 20000 individuals to actually be members of the religion before it could be registered.

== See also ==
- History of Slovakia
