= Baháʼí Faith in Senegal =

The Baháʼí Faith in Senegal begins after ʻAbdu'l-Bahá, the son of the founder of the religion, mentioned Africa as a place the religion should be more broadly visited by Baháʼís. The first to set foot in the territory of French West Africa that would become Senegal arrived in 1953. The first Baháʼí Local Spiritual Assembly of Senegal was elected in 1966 in Dakar. In 1975 the Baháʼí community elected the first National Spiritual Assembly of Senegal. Baháʼís claimed there are 34 local assemblies in 2003. The most recent estimate, by the Association of Religion Data Archives in a 2005 report estimates the population of Senegalese Baháʼís at 24700.

== Early Phase ==
=== ʻAbdu'l-Bahá's Tablets of the Divine Plan ===
ʻAbdu'l-Bahá, the son of the founder of the religion, wrote a series of letters, or tablets, to the followers of the religion in the United States in 1916–1917; these letters were compiled together in the book Tablets of the Divine Plan. The eighth and twelfth of the tablets mentioned Africa and were written on April 19, 1916, and February 15, 1917, respectively. Publication however was delayed in the United States until 1919—after the end of the First World War and the Spanish flu. The tablets were translated and presented by Mirza Ahmad Sohrab on April 4, 1919, and published in Star of the West magazine on December 12, 1919. ʻAbdu'l-Bahá mentions Baháʼís traveling "…especially from America to Europe, Africa, Asia and Australia, and travel through Japan and China. Likewise, from Germany teachers and believers may travel to the continents of America, Africa, Japan and China; in brief, they may travel through all the continents and islands of the globe" and " …the anthem of the oneness of the world of humanity may confer a new life upon all the children of men, and the tabernacle of universal peace be pitched on the apex of America; thus Europe and Africa may become vivified with the breaths of the Holy Spirit, this world may become another world, the body politic may attain to a new exhilaration…."

=== Establishment and growth ===
During the late colonial period of the region the Baháʼí Faith first arrived. Wide scale growth in the religion across Sub-Saharan Africa was observed to begin in 1950s. The first Baháʼís to enter French West Africa came in 1953 and dispersed to several regions - Labib Isfahani was the first Baháʼí to settle in what became Senegal and named a Knight of Baháʼu'lláh. He come from the community of Baháʼís in Egypt. Isfahani's brother Habib came to join him in April 1954. There were over 1000 Baháʼís across North-West Africa which was organized into a regional National Spiritual Assembly including French West Africa in 1956. In 1959 Baháʼí marriage ceremonies were legalized and the first such marriage had Hand of the Cause Enoch Olinga in attendance.

Growth in the Senegalese community came partly by pioneers and partly from converts. In early 1962 the family of Rouhani Ardekani stayed for six-months in Senegal and in 1966 returned to settle permanently. The first Baháʼí of Senegalese origin converted in March 1962. In 1963 the communities of French West Africa, then included a small group of Baháʼís in Dakar. With the help of Baháʼís originally from Gambia in Dakar the community formed the first Local Spiritual Assembly in Dakar on 21 April 1966. During much of the 1960s-1970s Hermione Vera Keens-Douglas Edwards composed letters for the communities of the former French West Africa for their Nineteen Day Feasts.

Additional one well known Baháʼí made an impact in Senegal and beyond - Robert Hayden, who had become a Baháʼí in 1943, was named Poet Laurette of Senegal in 1966 after winning the 1965 first World Festival of Negro Arts festival Grand Prix de la Poesie with over ten thousand people from thirty-seven nations in attendance on April 7, 1962 and went on to further acclaim.

In 1975 the Baháʼí community elected the first National Spiritual Assembly of Senegal and by the beginning of 1978 there were 30 local assemblies. The first regional Baháʼí conference of the Casamance region happened in 1979 with participants from Gambia and Senégal in December 1978, and at the end of that year there were 35 assemblies.

== Modern community ==
Since its inception the religion has had involvement in socio-economic development (SED) beginning by giving greater freedom to women, promulgating the promotion of female education as a priority concern, and that involvement was given practical expression by creating schools, agricultural coops, and clinics. The religion entered a new phase of activity when a message of the Universal House of Justice dated 20 October 1983 was released. Baháʼís were urged to seek out ways, compatible with the Baháʼí teachings, in which they could become involved in the social and economic development of the communities in which they lived. Worldwide in 1979 there were 129 officially recognized Baháʼí socio-economic development projects. By 1987, the number of officially recognized development projects had increased to 1482. Representatives of the national assemblies of Gambia, Mauritania and Senegal gathered in 1983 at a regional conference in Dakar along with other Baháʼís and heard talks ranging from opposition to the religion to the role of women in the community. Meanwhile, Baháʼís of Senegal assisted the neighboring community in the Cape Verde Islands with promulgating the religion. In 1983-4 some Baháʼís visiting from Switzerland toured several countries of western Africa - in Senegal they were able to meet with government officials, women's civic groups and were interviewed for local television. In 1984 several activities took place - a Spring school was held, the Baháʼí women's committee held a children's conference, and a regional youth conference was held. In 1985 tutorial schools were opened in two villages. In 1989 a Baháʼí professional traveled the country offering dental care as a service. The community celebrated its 50th anniversary in 2003 and the community has ongoing prayer meetings, Study circles, and classes for children open to the public. There are also SED projects looking at marketable skill development. Baháʼís from Senegal were among those at the regional conference at Abidjan called for by the Universal House of Justice in 2008.

=== Demographics ===
In 2003 the Baháʼís reported the Baháʼí community of Senegal is composed mainly of Senegalese scattered in about 300 locations across the country of whom the vast majority are native Senegalese. Baháʼís reside in 382 localities in Senegal, and there are 34 local Spiritual Assemblies. Social and economic development projects include classes for young teenagers. In 2001 Operation World estimated the Baha'i population at almost 19,000, growing at over 8% per year. The Association of Religion Data Archives estimated the 2005 population of Senegalese Baháʼís at 24,700.

== See also ==
- Religion in Senegal
- History of Senegal
