= Baháʼí Faith in Paraguay =

The Baháʼí Faith in Paraguay begins after ʻAbdu'l-Bahá, then head of the religion, mentioned the country in 1916. Paraguayan Maria Casati was the first to join the religion in 1939 when living in Buenos Aires. The first pioneer to settle in Paraguay was Elizabeth Cheney early in 1940 and the first Baháʼí Local Spiritual Assembly of Asunción was elected in 1944. By 1961 Paraguayan Baháʼís had elected the first National Spiritual Assembly and by 1963 there were 3 local assemblies plus other communities. Recent estimates of Baháʼís mention 5500 or 10,600 though the state Census does not mention the Baháʼís.

== ʻAbdu'l-Bahá's Tablets of the Divine Plan ==
ʻAbdu'l-Bahá, the son of the founder of the religion, wrote a series of letters, or tablets, to the followers of the religion in the United States in 1916-1917; these letters were compiled together in the book titled Tablets of the Divine Plan. The sixth of the tablets was the first to mention Latin American regions and was written on April 8, 1916, but was delayed in being presented in the United States until 1919 — after the end of World War I and the Spanish flu. The first actions on the part of Baháʼí community towards Latin America were that of a few individuals who made trips to Mexico and South America near or before this unavailing in 1919, including Mr. and Mrs. Frankland, and Roy C. Wilhelm, and Martha Root. Root's travels, perhaps the first Baháʼí to the region, began in the summer of 1919 - stopping first in Brazil then other countries before setting out to cross the Andes mountains into Chile in winter. The sixth tablet was translated and presented by Mirza Ahmad Sohrab on April 4, 1919, and published in Star of the West magazine on December 12, 1919.

"His Holiness Christ says: Travel ye to the East and to the West of the world and summon the people to the Kingdom of God. … Attach great importance to the indigenous population of America ... the republics of the continent of South America—Colombia, Ecuador, Peru, Brazil, the Guianas, Bolivia, Chile, Argentina, Uruguay, Paraguay, Venezuela; also the islands to the north, east and west of South America, such as Falkland Islands, the Galapagòs, Juan Fernandez, Tobago and Trinidad...."

Following the release of these tablets and then ʻAbdu'l-Bahá's death in 1921, a few Baháʼís began moving to or at least visiting Latin America.

=== Seven Year Plan and succeeding decades ===
Shoghi Effendi, head of the religion after the death of ʻAbdu'l-Bahá, wrote a cable on May 1, 1936 to the Baháʼí Annual Convention of the United States and Canada, and asked for the systematic implementation of ʻAbdu'l-Bahá's vision to begin. In his cable he wrote:

Appeal to assembled delegates ponder historic appeal voiced by ʻAbdu'l-Bahá in Tablets of the Divine Plan. Urge earnest deliberation with incoming National Assembly to insure its complete fulfillment. First century of Baháʼí Era drawing to a close. Humanity entering outer fringes most perilous stage its existence. Opportunities of present hour unimaginably precious. Would to God every State within American Republic and every Republic in American continent might ere termination of this glorious century embrace the light of the Faith of Baháʼu'lláh and establish structural basis of His World Order.

Following the May 1 cable, another cable from Shoghi Effendi came on May 19 calling for permanent pioneers to be established in all the countries of Latin America. The Baháʼí National Spiritual Assembly of the United States and Canada appointed the Inter-America Committee to take charge of the preparations. During the 1937 Baháʼí North American Convention, Shoghi Effendi cabled advising the convention to prolong their deliberations to permit the delegates and the National Assembly to consult on a plan that would enable Baháʼís to go to Latin America as well as to include the completion of the outer structure of the Baháʼí House of Worship in Wilmette, Illinois. In 1937 the First Seven Year Plan (1937–44), which was an international plan designed by Shoghi Effendi, gave the American Baháʼís the goal of establishing the Baháʼí Faith in every country in Latin America. With the spread of American Baháʼís in Latin American, Baháʼí communities and Local Spiritual Assemblies began to form in 1938 across the rest of Latin America.

=== Establishment ===
Paraguayan Maria Casati met some of these Baháʼís in Buenos Aires, Argentina and converted to the religion in 1939. The first pioneer to arrive in Paraguay was Elizabeth Cheney in December 1940. Cheney describes that many of the people she thought to be introduced to were in jail when she arrived. However through word-of-mouth from a few she was able to gather a group of 30 of social prominence and interested in universal peace which mentioned the religion and avoid negative connotations (for example by use of the word universal vs international when describing the kind of peace Baháʼís were interested in.) The group first met by January 1941 and a youth group was meeting by June despite social upset from the period before World War II and President Morínigo. Indeed, Cheney had rented her apartment from Sra. Leonar de Morínigo with whom she had shared Baháʼí principles to know what kind of meetings would take place - who in turn defended the religion from accusations by September from a local catholic priest. Cheney did not seek out publicity because of the social conflict going on and her experience of events in Argentina. She also emphasized sincerity, patience, and a universal quality of showing love for all people to encourage the same among the group and beware of showing any sense of superiority whether from nationalism or a self-consciousness in the role of bringing the religion to people. Come September 15 adults expressed interest in taking part in a further class on the religion. Cheney also began English language classes modeled after Lidia Zamenhof's advice as well use using stories about the religion as the medium for learning the language in addition to the meetings directly for those wanting to learn more about the religion. One member of the group attended an International Conference of Progressive Education by October in the States and through contact with the Cheney was invited to Louhelen Baháʼí School. But come November Cheney was taken ill and left Paraguay. On returning to the States she took up work in Race Amity meetings with Louis G. Gregory and Dorothy Beecher Baker and publishing.

=== Growth ===
Shoghi Effendi called for further strengthening of the community in 1943 The first to come back to Paraguay was Gertrude Eisenberg in spring 1943. The next pioneer to come was Virginia Orbison in September 1943 after helping to found an Baháʼí Local Spiritual Assembly in Chile. When Orbison arrived in addition to Eisenberg there was another Baháʼí of the group who had already acknowledged himself as a Baháʼí in the interim and two more of the original group converted at the first meeting Orbison attended in September. The first Baháʼí Local Spiritual Assembly of Paraguay was elected in Asunción in 1944. An All-American Convention was held in 1944, and actor Don Roque Centurión Miranda, counted as the first Baháʼí of Paraguay, was a delegate, (and Cheney was able to visit the convention.) Cheney returned to Paraguay in 1945 to find a community of 26 Baháʼís and so she moved to Nicaragua in October Eisenberg moved in November. A regional committee overseeing pioneers was appointed in 1946 - one for Chili, Argentina, Uruguay, and Paraguay together. The first South American Baháʼí Congress was celebrated in Buenos Aires in November, 1946 with representatives R. Centurion Miranda and Josephine Pla from Paraguay.

=== Reforming the Paraguayan community ===
Retrospectively, a stated purpose for the regional committee was to facilitate a shift in the balance of roles from North American guidance and Latin cooperation to Latin guidance and North American cooperation. The process was well underway by 1950 and was to be enforced about 1953. By 1950 there was still an assembly in Asunción. However, by November 1950 Sheila Rice-Wray transferred her pioneering effort to Paraguay in 1950 where an emergency election was held for vacancies to assure representation to the first South American Baháʼí Convention. Rice-Way was able to "reactivate" members of the Asunción community. She was also joined by Esteban Canales in November. Both Rice-Way and Canales were delegates to the South American convention to elect the regional assembly. When the regional National Assembly of South America was elected in 1951 the members included Paraguayan Esteban Canales. In 1953 translations of Baháʼí literature were made into Guarani. In August 1954 Ellen Sims arrived as another pioneer in Paraguay. In November 1955 the Baháʼís of Paraguay dedicated their permanent Baháʼí Headquarters with an hour-long program with talks in Guarani, Spanish and English, slides and pictures of Baháʼí building and Shrines around the world, and book displays.

== Continued growth ==
The regional assembly was reorganized in 1957 to be made up of Chile, Argentina, Uruguay, Paraguay & Bolivia. Among its members was Miranda of Paraguay 1958 saw the first Baháʼí summer school. The 1958 convention gathered twenty-four delegates in Asuncion from the five countries, including black, white, and Indian races as delegates as well as European and American pioneers. The elected members of the regional national assembly were Jose Mielnik, Athas Costas, Salvador Torma, Roberto Cazcarra, Roque Centurion Miranda, Else Cazcarra, Fabienne Guillon, Mary Binda, and Ellen Sims. 1958 also saw the purchase of the land to one day host the Baháʼí Temple of Paraguay. 1960 saw the election of the local assembly of Encarnación. 1960 also saw the first visit of a Hand of the Cause, Dr. Hermann Grossmann. In 1961 each country of the regional assembly elected its own National Spiritual Assembly. Paraguay's national convention was witnessed by Hand of the Cause, Dr. Ramatu'llah Muhajir. At the convention Dr. Muhajir and the delegates drew up plans for reaching the Indian populations as well as ways to reinforce the communities that already existed. The members of Paraguay's first National Spiritual Assembly were Asadu'llah Akbari, Keihamosh Azampanah, A. Azampanah, Angelica E. deDoldcán, Rosa de Haterza, Luis Van Strate, Rezsi Sunshine, Anibal Torres, Francisco Haterza. By 1963 there were Local Spiritual Assemblies in Asunción, Concepción, and Encarnación as well as a smaller group in Pedro Juan Caballero and members of the community also included some of the Caygüa (Kadiweu?) people. The first Native American Baháʼí of Paraguay, Rosendo Segundo, joined the religion in 1964. Segundo was a member of a Guarani tribe, the Chaco . In 1965 actual contact with the Chaco tribe began. In 1966 a Paraguayan pioneer reached a goal location - Ushuaia. By 1968 there were 8 local assemblies and in 1969 members of the Chulupi speaking and Lengua tribes had converted to the religion and first all-Indian institute in northern Gran Chaco area, in Paraguay with members of the Guarani, Guasurango, (a Tapieté speaking) and Chulupi attending. In 1970 the first Yanaigua (another Tapieté speaking) tribe member joined the religion and that year was first time an indigenous Baháʼí was elected to the national assembly, (in 1982 there were three indigenous members of the national assembly.) And in 1977 a radio campaign began.

== Modern community ==
As recently as 1980 there have been pioneers to Paraguay. Since its inception the religion has had involvement in socio-economic development beginning by giving greater freedom to women, promulgating the promotion of female education as a priority concern, and that involvement was given practical expression by creating schools, agricultural coops, and clinics. In 1980 the Paraguayan community established 4 training schools (1 was already functioning) in rural areas. The religion entered a new phase of activity when a message of the Universal House of Justice dated 20 October 1983 was released. Baháʼís were urged to seek out ways, compatible with the Baháʼí teachings, in which they could become involved in the social and economic development of the communities in which they lived. Worldwide in 1979 there were 129 officially recognized Baháʼí socio-economic development projects. In 1986 the Baháʼís established an agricultural training program with seeds, tools and training. By 1987, the number of officially recognized development projects had increased to 1482. Some more recent events Baháʼís in Paraguay have undertaken include participating in international surveys from 1983 inquiring about activities organized during the United Nations Decade for Women to achieve equality of rights, privileges, and responsibilities for both sexes, as well as to report on obstacles that these communities had faced - responses from Paraguay noted women participated "without restriction in consultation and decision-making" in the local and national administrative functions of the Baháʼí community where "women both vote and are elected." Then the community hosted the first International Women's Conference of Paraguay in July 1988 with over 100 in attendance. During this period, Baháʼís also had children's classes underway. In 1999 Jose Luis Gadea became a member of the International Environment Forum. A series of large youth gatherings were undertaken in 2000 throughout the Americas, beginning in Paraguay in January with a focus to galvanize the youth to address protracted social conflicts such as race and class prejudice, corruption, violence, poverty, and social injustice afflicting their countries. In 2002 former member of the Universal House of Justice David Hofman visited the Paraguayan Baháʼís and noted a possible role for the Baháʼí Training Institutes. Eighty five Baháʼís from Paraguay including Marcos Galeano of Asuncion and Romina P.C. Torres were among those attending the regional conference called for by the Universal House of Justice in 2008 held in São Paulo.

=== Demographics ===
Though various agencies report the size of the community numbers in the thousands, the state census does not count it. The community was noticed on US. Department of State records. The 2001 Association of Religion Data Archives review showed some 10,600 Baháʼís. Operation World estimated some 5,500 and also suggest a rate of growth second only to Islam, and having numbers about twice those of Islam.

== See also ==
- Religion in Paraguay
- History of Paraguay
- Baháʼí Faith in Argentina
