= Baháʼí Faith in Liberia =

The Baháʼí Faith in Liberia begins with the entrance of the first member of the religion in 1952 and the first Baháʼí Local Spiritual Assembly in 1958 in Monrovia. By the end of 1963 there were five assemblies and Liberian Baháʼís elected their first National Spiritual Assembly in 1975. Hosting various conferences through the '70's the community was somewhat disrupted by the First Liberian Civil War with some refugees going to Côte d'Ivoire in 1990 and the re-establishment of the National Spiritual Assembly in 1998. Third parties invited the modern Baháʼí community into their dialogues in the country while Baháʼís have continued their work supporting a private Baháʼí school, the Baháʼí Academy and a private radio station.

== Early phase ==
In 1916-1917 ʻAbdu'l-Bahá, then head of the religion, wrote a series of letters, or tablets, to the followers of the religion in the United States and Canada asking the followers of the religion to travel to regions of Africa; these letters were compiled together in the book titled Tablets of the Divine Plan. The publication was delayed until 1919 in Star of the West magazine on December 12, 1919, after the end of World War I and the Spanish flu.

Particular plans to bring the religion to Uganda began in 1950 involving the cooperation of American, British, Egyptian, and Persian Baháʼí communities and reached a level of coordination and detail that materials were translated into languages widely used in Africa before pioneers reached Africa. Wide scale growth in the religion across Sub-Saharan Africa was observed to begin in the 1950s and extend in the 1960s. In 1952, American William Fosterpioneered to Liberia as the first presence of the religion in the country and began a Baháʼí school named the Baháʼí Academy. Granadan Hermione Vera Keens-Douglas Edwards and Jamaican Julius Edwards (Knight of Baháʼu'lláh for Ghana in 1953) moved to Liberia and Foster and others helped form the first Baháʼí Local Spiritual Assembly in 1958 in Monrovia. Mrs. Edwards served for many years under the Continental Board of Counsellors for Africa. In 1959 Muhammad Mustafa traveled to Liberia and was commissioned to answer some Muslim concerns about the Baháʼí Faith. This was ultimately published as Mustafa, Muhammad. Laura M. Herzog (ed.). Baha'u'llah: The Great Announcement of the Qurʼan. Rowshan Mustafa (trans.). Dhaka, Bangladesh: Baha'i Publishing Trust. There was a second assembly in Bomi Hills (see Tubmanburg) before 1963.

== Growth ==
In 1956, the western African region with about 1000 Baháʼís was organized into the regional National Spiritual Assembly of the Baháʼís of North-West Africa including Tunisia, Algeria, the various Moroccos and Cameroons, Togolands, the Gold Coast, Liberia, Nigeria, Sierra Leone, Madeira, the Canary Island, Cape Verde Islands, and St. Thomas Island. At this time the Baháʼís in Liberia had an endowment or a national center in Bomi Hills By the end of 1963 there were assemblies in Bomi Hills, Harper City, Pleebo, Gboweta, and Monrovia. There were smaller groups of Baháʼís in the a district of Gbarnga, Mano River Camp and Totota. Individual Baháʼís lived in Belefania, Gbarma, another district of Gbarnga, Harbel, Kakata, Knowoke, Lazamai, Soboreke, Suakoko, and districts of Webbo. In 1967, the Baháʼí marriage ceremony was accepted in Liberia. And Enoch Olinga also had a large influence on growth of the community including witnessing the first election of the National Spiritual Assembly in 1975.

In 1971, the Baháʼís of Liberia hosted one of the Continental Conferences called for by the Universal House of Justice. The Baháʼí Faith was a recognized part of the intellectual milieu at the University of Liberia in the early 1970s. The community hosted a West African Baháʼí Women's Conference held at the University of Liberia in December 1978. However, between the First and Second Liberian Civil War stretching from 1989 to 2003, some 200 Liberian Baháʼí refugees fled to Côte d'Ivoire in 1990 and there re-elected Local Assemblies, established regular Baháʼí meetings, invested the equivalent of $20 in order to buy tools for gardens and fish ponds and by ??? about 1,000 Baháʼís and 25 Local Assemblies in the area. The use of folk art was mentioned as one reason for growth in the community - Liberian Baháʼís had established a Light of Unity Project for promoting the arts. and Baháʼí radio stations of which Liberia has one.

In 1994 the first national youth conference held at which 75 youth came. By 1998, the National Spiritual Assembly was re-elected.

== Modern community ==
Since its inception the religion has had involvement in socio-economic development beginning by giving greater freedom to women, promulgating the promotion of female education as a priority concern, and that involvement was given practical expression by creating schools, agricultural coops, and clinics. The religion entered a new phase of activity when a message of the Universal House of Justice dated 20 October 1983 was released. Baháʼís were urged to seek out ways, compatible with the Baháʼí teachings, in which they could become involved in the social and economic development of the communities in which they lived. Worldwide in 1979 there were 129 officially recognized Baháʼí socio-economic development projects. By 1987, the number of officially recognized development projects had increased to 1482. While Liberia was still in civil war Baháʼís continued to be active in and near Liberia. In 2000 a Baháʼí was among the volunteers that gave relief to refugees in Ghana. In 2002, Kathleen and Brannon Underwood pioneered in Liberia for a short time. Brannon had just retired in 2002 from a 30-year career as a professor of rehabilitation counseling in the master's program at South Carolina State University. In 2005 the United States Embassy in Liberia supported a panel discussion among religious leaders from the Islamic, Christian, and Baháʼí faiths. In 2007, the Liberian Better Future Foundation (BFF), in collaboration with the United Nations Refugee Agency, invited Baháʼí youth to be among the participants in a two-day interfaith leadership workshop in Jacob Town and Chairman of the National Spiritual Assembly in 2007, James Peabody spoke to the assemblage.

=== Baháʼí Academy ===
In 2004, Kathleen Underwood returned to serve as principal of the K-12 Baháʼí Academy, which was on the verge of closing. It was broke, needed to repair the roof and didn't have the means necessary to secure a license from the ministry of education have no textbooks relying solely on their instructors for information. Near the end of their studies, students must pass the West African Senior School Certificate Examination (WASSCE) which is administered by the West African Examinations Council. Each day the students participate in Formation, which includes the raising of the Liberian Flag, morning prayer and the recitation of the pledge to their flag.

=== Demographics ===
A small percentage of the Liberian population is Baháʼí, Hindu, Sikh, Buddhist, or atheist. The Association of Religion Data Archives (relying on World Christian Encyclopedia) estimated some 11,691 Baháʼís in 2005.

== See also ==
- History of Liberia
- Religion in Liberia
