= Baháʼí Faith in Bangladesh =

Bangladeshi Bahá'í বাংলাদেশী বাহাই
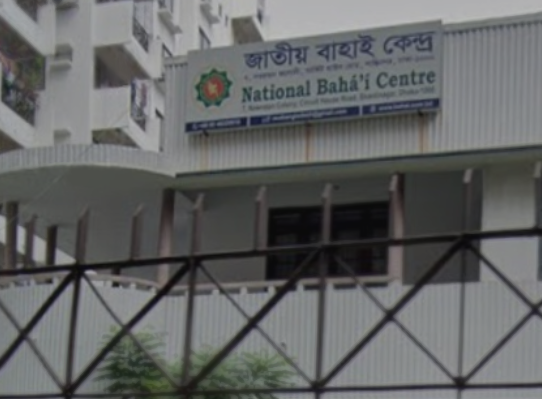
- National Bahá'í Centre, Dhaka, Bangladesh

Total population
- 10,000

Languages
- Bengali and its dialects

The origins of the Baháʼí Faith in Bangladesh begin previous to its independence, when it was part of British Raj. The roots of the Baháʼí Faith in the region go back to the first days of the Bábí religion in 1844.

During Baháʼu'lláh's lifetime, as founder of the religion, he encouraged some of his followers to move to India. It may have been Jamál Effendi who was first sent and stopped in Dhaka more than once. The first Baháʼís in the area that would later become Bangladesh was when a Bengali group from Chittagong accepted the religion while in Burma. By 1950 there were enough members of the religion to elect Local Spiritual Assemblies in Chittagong and Dacca. The total number of Baháʼís in Bangladesh is too small to have any major direct impact on society at large. However, the World Christian Encyclopedia estimated the Baháʼí population of Bangladesh about 9,603 in 2010. According to The Business Standard the population is about 300,000.

== Early period ==
The Baháʼí Faith in Bangladesh begins previous to its independence when it was part of British India. The roots of the Baháʼí Faith in the region go back to the first days of the Bábí religion in 1844. Four Babis are known from India in this earliest period; it is not known from what sub-region they came from, but at least some of them were known as Sufis and some were termed Sayyid. The first was Shaykh Sa'id Hindi, one of the Letters of the Living, who was from somewhere in what was then India. Four other Indians were listed among the 318 Bábís who fought at the Battle of Fort Tabarsi.

=== Early Baháʼí period ===
During Baháʼu'lláh's lifetime, as founder of the religion, he encouraged some of his followers to move to India. In 1878, a Baháʼí moved through Chittagong and Dhaka, passing through on his way to Burma from Calcutta. This may have been Jamál Effendi, an early Baháʼí who travelled there. Regardless it is clear that Effendi undertook a second trip to south-east Asia in about 1884–5. Effendi was asked to return to the region by Baháʼu'lláh and this time accompanied by Sayyid Mustafá. They set off for India and eventually stopped in Dhaka, the capital of Bangladesh where they met some people including a professor of Arabic at Dhaka College. Much later, around 1891, Jamál Effendi was confused with a terrorist and reported on by British agents among the Indian population, as confirmed by records found in the Indian government's national archives. Following the passing of Baháʼu'lláh, as the leadership of the religion fell to ʻAbdu'l-Bahá, he in turn sent further representatives in his stead – both Persian and American.

As early as 1910 the national community in India/Burma was urged to visibly distinguish itself from Islam by Baháʼí institutions of America. Nationally coordinated activities began and reached a peak in December 1920, with the first All-India Baháʼí Convention, held in Bombay for three days. Representatives from India's major religious communities were present as well as Baháʼí delegates from throughout the country.

=== Middle period ===
In 1923, still as part of India, a regional National Spiritual Assembly was formed for India and Burma which then included the area now part of Bangladesh as well as Pakistan. However the first Baháʼís in the area that would later become Bangladesh was when a Bengali group from Chittagong accepted the religion while they were in Burma. In 1937, John Esslemont's Baháʼu'lláh and the New Era was translated and published in Bengali (Baha'u'llah o nab zug) in Chittagong under the authority of the National Spiritual Assembly of India and Burma.

In 1941, Enoch Olinga, later a prominent Baháʼí, was stationed in what was then East Pakistan as a member of the British military before he left the military and became a member of the religion. By 1950 there were enough members of the religion to begin setting up administrative bodies. These were Baháʼí Local Spiritual Assemblies and they were elected in Chittagong and Dacca. With independence as part of Pakistan in 1958, East and West Pakistan elected a separate national assembly from India. In 1959 Muhammad Mustafa travelled to Liberia and was commissioned to address some Muslim concerns about the Baháʼí Faith. This was ultimately published as Baha'u'llah: The Great Announcement of the Qurʼan through the Bangladesh Baháʼí Publishing Trust. In 1960 there was a Teaching Conference of East Pakistan, at Dhaka. By 1963 there was an additional local assembly in Mymensingh and smaller groups between 1 and 9 adults in Jamalpur and Mirpur. Following the independence of Bangladesh in 1971, the national assembly of Bangladesh was also separately elected in 1971. 10 years later the national convention had 61 delegates. In 1974 Rúhíyyih Khanum visited the country, even to meeting with President Mohammad Ullah. In 1984 The Baha'i Fund: A Time for Sacrifice was published by the National Spiritual Assembly of the Baháʼís of Bangladesh.

== In more recent times ==
In 1996 the Universal House of Justice commented:

The Baháʼí community of Bangladesh, flourishing in the midst of a Muslim society, is a source of joy to the entire Baháʼí world. In recent years and with astonishing rapidity, that community began to achieve extraordinary success in the teaching field, and throughout the Three Year Plan it has sustained consistently large-scale expansion. Its institutions have demonstrated their capacity to mobilize the human resources at their disposal, and those who have responded to the call for action have sacrificially and with the utmost devotion spread the Divine Teachings among the Muslim, Hindu and tribal populations of that country. The purity of their motives and the sincerity of their efforts to address the needs of society have won them recognition from government officials in the highest circles. Their exertions to promote love and unity among the majority Muslim and minority Hindu populations are bearing increasing fruit, a striking testimony to the potency of Baháʼu'lláh's Revelation.

== Modern community ==
In Bangladesh the Baháʼís have had the right to hold their public meetings, establish academic centres, teach their faith, and elect their administrative councils. However the government of Bangladesh voted against the United Nations resolution Situation of Human Rights in the Islamic Republic of Iran on 19 December 2001 raised in response to the Persecution of Baháʼís in Iran. Regardless, Baháʼís in Bangladesh have been able to co-ordinate and act in groups. About 150 gathered for a summer school in 1977 and about 300 attended the winter school held February 1978. Zena Sorabjee of the Baháʼí International Community, shared a platform with Pope John Paul II during his visit to India in 1999 and the meeting was aired through satellite television. It is reported that Baháʼís in a number of countries, including Bangladesh, viewed the broadcast. In 2008 about 30 out of 200 Baháʼís managed to get passports and visas and travel from Bangladesh to a regional conference called for by the Universal House of Justice in Kolkata, India, although many more of their fellow believers were not able to make the trip. The Baháʼís went in groups to request their travel documents, with many of them waiting up to three days even to reach the door. In the end, most were turned away without the visa.

Since its inception the religion has had involvement in socio-economic development beginning by giving greater freedom to women, promulgating the promotion of female education as a priority concern, and that involvement was given practical expression by creating schools, agricultural coops, and clinics. The religion entered a new phase of activity when a message of the Universal House of Justice dated 20 October 1983 was released. Baháʼís were urged to seek out ways, compatible with the Baháʼí teachings, in which they could become involved in the social and economic development of the communities in which they lived. Worldwide in 1979 there were 129 officially recognised Baháʼí socio-economic development projects. For the International Year of the Child Bangladesh Baháʼís established tutorial schools in three villages. By 1987, the number of officially recognised development projects had increased to 1482. The Baháʼís in Bangladesh work to promote their interests and contributions to Bangladesh. Even early on there were village level schools run by the local assembly in the Jessore area. In 1981 the second Bangladesh National Baha'i Women's Conference took place attracting Baháʼí women from Bangladesh, India, Iran, Malaysia and Italy. In 1995 three national newspapers published articles on a public meeting sponsored by the local spiritual assembly of Khulna to mark the founding of the United Nations. Tents on the grounds of the Baháʼí Center there were filled with 50 Baháʼís and 200 guests who listened to speeches and then enjoyed the performance of songs written by Baháʼí youth on the theme of unity and amity among the nations and races of the earth. Some of the students of the New Era Development Institute, an educational NGO in India run by the Baháʼís, have come from the Bangladesh Baháʼí community in 1997. In 1988 Baháʼí doctors setup free treatment camps. In addition to work in groups, some individuals have become well known for their contributions to Bangladesh society. Baháʼí Samarendra Nath Goswami, is well known in Bangladesh as Secretary General of the Bangladesh Minority Lawyers Association and senior advocate of Bangladesh Supreme Court and contributed to founding a law journal and two law schools. In 1994, he edited The Principles of Baháʼí Personal Law which was published by the Bangladesh Law Times. In the early 1990s, Baha'i law was included in the law curriculum of Dhaka University. Payam Akhavan, Baháʼí and a renowned human rights lawyer represented Sheikh Hasina (a once and again Prime Minister of Bangladesh).

The Baháʼís of Bangladesh have participated in various efforts affecting society in Bangladesh. Representatives of the Baháʼís of Bangladesh were among those present for a 19 December 2003 conference entitled "Education: The Right of Every Girl and Boy," which was organised by the Baháʼí International Community with the support of the United Nations Children's Fund (UNICEF) and the government of Bangladesh among other institutions. Representatives of the Baháʼí International Community were among the speakers at the "Conference on Interfaith Cooperation for Peace," which was held on 22 June 2005 with the government of Bangladesh among the co-sponsors. December 2007, the Centre for Advance Research in Humanities of Dhaka University organised a seminar on "The Baha'i Faith and World Peace" at the lecture theatre of the university presided over by Prof Kazi Nazrul Islam,(not the famous Bengali individual of the same name who died in 1977) Director of the centre. Mozhgan Bahar, Professor of English Department of American International University-Bangladesh, presented the keynote paper at the seminar.

=== Demographics ===
It is not known how many organised communities of Baháʼís there are in Bangladesh. In 2005 the World Christian Encyclopedia estimated the Baháʼí population of Bangladesh at about 10600. There are reports of many conversions from November 1988 to September 1989 including many Munda and Arakanese people.

== See also ==
- History of Bangladesh
- Religion in Bangladesh
- Baháʼí Faith in India
- Baháʼí Faith in Pakistan
