= Baháʼí Faith in Algeria =

The Baháʼí Faith in Algeria began about 1952. In 1954 the first Baháʼí Local Spiritual Assembly of Algiers was elected. In 1963 a survey of the community counted 2 assemblies, 2 organized groups (between 1 and 9 adults) of Baháʼís and hosted a regional National Spiritual Assembly for Algeria and Tunisia in 1967 however pioneers were expelled in late 1968 during the period of the independence of Algeria when the country adopted Islamic practices in rejection of colonial influences. However more recently the Association of Religion Data Archives and Wolfram Alpha estimated 3.3–3.8 thousand Baháʼís in 2005 and 2010.

== Early history ==
The second Letter of the Living, Muḥammad-Ḥasan Bushrú'í, a prominent follower of the predecessor Bábí Faith, was arrested in 1845 by Ottoman authorities and the punishment they entertained speculated of banishing him to Algeria at one point. Another very early mention is of a Baháʼí wanting to go to Algeria occurs circa 1909. A Kurdish Baháʼí is said to have gone to Algeria about March 1923.

The first known Baháʼís to live there any length of time came in June 1952 when a Persian family travelled from Iran to France, and then on to Algeria, where they pioneered. In about August 1953 Hand of the Cause, (a select group of Baháʼís appointed for life serve the religion at an international level), Dhikru'llah Khadem visited the Baháʼís there and there was some newspaper coverage. By the end of 1953 the first native Algerian convert to the religion was ʻAbdu'l-Karim Amín Khawja. The Algiers Baháʼí Local Spiritual Assembly was established by in 1954. At Ridván 1956 three new Regional Spiritual Assemblies were established including North-West Africa which included Algeria. Circa 1957 a number of Berber peoples joined the religion. By the end of 1963 there was a second assembly in Oran; and two isolated centers. Hand of the Cause Shuʼáʼu'lláh ʻAláʼí was present for the election of the national assembly in 1967. Some 16 Persian pioneers were expelled and five native Baháʼís were banished to the Saharan desert and eastern mountains in November 1968. After some months the confiscated properties were returned and the order of banishment of the local Baháʼís were gradually relaxed. Some of the Algerian pioneers who were expelled then moved to Hong Kong.

== Modern community ==
Since 1968 there is little information on the religion. In 1969 the religion was considered banned. The religion may be considered heretical because the country adopted Islamic practices in rejection of colonial influences. Muslim converts to other religions practice their new faith clandestinely. There is a law in Algeria which makes "shaking the faith" of Muslims punishable - depending on how that is interpreted it might be applied to Baháʼís though they recognized and affirm Muhammad as a prophet. Algerian Baháʼís may have to obtain acceptable national ID cards in a way that lead to the Egyptian identification card controversy. Regardless, Baháʼís have a prominent religious principle requiring obedience to legal governments.

The Promise of World Peace, a major publication of the Universal House of Justice, head institution of the religion, was delivered to the national government indirectly through their diplomatic offices in the United States in 1986.

=== Demographics ===
The World Christian Encyclopedia listed 700 Baháʼís in the mid 1970s, and noted expansion had been checked by waves of persecution and that all activities were banned. However the Association of Religion Data Archives and Wolfram Alpha estimated 3300–3800 in 2005/2010.

== See also ==
- Religion in Algeria
- History of Algeria
- Persecution of Baháʼís
