= Baháʼí Faith in Armenia =

The earliest contact documented to date, between Armenians and the Bábí-Baháʼí religion began on an unfortunate note in the banishments and execution of the Báb, the Founder of the Bábí Faith, viewed by Baháʼís as a precursor religion, but ended courageously to the credit of the Armenian officer. In that same year the teachings of the new religion were taken to Armenia. More research is necessary to determine the details. Decades later, during the time of Soviet repression of religion, Baháʼís in Armenia were isolated from Baháʼís elsewhere. Eventually, by 1963, Baháʼí communities had been identified in Yerevan and Artez and communication re-established. Later, in the time of Perestroika, when increasing freedoms were allowed, there were enough Baháʼís in some cities that Baháʼí Local Spiritual Assemblies could be formed in those Baháʼí communities in 1991. Armenian Baháʼís were able to elect their own National Spiritual Assembly in 1995.

== Early period ==
Contact between Armenia and the Baháʼí Faith begins with the history of the interactions between Haji Mirza Aqasi and Mírzá ʻAbbás Núrí, followed by three successive banishments of the Báb by order of Aqasi and a trial as an apostate. For acts such as these Aqasi was termed "the Antichrist of the Bábí Revelation" by Shoghi Effendi When younger, Aqasi fell from favor for a few years from 1821 as a result of repercussions from rivalry between Baháʼu'lláh's elder brothers in the Court of the Shah but later when Aqasi was Prime Minister he instigated several actions against Baháʼu'lláh's father. After Aqasi fell from power the movement against the Báb he had fostered resulted in the plans to execute him. It was Armenian soldiers who took part in the first attempt of the Execution of the Báb. According to the report of the execution, written to Lord Palmerston, the British Secretary of State for Foreign Affairs, by Sir Justin Shiel, Queen Victoria's Envoy Extraordinary and Minister Plenipotentiary in Tehran on July 22, 1850, records: "When the smoke and dust cleared away after the volley, Báb was not to be seen, and the populace proclaimed that he had ascended to the skies. The balls had broken the ropes by which he was bound…" Shortly, the Báb and his young companion were found and brought out for execution. The Armenian troops refused to fire, and a Muslim firing squad was assembled and ordered to shoot. From 1850 onwards small groups of Bábís spread across the Caucasus including Armenia.

By the time the effects of the October Revolution began to spread across the Russian Empire transforming it into the Soviet Union, Baháʼís had spread through much of Soviet territory. However, with the Soviet policy of religious oppression, the Baháʼís, strictly adhering to their principle of obedience to legal government, abandoned its administration and any properties were nationalized. By 1938 most communities across the Soviet Union had lost contact with the Baháʼís elsewhere. In 1953 Baháʼís started to move to the Soviet Republics in Asia, after the head of the religion at the time, Shoghi Effendi, initiated a plan called the Ten Year Crusade. At the culmination of this plan, in 1963, various centers were restored in the region including Armenia, and at the time there was a Baháʼí community not only in Yerevan but also in Artez.

== Modern community ==
Since its inception the religion has had involvement in socio-economic development beginning by giving greater freedom to women, promulgating the promotion of female education as a priority concern, and that involvement was given practical expression by creating schools, agricultural coops, and clinics. The religion entered a new phase of activity when a message of the Universal House of Justice dated 20 October 1983 was released. Baháʼís were urged to seek out ways, compatible with the Baháʼí teachings, in which they could become involved in the social and economic development of the communities in which they lived. World-wide in 1979 there were 129 officially recognized Baháʼí socio-economic development projects. By 1987, the number of officially recognized development projects had increased to 1482. When Perestroika allowed an atmosphere in which the Baháʼís began to meet and organize again, the first Local Spiritual Assemblies of Armenia formed in 1991. After being part of the regional national assembly with Russia since 1992, Armenian Baháʼís elected their first National Spiritual Assembly in 1995 with Hand of the Cause, Rúhíyyih Khanum representing the Universal House of Justice. Despite a history of contributing to societies in which the Baháʼís are located, there are laws proposed in the Armenian legislature in 2009 proposing to circumscribe religious activities: one proposes that those who organise campaigns to spread their faith would face up to two years' imprisonment, while those who simply engage in spreading their faith would face up to one year's imprisonment or a fine of more than eight years' minimum wages while the other proposes that gaining legal status would require 1,000 adult members and other restrictions. The Armenian daily newspaper, Golos Armenii, wrote in 1995, 'It seems that in our society there is a group of absolutely defenceless people, who can be constantly beaten and terrorised.' Later in the report it stated, 'In other words, we are dealing with a case of pre-planned and widespread assault on (various religions including the Baháʼís).'

There are Baháʼís among the Armenian Diaspora as well as Baháʼí visitors to Armenia. Some 15 Armenian Baháʼís traveled to Kyiv to be among the 730 participants in a regional conference of the religion in 2009.

=== Demographics ===
The US Department of state stated in 2005 that there was no reliable system in place for compiling accurate census data on religious minorities, but that the Baháʼís claim more than 200 members, mostly living in Yerevan.

== See also ==
- Religion in Armenia
- History of Armenia
