= Baháʼí Faith in Mongolia =

The Baháʼí Faith in Mongolia began in the late 1980s, following the loosening of Communist-era restrictions on religion. The first Baháʼí arrived in 1988, and a Local Spiritual Assembly was established soon after. A National Spiritual Assembly was elected in 1994. Though the Association of Religion Data Archives estimated only 50 Baháʼís in 2005, more than 1,700 attended a regional conference in 2009.

== History ==
The first Baháʼí to reside in Mongolia was Sean Hinton, who arrived in December 1988. The first Mongolian convert, Ms. Oyundelger, joined in 1989. Subsequent outreach efforts in the early 1990s led to the formation of new communities beyond Ulaanbaatar, and the first Baháʼí Summer School was held in 1993. In 1995, Mongolia hosted its first national youth school.

Programs such as the Ruhi Institute have contributed to the growth of the community. In 1996, Baháʼí sources recorded 228 new adherents, with further expansion in 2004 adding 200 more, including 60 youth participants.

In 2009, a regional conference held in Ulaanbaatar gathered over 1,800 participants from Mongolia and Russia. Speakers included officials from the Mongolian government and members of the Baháʼí Institution of the Counsellors.

British Baháʼí David Lambert (OBE) and his wife Lois were recognized for their contributions to education and health in Mongolia. David Lambert chaired the National Spiritual Assembly in 2003 and helped establish Mongolia’s largest English-language library. Lois Lambert was awarded a national honor for her work in medical training.

Since 2001, Mongolian Baháʼí efforts have also drawn on initiatives such as FUNDAEC and translated key texts, including the Hidden Words, into Mongolian.

== Community development ==
Since its inception, the Baháʼí Faith has been involved in socio-economic development, particularly through the promotion of gender equality and female education. This has included the establishment of schools, agricultural cooperatives, and clinics. A 1983 message from the Universal House of Justice encouraged Baháʼís to expand these efforts. By 1987, there were 1,482 recognized Baháʼí development projects worldwide, up from 129 in 1979.

=== Mongolian Development Centre ===
Established in 1993 in Ulaanbaatar, the Mongolian Development Centre (MDC) is a Baháʼí-inspired NGO focused on applying spiritual principles to education and community development. Its programs include early childhood character education, junior youth empowerment, and community development initiatives such as vegetable gardening and microfinance. By 2007, its junior youth program was active in 11 schools, reaching over 1,300 participants. The organization also operated six community banks with about 100 members as of that year.

=== Erdenbulgan Gardening Project ===
In response to widespread nutritional deficiencies, the Baháʼí community in Erdenbulgan launched a vegetable gardening initiative in 1997 with support from national and international Baháʼí resources.

=== Moral education classes ===
Since 2007, Baháʼís have provided moral education classes at the Etugen Institute, a medical college in Ulaanbaatar, through the Ruhi Institute curriculum. As of 2009, 400 students were enrolled in the program, facilitated by a team of 14 Baháʼí volunteers, at the invitation of the college's director, Dr. Byambaagiin Batsereedene.

== See also ==
- History of modern Mongolia
- Religion in Mongolia
