= Baháʼí Faith in Bahrain =

The Baháʼí Faith in Bahrain begins with a precursor movement, the Shaykhís coming out of Bahrain into Iran. Abu'l-Qásim Faizi and wife lived in Bahrain in the 1940s. Around 1963 the first Local Spiritual Assembly of Bahrain was elected in the capital of Manama. In the 1980s, many anti-Baháʼí polemics were published in local newspapers of the Bahrain. Recent estimates count some 1,000 Baháʼís or 0.2% of the national population or a little more by Association of Religion Data Archives estimated there were some 2,832 Baháʼís in 2010. According to the Bahraini government the combined percentage of Christians, Jews, Hindus and Baháʼís is 0.2%.

== Early phase ==
The founder of the Shaykhí movement, Shaykh Ahmad, was born in 1753, in the region known as Al-Bahrain or Al-Ahsa, which is on the Arabian Peninsula near to modern Bahrain. Details of this are provided in an early Baháʼí publication, The Dawn-Breakers. Abu'l-Qásim Faizi and wife lived in Bahrain in the 1940s; they found one convert in the seven years of their stay. A documented community existed by 1949 The community acquired a center in Manama in 1954. It was a two-story building and rented home to care taking Baháʼís and families. In keeping with Baháʼí teachings the Baháʼís of Bahrain bury their dead and were first granted a cemetery at the time of Sheikh Salman Al-Khalifa, in the year 1955. Around 1963 the Baháʼís of Bahrain had organized a Baháʼí Local Spiritual Assembly in the capital of Manama, a national center, and was a member of a regional National Spiritual Assembly across Arabia. In 1968 another center was purchased which served until 1993 when another center was acquired.

== Oppressed community ==
Traditionally the Ministry of Islamic Affairs had repeatedly denied the Baháʼí community's request for a license to operate. The Ministry of Islamic Affairs stated that the religion is an offshoot of Islam. According to its official interpretation of Islam, the government regards the core beliefs of Baha'is to be blasphemous and consequently illegal, and therefore the Ministry refuses to recognize the religion, but it allows the community to gather and worship freely. In the 1980s, many anti-Baháʼí polemics were published in local newspapers of the Bahrain.

== Current status ==
Recent estimates count some 1,000 Baháʼís, or 0.2% of the national population or a little more by Association of Religion Data Archives estimated there were some 1800 Baháʼís in 2005. Baháʼís reported they have not sought official recognition from the government; however, the group maintained a functioning cemetery on land donated by the government, as well as the center they established in 1963, and land for a future Baháʼí temple - indeed the government authorized the publication and public discussion of a book by a Bahraini citizen on the Baha'i community. Newspapers in Bahrain and elsewhere in the region reported on the Egyptian identification card controversy, with many going into long explanations about the Baháʼí Faith around 2006. Circa 2009 there were about twenty-two graves in a walled off Baháʼí cemetery, set off by a water fountain according to a pattern established by ʻAbdu'l-Bahá, who recommended setting a water fountain in the middle of cemeteries. A film called "School" was shown at the Dawn Breakers International Film Festival in 2009.

=== Baháʼí Social Society ===
Baháʼí Social Society is a Baháʼí NGO that claims to have been working for the betterment of Bahraini people. It organises various Baháʼí inspired programs for Bahraini people. In the year 2019 this NGO organised an event to celebrate 200th birthday of Baha'u'llah, the founder of the Baháʼí faith, with members of Bahraini civil society and government officials.

== See also ==
- History of Bahrain
- Freedom of religion in Bahrain
