= Baháʼí Faith in Zambia =

The history of the Baháʼí Faith in Zambia began in 1952 with the arrival of a British pioneer named Eric Manton. The first local convert was Christopher Mwitumwa in 1954. The Baháʼí Faith has expanded considerably in Zambia since then; some estimates have put the Baháʼí population in Zambia as high as 241,112, though the Zambian Baháʼí community itself and UNdata have estimated around 4,000 adherents. The Baháʼí community of Zambia oversees several social initiatives, for instance in education with an emphasis on girls' education.

== Statistics ==
The number of Baháʼís in Zambia was estimated at 162,443 in 2000, or 1.70% of the total population, according to Adherents.com. The site ranks this as the sixteenth-highest national proportion of Baháʼís in the world. It also ranks Zambia's as the tenth-largest national Baháʼí community in the world in absolute terms, and the fourth-largest in Africa. The Association of Religion Data Archives gives a Baháʼí population of 241,112 in 2010, or 1.7% of Zambia's population. Based on its estimates (which differ to some extent from Adherents.com's), this represents the fifth-highest proportion of Baháʼís of any country. Both these sources rely on World Christian Encyclopedia, with data from the respective years.

According to the Wolfram Alpha knowledge base, 1.8% of people in Zambia are Baháʼí, making the Baháʼí Faith the third-largest religion after Christianity (83%) and indigenous religions (13% in total).

According to the official website of the Baháʼís of Zambia, there were over 4,000 Baháʼís in 2018. The UNData website reported 3,891 Baháʼís in 2018.

== History ==
In 1952 Eric Manton became the first Baháʼí pioneer to Zambia (then Northern Rhodesia, part of the British-administered Federation of Rhodesia and Nyasaland) as well as the first to southern Africa when he arrived from Britain in along with his twelve-year-old son. He was joined by Ethna Archibald of New Zealand in 1955. The first native Zambian convert was Christopher Mwitumwa, an ethnic Lozi, in 1954. The first Local Spiritual Assembly was formed in Fisenge in 1956, followed by Assemblies in Kitwe and Luanshya. The Baháʼí Faith in Zambia was at first confined to the Copperbelt Province, but in 1962 it spread to the North-Western Province when seven people declared themselves Baháʼís at a devotional meeting in Mwinilunga.

The first National Spiritual Assembly was elected in 1967. The following year it was officially incorporated and the premises for a national Baháʼí centre were obtained. Beginning in 1975, annual national conferences have been held in Zambia on teaching the Baháʼí Faith, and in 1983 the Continental Board of Counsellors for Africa met in Zambia for the first time. In 1998, the first Regional Baháʼí Council in Zambia was formed to serve North-Western Province.

== Social initiatives ==
The William Mmutle Masetlha Foundation (WMMF), an organization founded in 1995 and run by the Zambian Baháʼí community, specializes in providing vocational training and education. It is responsible for the affairs of both the William Mmutle Masetlha Institute and the Banani International Secondary School. The Masetlha Institute was founded in 1983, and is particularly active in areas such as literacy and primary health care. The Banani International Secondary School, which was founded in 1993, is a residential school for girls focused on agriculture and science, and was listed as one of Africa's top one hundred secondary schools in 2003. The Zambian Baháʼí community is working with FUNDAEC, an organization operated by the Colombian Baháʼí community, to create a vocational and educational program for youth in rural areas.

== See also ==
- Baháʼí Faith in Africa
- Baháʼí Faith in South Africa
- Baháʼí Faith in Kenya
- Religion in Zambia
