= Tablets of the Divine Plan =

14 letters by ʻAbdu'l-Bahá, 1916 to 1917

The Tablets of the Divine Plan collectively refers to 14 letters (tablets) written between March 1916 and March 1917 by ʻAbdu'l-Bahá to Baháʼís in the United States and Canada. Included in multiple books, the first five tablets were printed in America in Star of the West - Vol. VII, No. 10, September 8, 1916, and all the tablets again after World War I in Vol. IX, No. 14, November 23, 1918, before being presented again at the Ridván meeting of 1919.

Four of the letters were addressed to the Baháʼí community of North America and ten subsidiary ones were addressed to five specific segments of that community. Of primary significance was the role of leadership given to its recipients in establishing their cause throughout the planet by pioneering — introducing the religion into the many countries and regions and islands mentioned.

These collective letters, along with Baháʼu'lláh's Tablet of Carmel and ʻAbdu'l-Bahá's Will and Testament were described by Shoghi Effendi as three of the "Charters" of the Administrative Order of the Baháʼí Faith.
