= Tablet (religious) =

Term used for certain religious texts

A tablet, in a religious context, is a term used for certain religious texts.

== In the Hebrew Bible ==
Judaism and Christianity maintain that Moses brought the Ten Commandments down from Mount Sinai in the form of two tablets of stone. According to the Book of Exodus, God delivered the tablets twice, the first set having been smashed by Moses in his anger at the idol worship of the Israelites. As such, the Hebrew Bible contains the tablets of the law or testimony.

One of the oldest known tablets is a late Roman-Byzantine era (circa 500 AD) tablet of the Ten Commandments which was written in the Paleo-Hebrew script and unearthed in 1913 during excavations.

== In Islam ==
The Preserved Tablet (al-Lawhu 'l-Mahfuz), the heavenly preserved record of all that has happened and will happen, contains qadar. Qadar (Arabic: قدر, transliterated qadar, meaning "fate", "divine fore-ordainment", "predestination") is the concept of divine destiny in Islam.

== In the Baháʼí Faith ==
The term "tablet" is part of the title of many shorter works of Baháʼu'lláh, founder of the Baháʼí Faith, and his son and successor ʻAbdu'l-Bahá.

== See also ==
- Book of Life
- Emerald Tablet
- Tablet of Destinies, a divine tablet of supreme importance in Mesopotamian mythology
- Stele
- World's largest book, a stone book the pages of which are inscribed stone tablets
