= Baháʼí Faith in Africa =

The history of the Baháʼí Faith in Africa dates back to the lifetimes of the three individual heads of the religion, Baháʼu'lláh, ʻAbdu'l-Bahá, and Shoghi Effendi, each of who was in Africa at least once. The Association of Religion Data Archives (relying on World Christian Encyclopedia) lists many larger and smaller populations in Africa with Kenya, the Democratic Republic of the Congo, South Africa and Zambia among the top ten numerical populations of Baháʼís in the world in 2005, and Mauritius highest in terms of percentage of the national population. There are Baháʼí Houses of Worship in Uganda, Kenya, and in the Democratic Republic of the Congo. A plan for a House of Worship in Zambia was announced in 2023.

== History ==
=== Baháʼu'lláh's lifetime ===
Among its earliest contacts with the religion came in Egypt. The Baháʼí Faith in Egypt begins perhaps with the first Baháʼís arriving in 1863. Baháʼu'lláh, founder of the religion, was himself briefly in Egypt in 1868 when on his way to imprisonment in ʻAkká. Nabíl-i-Aʻzam made several journeys on behalf of Baháʼu'lláh and was imprisoned in Egypt in 1868. Robert Felkin was in Egypt circa 1880s and published a number of books -later he converted to the religion. In 1892 two converts in Egypt embarked to the West intending to spread the religion and were the first Baháʼís to enter the United States where the first converts followed in 1894. The first Egyptian converts had taken place by 1896.

=== ʻAbdu'l-Bahá's leadership ===
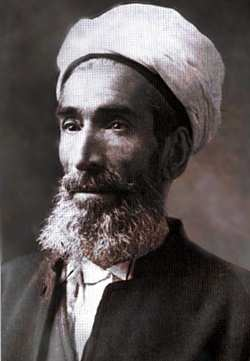
Mírzá Abu'l-Faḍl-i-Gulpáygání

Mírzá Abu'l-Faḍl-i-Gulpáygání, often called Mírzá Abu'l-Faḍl, was the first prominent Baháʼí to live in Africa and made some of the first big changes to the community in Egypt. Abdu'l-Fadl first came to Cairo in 1894 where he settled for several years. He was the foremost Baháʼí scholar and helped spread the Baháʼí Faith in Egypt, Turkmenistan, and the United States. In Egypt, he was successful in converting some thirty of the students of Al-Azhar University, the foremost institution of learning in the Sunni Muslim world. Abu'l-Faḍl also became friends with writers and magazine publishers, and many articles that he authored appeared in the Egyptian press. In 1896, when Nasiru'd-Din Shah was assassinated in Iran, an enemy of the Baháʼís, Zaʻimu'd-Dawlih, used the rumour that the assassination had been performed by Baháʼís, to cause a massacre of the Baháʼís in Egypt. When Abu'l-Faḍl stood up in defense for the Baháʼís and stated that he himself was a Baháʼí, his allegiance became public; then when his two books Fara'id and Al-Duraru'l-Bahiyyih were published in 1897-1900 the al-Azhar University decreed that Abu'l-Faḍl was an infidel.

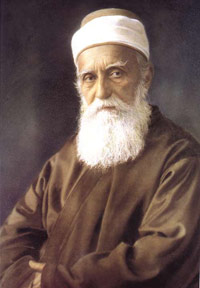
Abdu'l-Bahá

ʻAbdu'l-Bahá, head of the religion after Baháʼu'lláh, lived in Egypt for several years and several people came to meet him there: Stanwood Cobb, Wellesley Tudor Pole, Isabella Grinevskaya, and Louis George Gregory, later the first Hand of the Cause of African descent, visited ʻAbdu'l-Bahá at Ramleh in 1911. ʻAbdu'l-Bahá then embarked on several trips to the West taking an ocean liner for the first one on August 11, 1911. He left on the next trip left March 25, 1912. One of the earliest Baháʼís of the west and a Disciple of ʻAbdu'l-Bahá, Lua M. Getsinger, died in 1916 and she was buried in Egypt near Mírzá Abu'l-Faḍl.

ʻAbdu'l-Bahá wrote a series of letters, or tablets, to the followers of the religion in the United States in 1916–1917; these letters were compiled together in the book Tablets of the Divine Plan. The eighth and twelfth of the tablets mentioned Africa and were written on 19 April 1916 and 15 February 1917, respectively. Publication however was delayed in the United States until 1919—after the end of the First World War and the Spanish flu. The tablets were translated and presented by Mirza Ahmad Sohrab on 4 April 1919, and published in Star of the West magazine on 12 December 1919. ʻAbdu'l-Bahá mentions Baháʼís traveling "…especially from America to Europe, Africa, Asia and Australia, and travel through Japan and China. Likewise, from Germany teachers and believers may travel to the continents of America, Africa, Japan and China; in brief, they may travel through all the continents and islands of the globe" and " …the anthem of the oneness of the world of humanity may confer a new life upon all the children of men, and the tabernacle of universal peace be pitched on the apex of America; thus Europe and Africa may become vivified with the breaths of the Holy Spirit, this world may become another world, the body politic may attain to a new exhilaration…."

=== Shoghi Effendi's leadership ===
Shoghi Effendi, who was appointed the leader of the religion after ʻAbdu'l-Bahá's death, travelled through Africa in 1929 and again in 1940.

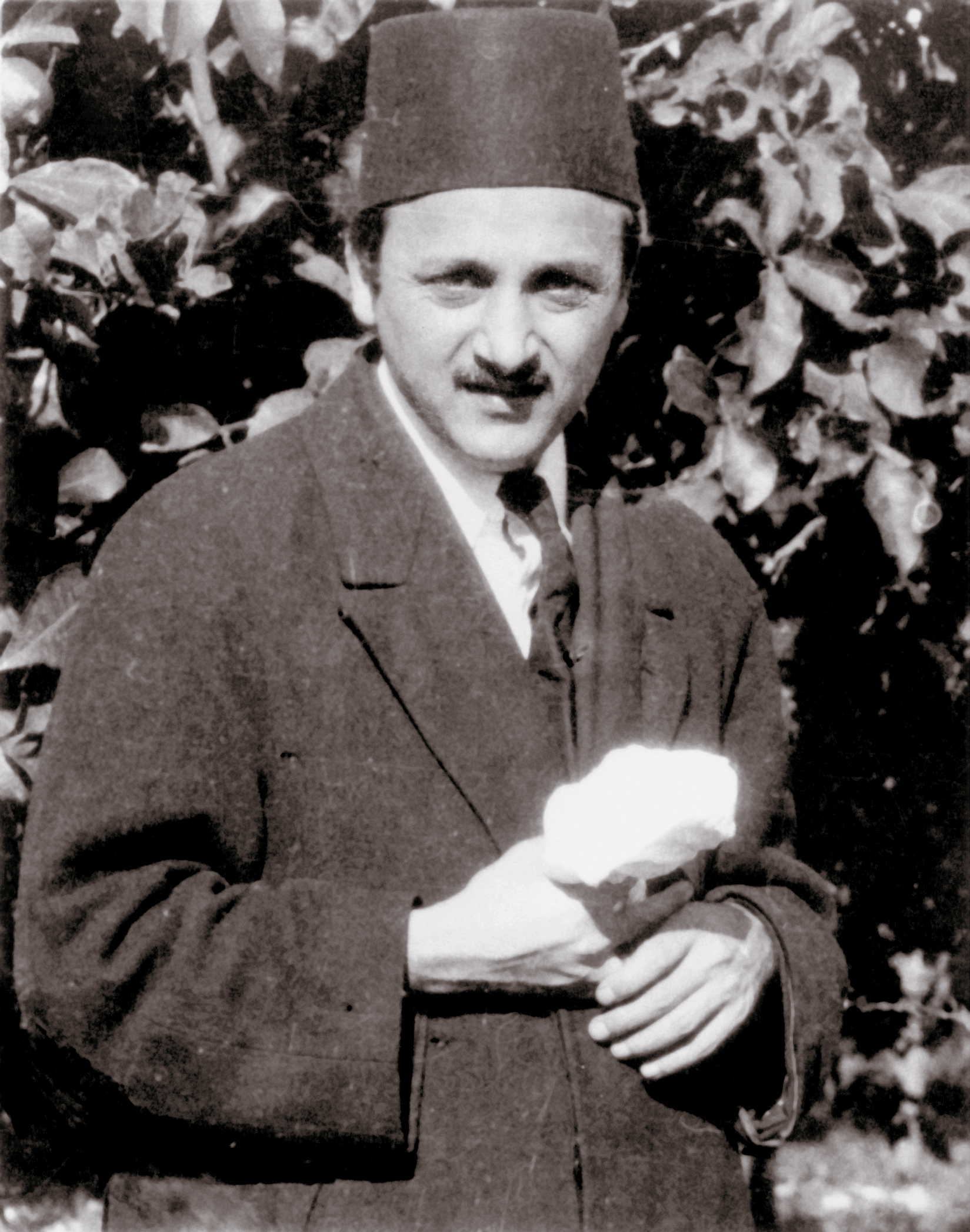
Shoghi Effendi at the time of becoming Guardian in 1921. Taken in Haifa.

The history of the religion in Kenya has an interesting precursor. Before joining the religion, Richard St. Barbe Baker served in the country in 1920 under the Colonial Office as Assistant Conservator of Forests. There he saw the wide scale deforestation going on. While there he intervened in a case of a colonial officer against a Kikuyu worker - taking a blow aimed at the worker. The struggle would eventually alienate him from the service. He developed a plan for re-forestation where food crops were planted between rows of young native trees. Because of lack of funds St. Barbe consulted with the Kenyans themselves, approaching the Kikuyu Chiefs and Elders, and together they arranged for three thousand tribal warriors to come to his camp and with the assistance of the Chiefs fifty were selected to be the first Men of the Trees. They promised before Ngai, the High God, that they would protect the native forest, plant ten native trees each year, and take care of trees everywhere. Immediately then leaving Kenya, St. Barbe offered a paper at a Congress of Living Religions in the Commonwealth about the Bantu religion following which he was introduced to the Baháʼí Faith because of "his genuine interest in another's religion struck a sympathetic chord with the Baháʼí principles."

At the other extreme of the continent the Baháʼí Faith in South Africa struggled with issues under the segregated social pattern and laws of Apartheid in South Africa. The Baháʼí community decided that instead of dividing the South African Baháʼí community into two population groups, one black and one white, they instead limited membership in the Baháʼí administration to black adherents, and placed the entire Baháʼí community under the leadership of its black population. In 1997 the National Spiritual Assembly presented a Statement to the Truth and Reconciliation Commission of South Africa which said in part:

Abhorring all forms of prejudice and rejecting any system of segregation, the Baháʼí Faith was introduced on a one to one basis and the community quietly grew during the apartheid years, without publicity. Despite the nature of the politics of that time, we presented our teachings on unity and the oneness of humankind to prominent individuals in politics, commerce and academia and leaders of thought including State Presidents.... [b]oth individual Baháʼís and our administrative institutions were continually watched by the security police.... Our activities did not include opposition to the previous Government for involvement in partisan politics and opposition to government are explicitly prohibited by the sacred Texts of our Faith.... During the time when the previous Government prohibited integration within our communities, rather than divide into separate administrative structures for each population group, we opted to limit membership of the Baháʼí Administration to the black adherents who were and remain in the majority of our membership and thereby placed the entire Baháʼí community under the stewardship of its black membership.... The pursuit of our objectives of unity and equality has not been without costs. The "white" Baháʼís were often ostracized by their white neighbours for their association with "non-whites". The Black Baháʼís were subjected to scorn by their black compatriots for their lack of political action and their complete integration with their white Baháʼí brethren.

To the west the Baháʼí Faith in Morocco began about 1946.

Wide-scale growth in the religion across Sub-Saharan Africa was observed to begin in the 1950s and extend in the 1960s. In 1953 the Baháʼís initiated a Ten Year Crusade during which a number of Baháʼís pioneered to various parts of Africa following the requests of ʻAbdu'l-Bahá. It was emphasized that western pioneers be self-effacing and focus their efforts not on the colonial leadership but on the native Africans - and that the pioneers must show by actions the sincerity of their sense of service to the Africans in bringing the religion and then the Africans who understand their new religion were to be given freedom to rise up and spread the religion according to their own sensibilities and the pioneers to disperse or step into the background. Among the figures of the religion in Africa the most senior African historically would be Enoch Olinga. In 1953 he became the first Baháʼí pioneer to British Cameroon, (moving from Uganda) and was given the title Knight of Baháʼu'lláh for that country. Ali Nakhjavani, and his wife along with Olinga and two other Baháʼís travelled from Uganda to Cameroon - the other Baháʼís were dropped along the way in other countries. As the number of Baháʼís grew in Cameroon new Baháʼís left the immediate region to pioneer in other surrounding areas, each becoming a Knight of Baháʼu'lláh including Ghana, and Togo. Because of the successive waves of people becoming Knights of Baháʼu'lláh, Enoch Olinga was entitled "Abd'l-Futuh", a Persian name meaning "the father of victories" by Shoghi Effendi. He was appointed as the youngest Hand of the Cause, the highest appointed position in the religion. A biography published in 1984 examined his impact in Cameroon and beyond.

=== Under the Universal House of Justice ===
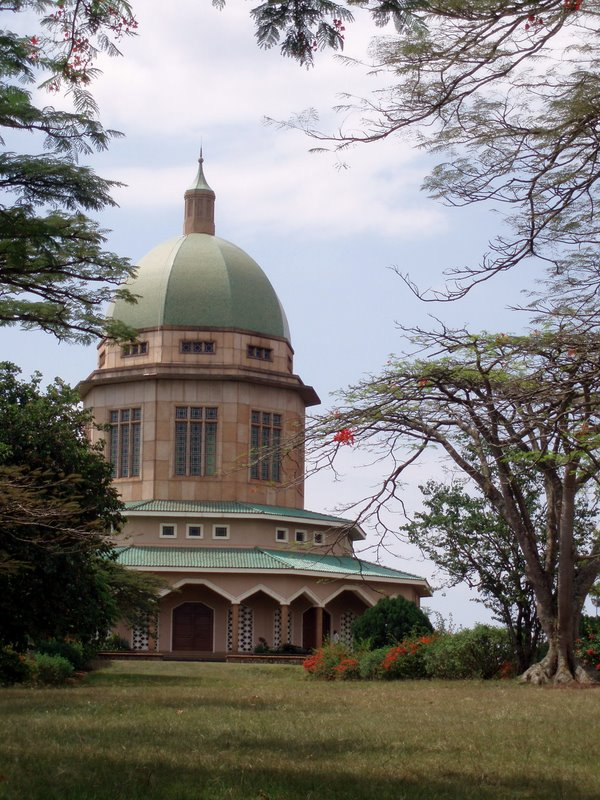
Baháʼí House of Worship, Kampala, Uganda.

Troubles characterize the experience of the Baháʼís across the Saharan countries. In 1960 with a regime change in Egypt, the Baháʼís lost all rights as an organized religious community by Law 263 at the decree of then-President Gamal Abdel Nasser which specified a minimum sentence of six months' imprisonment or a fine for any organized activities of the Baháʼís. All Baháʼí community properties, including Baháʼí centers, libraries, and cemeteries, were confiscated by the government except the cemetery Al-Rawda Al-Abadeyya. In obedience to the government is a core principal of the religion. In 1963 the arrests of Baháʼís in Morocco had gotten attention from Hassan II of Morocco, US Senator Kenneth B. Keating and Roger Nash Baldwin, then Chairman of the International League for the Rights of Man and would echo in analyses of politics of Morocco for years to come.

South of the Sahara it was a different story. Wide-scale growth in the religion across Sub-Saharan Africa was observed to begin in the 1950s and extend in the 1960s. The foundation stone of the Baháʼí House of Worship in Uganda was laid in January 1958, and it was dedicated on January 13, 1961. The building is more than 130 feet (39 m) high, and over 100 meters in diameter at the base. The green dome is made of fixed mosaic tiles from Italy, and the lower roof tiles are from Belgium. The walls of the temple are of precast stone quarried in Uganda. The colored glass in the wall panels was brought from Germany. The timber used for making the doors and benches was from Uganda. The 50-acre (200,000 m^{2}) property includes the House of Worship, extensive gardens, a guest house, and an administrative center. Hand of the Cause Rúhíyyih Khanum and then chairman of the central regional National Assembly Ali Nakhjavani embarked on 15 days of visiting Baháʼís through Uganda and Kenya including seeing three regional conferences on the progress of the religion, staying in homes of fellow believers, and other events. She talked to audiences about the future of African Baháʼís and their role in the religion. She visited Africa again on several trips from 1969 to 1973. In Ethiopia she was received by Haile Selassie I of Ethiopia. In the half hour interview she communicated how she had long admired him because of the way he had conducted himself in the face of the many trials and hardships of his life, and by the way he had overcome them. Selassie gave her a gold medal from his Coronation.

These two regions - north and central Africa - interacted closely in the 1970s. As part of a sweep across several Sub-Saharan countries, the Baháʼí Faith was banned in the 1970s in several countries: Burundi 1974; Mali 1976; Uganda 1977; Congo 1978; Niger 1978. Uganda had had the largest Baháʼí community in Africa at the time.

"This was principally the result of a campaign by a number of Arab countries. Since these countries were also by this time providers of development aid, this overt attack on the Baha'is was supported by covert moves such as linking the aid money to a particular country to the action that it took against the Baha'is. This was partially successful and a number of countries did ban the Baha'is for a time. However, the Baha'is were able to demonstrate to these governments that they were not agents of Zionism nor anti-Islamic and succeeded in having the ban reversed in all of these countries except Niger." (Niger lifted their restrictions in the 1990s.)

The Baháʼí Faith is currently the third largest international religion in Chad and Kenya.

More recently the roughly 2000 Baháʼís of Egypt have been embroiled in the Egyptian identification card controversy from 2006 through 2009. Since then there have been homes burned down and families driven out of towns. On the other hand, Sub-Saharan Baháʼís were able to mobilize for regional conferences called for by the Universal House of Justice 20 October 2008 to celebrate recent achievements in grassroots community-building and to plan their next steps in organizing in their home areas. Resulting conferences were held in:

- Lusaka, Zambia was first (among the 750 participants, 550 were from Zambia, 80 from Zimbabwe and 120 from Malawi.)
- Nakuru, Kenya, (700 Kenyans, 200 Baháʼís from Uganda, 100 from Tanzania, and 42 from Ethiopia, four came from Mozambique and three from Southern Sudan.)
- Johannesburg, South Africa, (expecting a maximum of 850 people, but more than 1,000 came the first day and about 1,150 the second day.)
- Bangui, Central African Republic, (planned for 200 or 300 people but realized early on that they might get double or triple that number. The revised estimates turned out to be correct – when the Bahaʼis arrived, the conference hall was overflowing with 831 people.)
- Uvira, Democratic Republic of the Congo, (with a war close at hand 776 people from attending with 13 people were able to make it from Burundi and four from Rwanda.)
- Lubumbashi, Democratic Republic of the Congo, (more than 1,000 attending.)
- Yaoundé, Cameroon, (some 1,200 participants included 90 from Chad, 45 from Congo, 18 from Equatorial Guinea, 20 from Gabon, and 10 from São Tomé and Príncipe, with a high percentage of those attending were youth, ages 12 to 22. )
- Abidjan, Côte d'Ivoire, (1,200 participants including people from Gambia, Guinea, Liberia, Mali, Senegal, and Sierra Leone attended.)
- Accra, Ghana, (about 950 participants were from Ghana itself, joined by 156 Bahaʼis from Benin, 140 from Burkina Faso, four from Cape Verde, three from Guinea Bissau, 106 from Niger, 137 from Nigeria and about 200 from Togo.)

== By country ==
=== Central Africa ===
==== Cameroon ====
The Baháʼí Faith in Cameroon was established when the country was separated into two colonies – British and French Cameroon. The first Baháʼí in Cameroon was Enoch Olinga, who had left his homeland of Uganda to bring the religion to British Cameroon in 1953. Meherangiz Munsiff, a young Indian woman who had moved from Britain, arrived in French Cameroon April 1954 – both Olinga and Munsiff were honoured with the title Knight of Baháʼu'lláh. Currently there are 40,000 adherents of the religion in the country.

==== Chad ====
Though the Baháʼí Faith in Chad began after its independence in 1960 members of the religion were present in associated territories since 1953. The Baháʼís of Chad elected their first National Spiritual Assembly in 1971. Through succeeding decades Baháʼís have been active in a number of ways and by some counts have become the third largest international religion in Chad with over 80300 members by 2000 and 96800 in 2005.

==== Democratic Republic of the Congo ====
The Baháʼí Faith in Democratic Republic of the Congo begins after ʻAbdu'l-Bahá wrote letters encouraging taking the religion to Africa in 1916. The first Baháʼí to settle in the country came in 1953 from Uganda. The first Baháʼí Local Spiritual Assembly of the country was elected in 1957. By 1963 there were 143 local assemblies in Congo. Even though the religion was banned, and the country torn by wars, the religion grew so that in 2003 there were some 541 assemblies. The Association of Religion Data Archives (relying mostly on the World Christian Encyclopedia) estimated some 252,000 Baháʼís in 2005. A Baháʼí House of Worship was opened in Kinshasa in 2023.

==== Equatorial Guinea ====
The Baháʼí Faith in Equatorial Guinea begins after ʻAbdu'l-Bahá wrote letters encouraging taking the religion to Africa in 1916. The first pioneer to Spanish Guinea was Elise Lynelle (then Elise Schreiber,) who arrived in Bata, Spanish Guinea (as it was called then), on 17 May 1954, and was recognized as a Knight of Baha'u'llah. In 1968 the first Local Spiritual Assembly of Equatorial Guinea was elected in Santa Isabel, (later renamed Malabo). The community has elected a National Spiritual Assembly since 1984. The community celebrated its golden jubilee in 2004. The Association of Religion Data Archives estimated nearly 2500 Baháʼís in 2005.

=== East Africa ===
==== Burundi ====
The Baháʼí Faith in Burundi begins after 1916 with a mention by ʻAbdu'l-Bahá, then head of the religion, that Baháʼís should take the religion to the regions of Africa. The first specific mention of Burundi (Urundi) was in May 1953 suggesting the expanding community of the Baháʼí Faith in Uganda look at sending pioneers to neighboring areas like Burundi(Urundi) as part of a specific plan of action. The first settlers of the religion arrived in the region by June. By 1963 there were three Baháʼí Local Spiritual Assemblies in Burundi-Ruanda. Through succeeding organizations of the countries in the region, the National Spiritual Assembly of Burundi was first formed in 1969 but was successively dissolved and reformed a number of times - most recently reforming in 2011. Even though the religion was banned for a time, and the country torn by wars, the religion grew so that in 2005 the Association of Religion Data Archives (relying on World Christian Encyclopedia) estimated just about 6,800 Baháʼís in Burundi.

==== Ethiopia ====
The Baháʼí Faith in Ethiopia begins after ʻAbdu'l-Bahá wrote letters encouraging taking the religion to Africa in 1916. It is not known who the first Baháʼí was to settle in the country, but the first Baháʼí Local Spiritual Assembly of the country was elected November 1934 in Addis Ababa. In 1962 Ethiopia Baháʼís had elected a National Spiritual Assembly. By 1963 there were seven localities with smaller groups of Baháʼís in the country. The Association of Religion Data Archives estimated some 27,000 Baháʼís in 2005. The community celebrated its diamond jubilee in January 2009.

==== Kenya ====
The Baháʼí Faith in Kenya began with three individuals. First, Richard St. Barbe Baker took a constructive engagement with the indigenous religion of Kenyans to a United Kingdom conference on religions, where, in sympathy with his efforts, he was presented with the Baháʼí Faith and became a convert. The second individual was Enoch Olinga who traveled to Kenya when he served in the British Royal Army Educational Corps. The third came twenty-one years after the first and marked the arrival of the Baháʼí Faith in Kenya. In 1945 Mrs. Marguerite Preston (née Wellby) arrived in Kenya. She had been a member of the National Spiritual Assembly of the United Kingdom from 1939 through 1945 when she married a Kenyan tea grower and moved to Kenya where the couple had three children within two years and she was the only Baháʼí in the nation. The Association of Religion Data Archives (relying on World Christian Encyclopedia) estimated about 429,000 Baháʼís in Kenya in 2005. A local Bahá'í House of Worship was opened on Sunday, 23 May 2021 in Matunda Soy, Kenya.

==== Madagascar ====
The Baháʼí Faith in Madagascar begins with the mention by ʻAbdu'l-Bahá, then head of the religion, who asked the followers of the Baháʼí Faith to travel to Madagascar. The first Baháʼí to pioneer to Madagascar arrived in 1953 and following native converts the first Baháʼí Local Spiritual Assembly was elected in 1955. By 1963 in addition to the one assembly there were groups of Baháʼís living in four other locations. In late July 1967 Rúhíyyih Khanum became the first Hand of the Cause to visit the country. In 1972 the Malagasy Baháʼís gathered to elect the first National Spiritual Assembly of the Baháʼís of Madagascar. By 2003 there were 33 local assemblies and the Association of Religion Data Archives in 2005 estimated there were about 17,900 Baháʼís in the country.

==== Rwanda ====
The Baháʼí Faith in Rwanda begins after 1916 with a mention by ʻAbdu'l-Bahá, then head of the religion, that Baháʼís should take the religion to the regions of Africa. The first specific mention of Rwanda was in May 1953 suggesting the expanding community of the Baháʼí Faith in Uganda look at sending pioneers to neighboring areas like Ruanda. The first settlers of the religion arrived in the region by July 1953 when Baháʼís from the United States and Malawi arrived. By 1963 there were three Baháʼí Local Spiritual Assemblies in Burundi-Ruanda. Through succeeding organizations of the countries in the region, the National Spiritual Assembly of Rwanda was formed in 1972. Baháʼís, perhaps in the thousands, were among those who perished in the Rwandan genocide Following the disruption of the Rwandan Civil War the national assembly was reformed in 1997. The Baháʼís of Rwanda have continued to strive for inter-racial harmony, a teaching which Denyse Umutoni, an assistant director of Shake Hands with the Devil, mentions as among the reasons for her conversion to the religion. Recent estimates place the Baháʼí population around 15,000.

==== Tanzania ====
The Baháʼí Faith in Tanzania begins when the first pioneer, Claire Gung, arrived in 1950 in what was then called Tanganyika. With the first Tanganyikan to join the religion in 1952 the first Baháʼí Local Spiritual Assembly was elected in 1952 of Tanganyika in Dar es Salaam. In 1956 a regional Baháʼí Assembly which included Tanganyika was elected. Later each of the constituent countries successively formed their own independent Baháʼí National Spiritual Assembly and Tanganyika, with Zanzibar, formed its own in 1964 and it and the country was renamed Tanzania. Since 1986 the Baháʼís have operated the Ruaha Secondary School as a Baháʼí school. In 2005 Baháʼís were estimated at about 163,800 adherents.

==== Uganda ====
The Baháʼí Faith in Uganda started to grow in 1951 and in four years time there were 500 Baháʼís in 80 localities, including 13 Baháʼí Local Spiritual Assemblies, representing 30 tribes, and had dispatched 9 pioneers to other African locations. Following the reign of Idi Amin when the Baháʼí Faith was banned and the murder of Baháʼí Hand of the Cause Enoch Olinga and his family, the community continues to grow though estimates of the population range widely from 19,000 to 105,000. The community's involvements have included diverse efforts to promote the welfare of the Ugandan people. There is a Baháʼí House of Worship in Kampala, Uganda's capital, which was completed in 1961.

=== North Africa ===
==== Algeria ====
The Baháʼí Faith in Algeria dates from 1952. Though the religion achieved some growth and organization through 1967 including converts, the period of the independence of Algeria when the country adopted Islamic practices in rejection of colonial influences, subsequently, the religion was effectively banned in 1968. However, more recently the Association of Religion Data Archives and Wolfram Alpha estimated the population of Baháʼís at 3.3–3.8 thousand Baháʼís in 2005 and 2010.

==== Egypt ====
The Baháʼí Faith in Egypt has a history over a century old. Perhaps the first Baháʼís arrive in 1863. Baháʼu'lláh, founder of the religion, was himself briefly in Egypt in 1868 when on his way to imprisonment in ʻAkká. The first Egyptians were converts by 1896. Despite forming an early Baháʼí Local Spiritual Assembly and forming a National Assembly, in 1960, following a regime change, the Baháʼís lost all rights as an organised religious community by Law 263 at the decree of then-President Gamal Abdel Nasser. However, in 1963, there were still seven organized communities in Egypt. More recently, the roughly 2,000 Baháʼís of Egypt have been embroiled in the Egyptian identification card controversy from 2006 through 2009. There have been homes burned down and families driven out of towns.

==== Morocco ====
The Baháʼí Faith in Morocco began about 1946. In 1953, the Baháʼís initiated a Ten Year Crusade during which a number of Baháʼís pioneered to various parts of Morocco – many of whom came from Egypt and a few from the United States including Helen Elsie Austin. By April 1955, the first Baháʼí Local Spiritual Assembly of Ceuta was elected. By January 1958, the first Baháʼí summer school was held in Rabat. By spring 1958, the Baháʼí population may have been 100 and there were six assemblies and a regional committee coordinated activities promulgating the religion. In 1960, the first all-Moroccan local assembly was elected in Zaouiat Cheikh and most of its members were Berbers. On 7 December 1961, an article in Al Alam laments the decline of Islam and attacks the Baháʼís. During the year, Baháʼí homes are entered by police and literature of the religion is confiscated. On 12 April, four Baháʼís are arrested in Nador. A regional National Spiritual Assembly of North West Africa was organized which included Morocco in 1962. In 1963, a survey of the community counted 10 Assemblies, 12 organized groups (between 1 and 9 adults) of Baháʼís. In 1963, the arrests in Morocco had got attention from Hassan II of Morocco, US Senator Kenneth B. Keating and Roger Nash Baldwin, then Chairman of the International League for the Rights of Man and would echo in analyses of politics of Morocco for years to come. All Baháʼí meetings were prohibited in 1983 followed by arrests. This time, the response emphasized the non-partisan and obedience to government principles of the religion. 1992 estimates by the US Department of State counted some 150–200 Baháʼís. while 2001 through 2009 estimates mention the Baháʼí community at 350 to 400 persons. However Association of Religion Data Archives and Wolfram Alpha estimated 30,000 Baháʼís in 2005 and 2010, the third largest religion in the country.

==== Tunisia ====
The Baháʼí Faith in Tunisia begins circa 1910 when the first Baháʼí arrives, possibly from Egypt. In 1956 at Ridván, a marked holy day of the religion and a day on which major elections are held, three new Regional Spiritual Assemblies were established including that of North-West Africa with the chairmanship of Enoch Olinga In 1963 a survey of the community counted 1 assembly and 18 organized groups (between 1 and 9 adults) of Baháʼís in Tunisia. US State Department 2001 estimates mention the Baháʼí community at about 150 persons. However Association of Religion Data Archives and several other sources point to over 1000 Baháʼís in the country.

=== Southern Africa ===
==== Angola ====
The Baháʼí Faith in Angola begins after ʻAbdu'l-Bahá wrote letters encouraging taking the religion to Africa in 1916. The first Baháʼí pioneered to Angola about 1952. By 1963 there was a Baháʼí Local Spiritual Assembly in Luanda and smaller groups of Baháʼís in other cities. In 1992 the Baháʼís of Angola elected their first National Spiritual Assembly. The Association of Religion Data Archives (relying mostly on the World Christian Encyclopedia) estimated some 1800 Baháʼís in 2005.

==== Botswana ====
The Baháʼí Faith in Botswana begins after ʻAbdu'l-Bahá wrote letters encouraging taking the religion to Africa in 1916. The first Baháʼís pioneered to Botswana about October 1954 where they befriended many Africans. By 1963 there were two assemblies; seven groups, and one isolated member. The first election of Botswana's Baháʼí National Spiritual Assembly was in 1970. The Association of Religion Data Archives (relying mostly on the World Christian Encyclopedia) estimated some 16000 Baháʼís in 2005.

==== Malawi ====
The Baháʼí Faith in Malawi begins before the country achieved independence. Before World War I the area of modern Malawi was part of Nyasaland and ʻAbdu'l-Bahá, then head of the religion, asked the followers of the Baháʼí Faith to travel to the regions of Africa. As part of a wide scale growth in the religion across Sub-Saharan Africa the religion was introduced into this region the same year it became known as the Federation of Rhodesia and Nyasaland in 1953. A decade later there were five Baháʼí Local Spiritual Assemblies. By 1970, now in the country of Malawi, there were 12 Local Spiritual Assemblies and a National Spiritual Assembly. Between 2000 and 2003 there were estimates of 15 to 24,500 Baháʼís in Malawi.

==== Mozambique ====
The Baháʼí Faith in Mozambique begins after the mention of Africa in Baháʼí literature when ʻAbdu'l-Bahá suggested it as a place to take the religion to in 1916. The first known Baháʼí to enter the region was in 1951–2 at Beira when a British pioneer came through on the way to what was then Rhodesia, now Zimbabwe. The Mozambique Baháʼí community participated in successive stages of regional organization across southern Africa from 1956 through the election of its first Mozambique's Baháʼí Local Spiritual Assembly by 1963 and on to its own National Spiritual Assembly was elected in 1987. Since 1984 the Baháʼís have begun to hold development projects. The Association of Religion Data Archives (relying on World Christian Encyclopedia) estimated just over 2,500 Baháʼís in 2005.

==== South Africa ====
The Baháʼí Faith in South Africa began with the holding of Baháʼí meetings in the country in 1911. A small population of Baháʼís remained until 1950 when large numbers of international Baháʼí pioneers settled in South Africa. In 1956, after members of various tribes in South Africa became Baháʼís, a regional Baháʼí Assembly which included South Africa was elected. Later each of the constituent countries successively formed their own independent Baháʼí National Spiritual Assembly. Then in 1995, after a prolonged period of growth and oppression during Apartheid and the homelands reuniting with South Africa, the Baháʼí National Spiritual Assembly of South Africa was formed. Following the end of Apartheid the South African Baháʼí community continued to grow; currently there are around of 250,000 Baháʼís in South Africa.

==== Zambia ====
The Baháʼí Faith population of Zambia has been estimated at over 162,443, or 1.70% of the population. Based on that data, Adherents.com ranks this as the sixteenth-highest national proportion of Baháʼís in the world. It also ranks Zambia's as the tenth-largest national Baháʼí community in the world in absolute terms, and the fourth-largest in Africa. The William Mmutle Masetlha Foundation, an organization founded in 1995 and run by the Zambian Baháʼí community, is particularly active in areas such as literacy and primary health care. The Maseltha Institute, its parent organization, was founded earlier in 1983.

==== Zimbabwe ====
In 1916–1917 a series of letters by ʻAbdu'l-Bahá, then head of the religion, asked the followers of the religion to take the religion to regions of Africa; these letters were compiled together in the book titled Tablets of the Divine Plan. In 1929 Shoghi Effendi, then head of the religion, was the first Baháʼí to visit the area. In 1953 several Baháʼís settled in what was then South Rhodesia as pioneers. Along with indigenous conversions in 1955 the Baháʼís formed the first Baháʼí Local Spiritual Assembly was formed in Harare. By the end of 1963 there were 9 assemblies. While still a colony of the United Kingdom, the Baháʼís nevertheless organized a separate National Spiritual Assembly in 1964. Though Rhodesia declared independence in 1965, succeeding political developments and wars changed the status of the country and the National Assembly was reformed and has continued since 1970 while Zimbabwe regained independence in 1980. By 2003, the 50th anniversary of the Baháʼís in Zimbabwe, a year of events across the country culminated with a conference of Baháʼís from all provinces of Zimbabwe and nine countries. There were 43 local spiritual assemblies in 2003.

=== West Africa ===
==== Liberia ====
The Baháʼí Faith in Liberia begins with the entrance of the first member of the religion in 1952 and the first Baháʼí Local Spiritual Assembly in 1958 in Monrovia. By the end of 1963 there were five assemblies and Liberian Baháʼís elected their first National Spiritual Assembly in 1975. Hosting various conferences through the '70s the community was somewhat disrupted by the First Liberian Civil War with some refugees going to Côte d'Ivoire in 1990 and the re-establishment of the National Spiritual Assembly in 1998. Third parties invited the modern Baháʼí community into their dialogues in the country while Baháʼís have continued their work supporting a private Baháʼí school, the Baháʼí Academy and a private radio station. Almost 9,500 Baháʼís are believed to have been in Liberia in 2006.

==== Niger ====
The Baháʼí Faith in Niger began during a period of large-scale growth in the religion across Sub-Saharan Africa near the end of its colonial period. The first Baháʼís arrived in Niger in 1966 and the growth of the religion reached a point of electing its National Spiritual Assembly in 1975. Following a period of oppression, making the institutions of the religion illegal in the late 1970s and 80's, the National Assembly was re-elected starting in 1992. The Baháʼí community in Niger has grown mostly in the south-west of the country where they number in the low thousands.

==== Nigeria ====
After an isolated presence in the late 1920s, the Baháʼí Faith in Nigeria begins with Baháʼí pioneers coming to Sub-Saharan West Africa in the 1950s especially following the efforts of Enoch Olinga who directly and indirectly affected the growth of the religion in Nigeria. Following growth across West Africa a regional National Spiritual Assembly was elected in 1956. As the community multiplied across cities and became diverse in its engagements it elected its own National Spiritual Assembly by 1979 and had 1,000 Baháʼís in 2001.

==== Senegal ====
The Baháʼí Faith in Senegal begins after ʻAbdu'l-Bahá, the son of the founder of the religion, mentioned Africa as a place the religion should be more broadly visited by Baháʼís. The first to set foot in the territory of French West Africa that would become Senegal arrived in 1953. The first Baháʼí Local Spiritual Assembly of Senegal was elected in 1966 in Dakar. In 1975 the Baháʼí community elected the first National Spiritual Assembly of Senegal. The most recent estimate, by the Association of Religion Data Archives in a 2005 report details the population of Senegalese Baháʼís at 22,000. Baháʼís claimed there are 34 local assemblies in 2003.

== See also ==
- Baháʼí Faith by country
- History of the Baháʼí Faith
- Religion in Africa
- Irreligion in Africa
- Buddhism in Africa
- Christianity in Africa
- Hinduism in Africa
- Islam in Africa
- History of the Jews in Africa
