= Religion in Africa =

Religion in Africa (2020 estimate)
1. Christianity (49.3%)
2. Islam (41.5%)
3. Traditional faiths (7.90%)
4. None / Other (1.30%)

Religion in Africa is multifaceted and has a major influence on art, culture and philosophy. Today, the continent's various populations and individuals are mostly adherents of Christianity, Islam, and to a lesser extent traditional African religions. In Christian or Islamic communities, religious beliefs are also sometimes characterized with syncretism with the beliefs and practices of traditional religions.

== Abrahamic religions ==
The majority of Africans are adherents of Christianity or Islam. African people often combine the practice of their traditional belief with the practice of Abrahamic religions. Abrahamic religions are widespread throughout Africa. They have both spread and replaced indigenous African religions, but are often adapted to African cultural contexts and belief systems. The World Book Encyclopedia estimated in 2002 that Christians formed 45% of the continent's population while Muslims formed 40%. Also in 2002, Encyclopædia Britannica estimated that Christians form 45% of Africa's population, with Muslims forming 40.6%.

=== Christianity ===
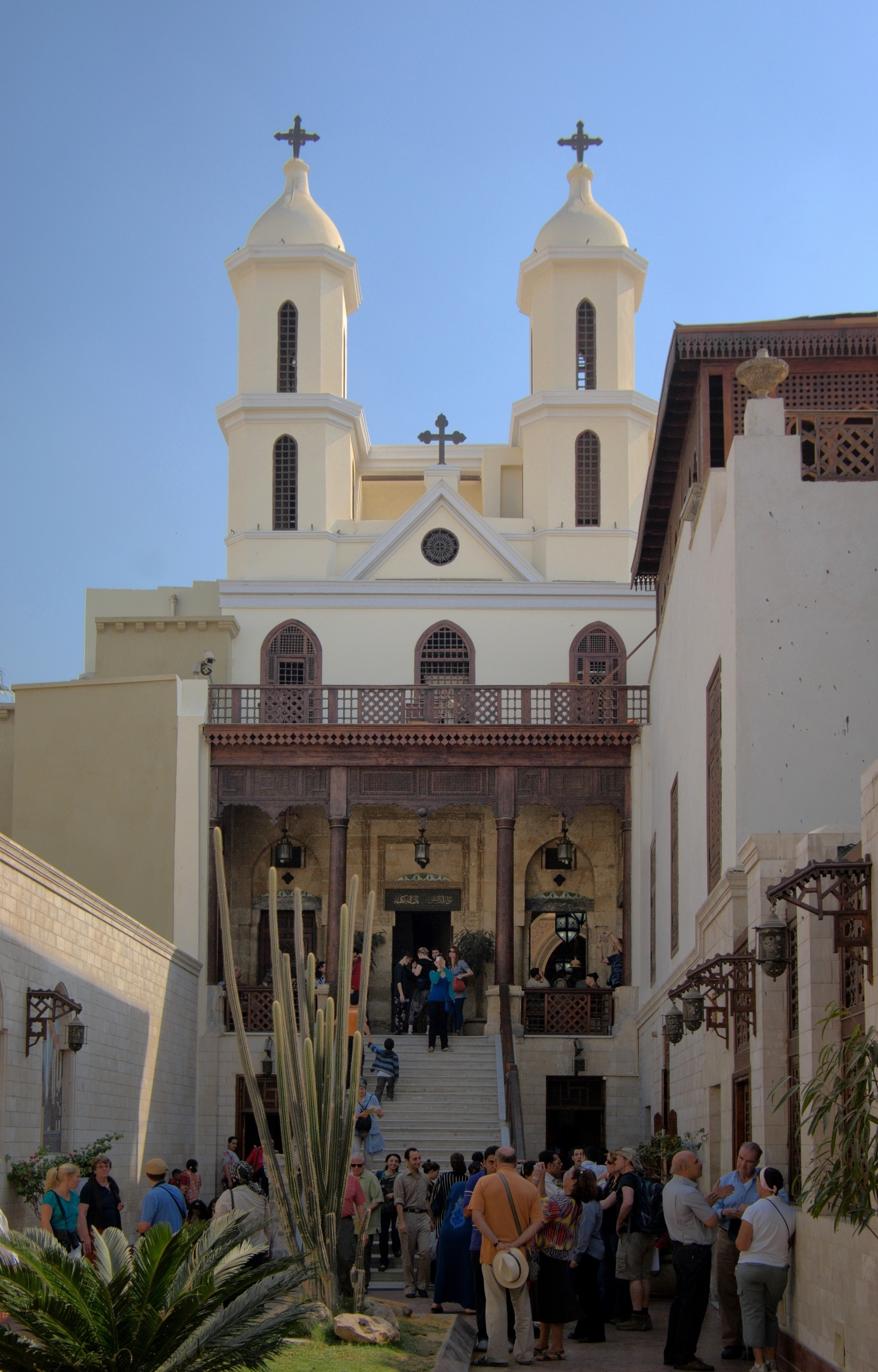
The Hanging Church of Cairo, Egypt.

Christianity is the most widely practiced religions along with Islam and is the largest religion in Africa. Several syncretistic and messianic sects have formed throughout much of the continent, including the Nazareth Baptist Church in South Africa and the Aladura churches in Nigeria. There is also fairly widespread populations of Seventh-day Adventists and Jehovah's Witnesses. The oldest Christian denominations in Africa are the Eastern Orthodox Church of Alexandria, the Coptic Orthodox Church of Alexandria, and the Ethiopian Orthodox Tewahedo Church and Eritrean Orthodox Tewahedo Church (which rose to prominence in the fourth century AD after King Ezana the Great made Ethiopia one of the first Christian nations.)

In the first few centuries of Christianity, Africa produced many figures who had a major influence outside the continent, including St Augustine of Hippo, St Maurice, Origen, Tertullian, and three Roman Catholic popes (Victor I, Miltiades and Gelasius I), as well as the Biblical characters Simon of Cyrene and the Ethiopian eunuch baptised by Philip the Evangelist. Christianity existed in Ethiopia before the rule of King Ezana the Great of the Kingdom of Axum, but the religion grasped a strong foothold when it was declared a state religion in 330 AD, becoming one of the first Christian nations.

The earliest and best known reference to the introduction of Christianity to Africa is mentioned in the Christian Bible's Acts of the Apostles, and pertains to the evangelist Phillip's conversion of an Ethiopian traveller in the 1st century AD. Although the Bible refers to them as Ethiopians, scholars have argued that Ethiopia was a common term encompassing the area South-Southeast of Egypt.

Other traditions have the convert as a Jew who was a steward in the Queen's court. All accounts do agree on the fact that the traveller was a member of the royal court who succeeded in converting the Queen, which in turn caused a church to be built. Tyrannius Rufinus, a noted church historian, also recorded a personal account as do other church historians such as Socrates and Sozemius.

Some experts predict the shift of Christianity's center from the European industrialized nations to Africa and Asia in modern times. Yale University historian Lamin Sanneh stated, that "African Christianity was not just an exotic, curious phenomenon in an obscure part of the world, but that African Christianity might be the shape of things to come." The statistics from the World Christian Encyclopedia (David Barrett) illustrate the emerging trend of dramatic Christian growth on the continent and supposes, that in 2025 there will be 633 million Christians in Africa.

A 2015 study estimates 2,161,000 Christian believers from a Muslim background in Africa, most of them belonging to some form of Protestantism.

=== Islam ===
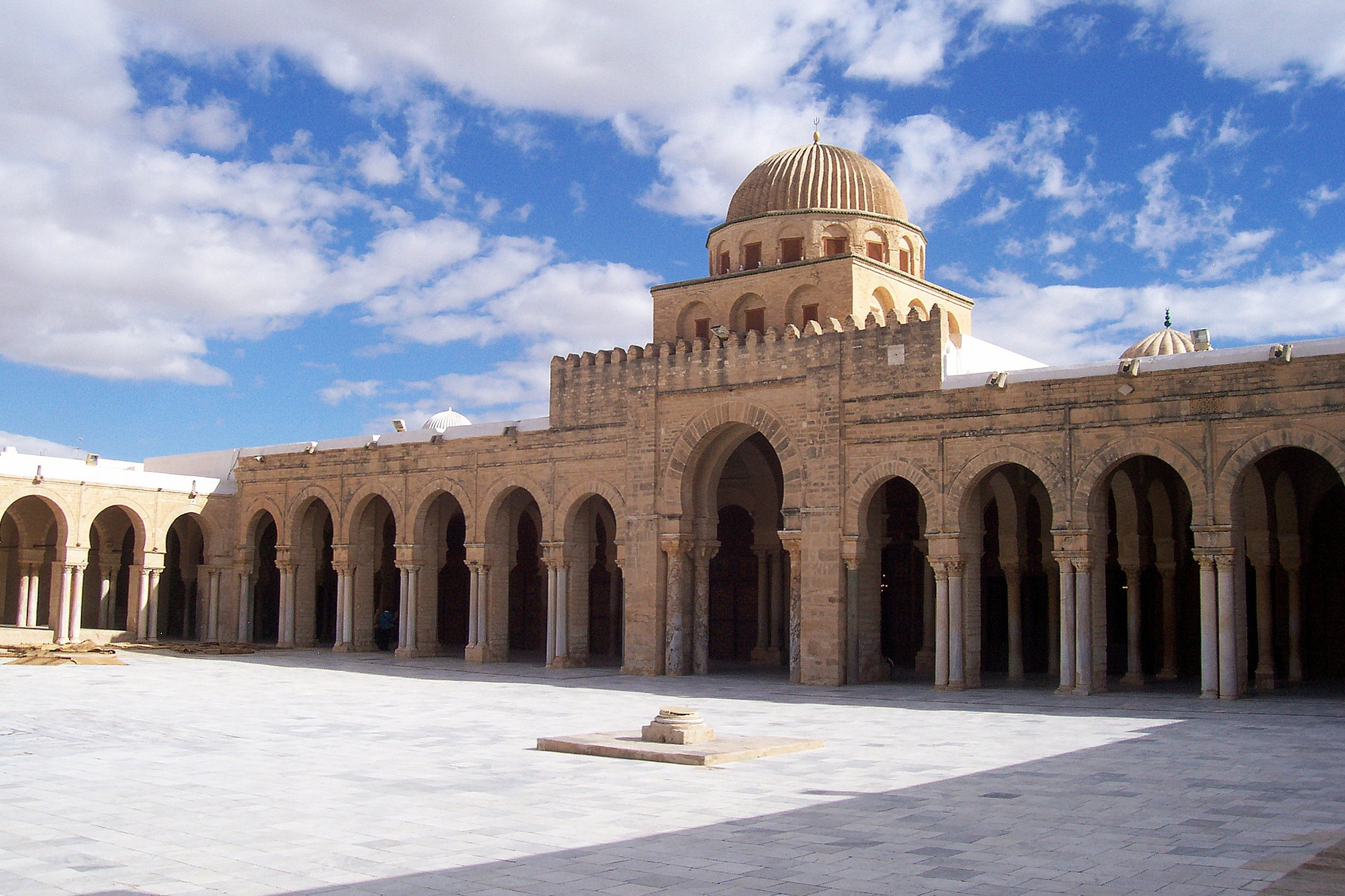
The Great Mosque of Kairouan, erected in 670 by the Arab general Uqba Ibn Nafi, is the oldest mosque in North Africa. Kairouan, Tunisia.

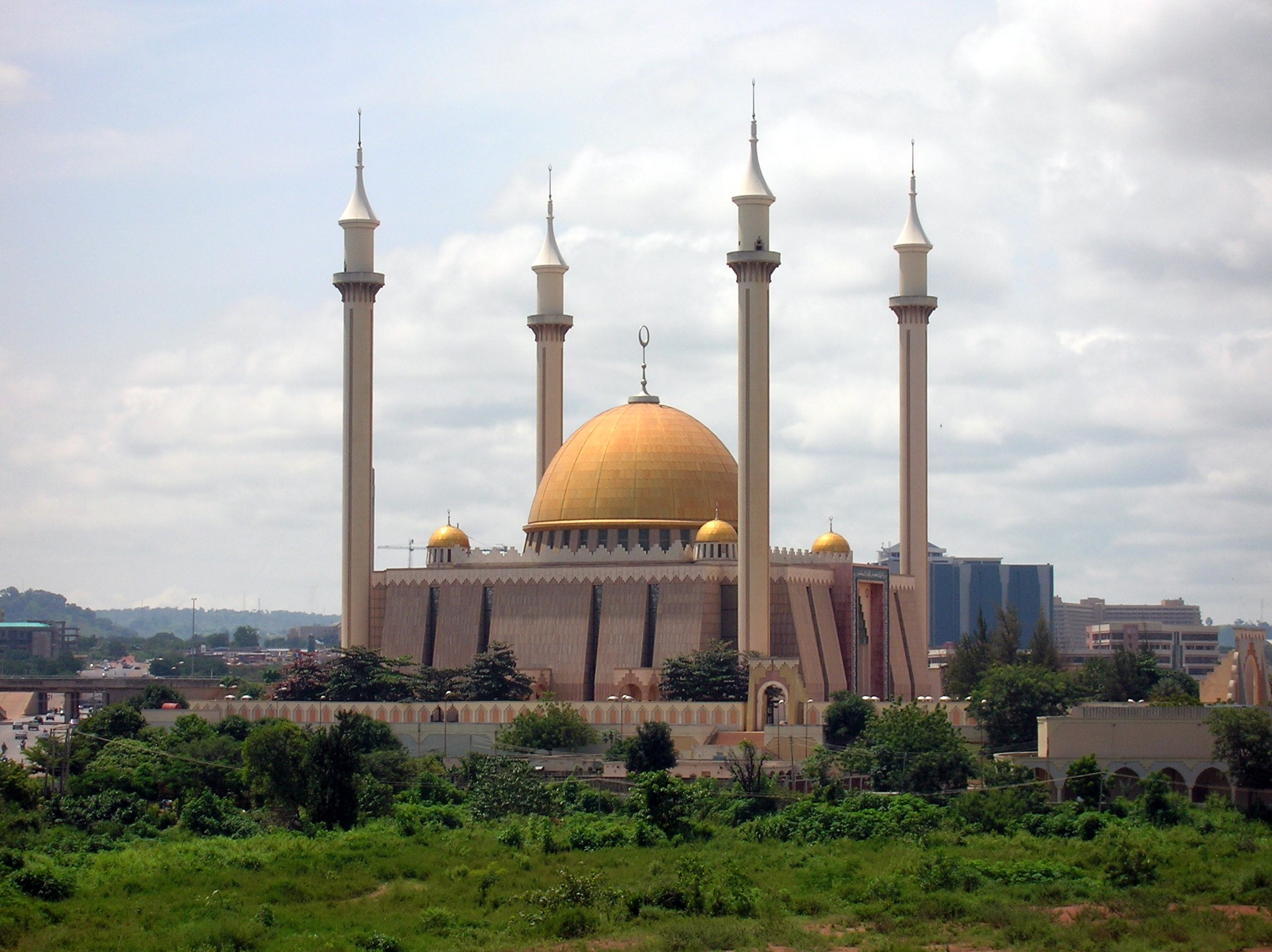
Abuja National Mosque in Nigeria.

Islam is the other major religion in Africa alongside Christianity, with over 40% of the population being Muslim, accounting for about one fourth of the world's Muslim population. The faith's historic roots on the continent stem from the time of Muhammad, whose early disciples migrated to Abyssinia (hijira) in fear of persecution from the pagan Arabs.

The spread of Islam in North Africa came with the expansion of Arab empire under Caliph Umar, through the Sinai Peninsula. The spread of Islam in West Africa was through Islamic traders and sailors. The religion had also began influencing Harla Kingdom in the Horn of Africa early on.

Islam is the dominant religion in North Africa and the Horn of Africa. It has also become the predominant religion on the Swahili Coast as well as the West African seaboard and parts of the interior. There have been several Muslim empires in Western Africa which exerted considerable influence, notably the Mali Empire, which flourished for several centuries and the Songhai Empire, under the leadership of Mansa Musa, Sunni Ali and Askia Mohammed.

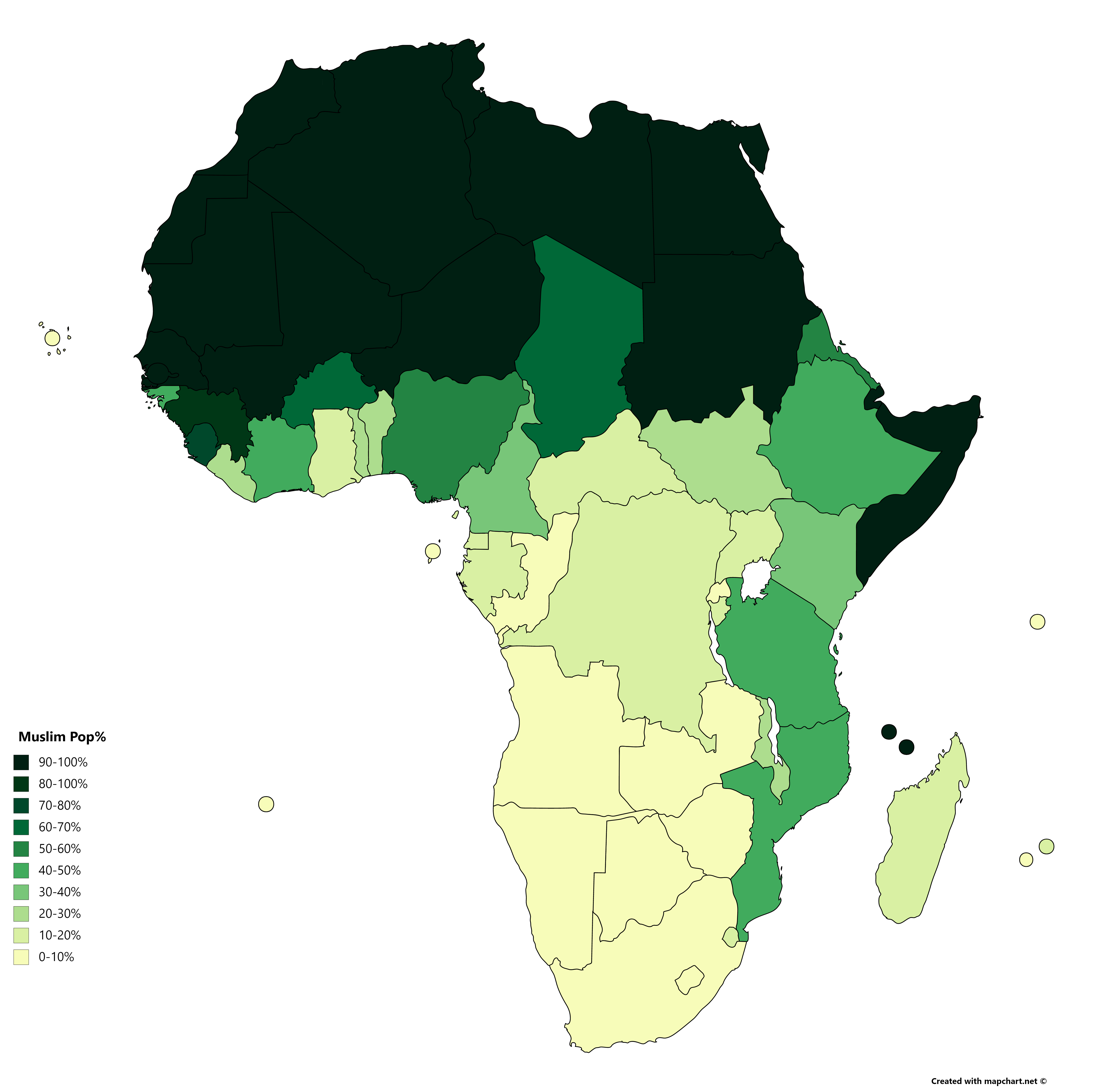
African countries by percentage of Muslim inhabitants

The vast majority of Muslims in Africa are followers of Sunni Islam. There are also small minorities of other sects.

=== Judaism ===
Adherents of Judaism can be found scattered in a number of countries across Africa; including North Africa, Ethiopia, Uganda, Kenya, Cameroon, Gabon, Ghana, Ivory Coast, Sierra Leone, Nigeria, Mali, and Southern Africa.

=== Baháʼí Faith ===
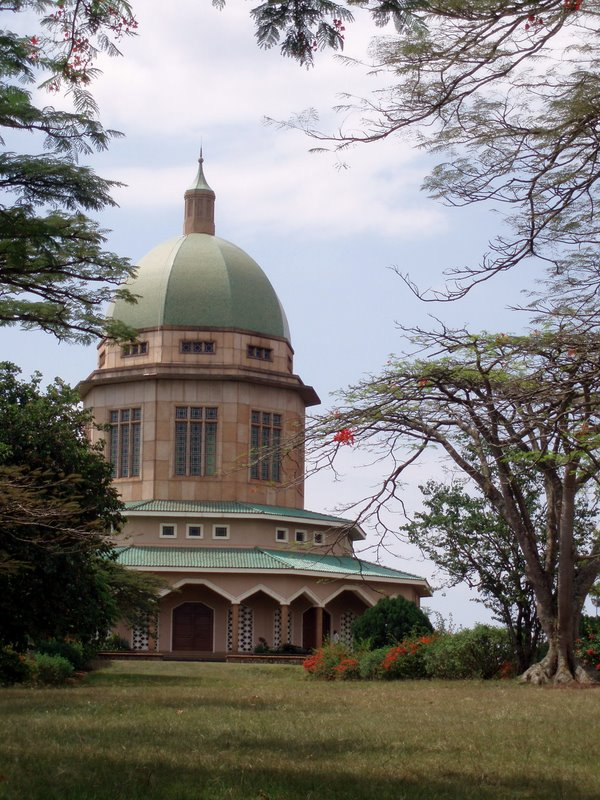
Baháʼí House of Worship, Kampala, Uganda.

The Baháʼí Faith in Africa has a diverse history. It especially had wide-scale growth in the 1950s which extended further in the 1960s. The Association of Religion Data Archives (relying on World Christian Encyclopedia) lists many large and smaller populations of Baháʼís in Africa with Kenya (#3: 512,900), the Democratic Republic of the Congo (#5: 282,900), South Africa (#8: 238,500) and Zambia (#10: 190,400) among the top ten numerical populations of Baháʼís in the world in 2010, and Mauritius (#4: 1.8% of population) joining Zambia (#3: 1.8%) and Kenya (#10: 1.0%) in the top ten in terms of percentage of the national population.

All three individual heads of the religion, Bahá'u'lláh, `Abdu'l-Bahá, and Shoghi Effendi, were in Africa at various times. More recently the roughly 2000 Baháʼís of Egypt have been embroiled in the Egyptian identification card controversy from 2006 through 2009. Since then there have been homes burned down and families driven out of towns. On the other hand, Baháʼís were able to mobilize for nine regional conferences called for by the Universal House of Justice on 20 October 2008 to celebrate recent achievements in grassroots community-building and to plan their next steps in organizing in their home areas.

== Traditional African religions ==
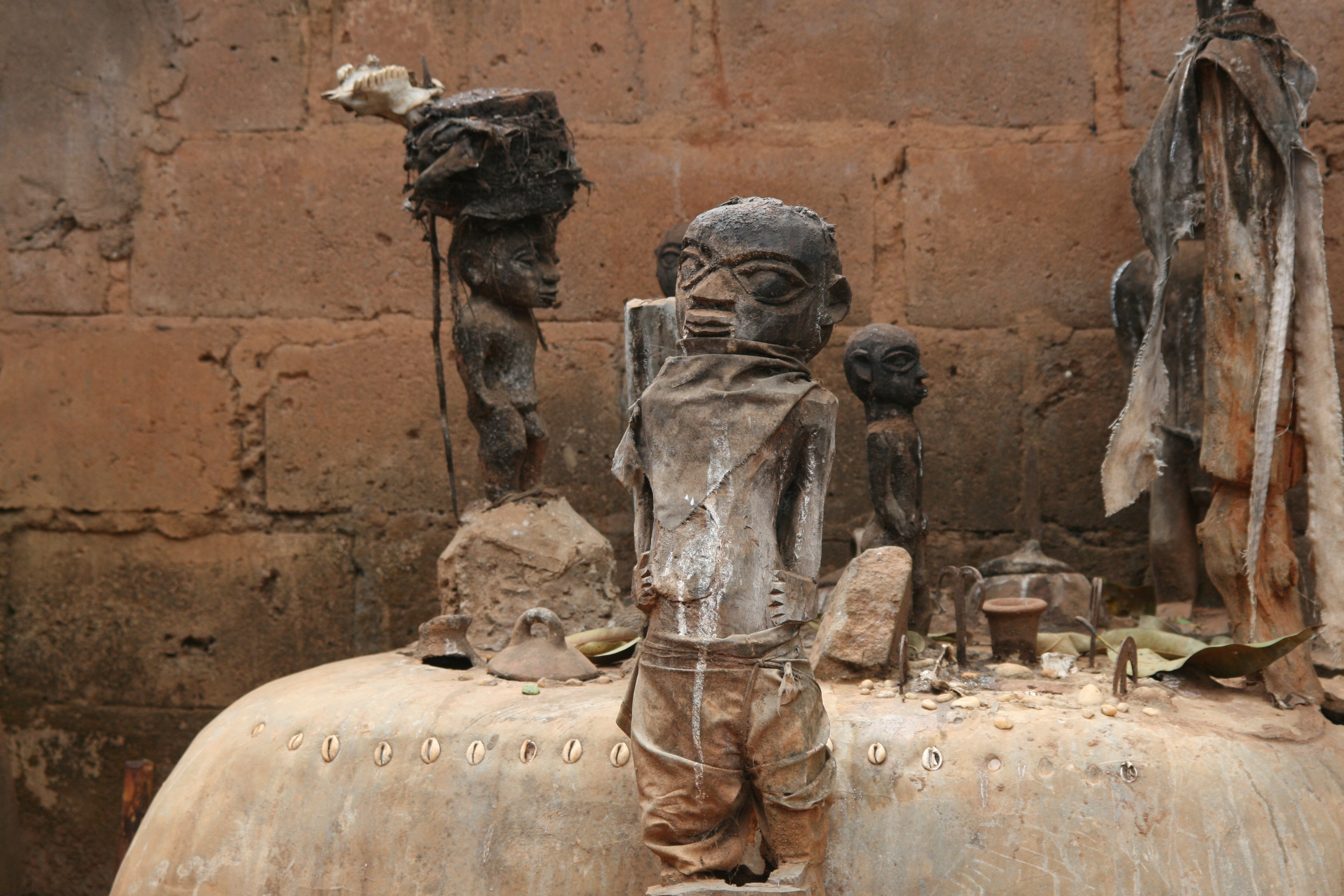
A Vodun altar in Abomey, Benin

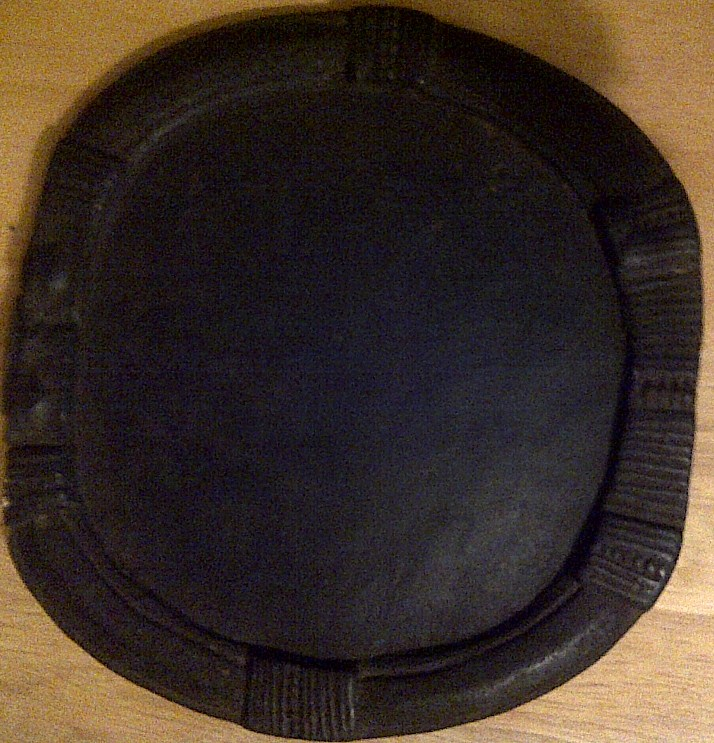
An early 20th-century Yoruba divination board

Africa is home to a wide variety of traditional beliefs. Although religious customs are sometimes shared by many local societies, they are usually unique to specific populations or geographic regions. All traditional African religions are united by a shared animistic core with special importance given to ancestor worship.

According to Dr. J. Omosade Awolalu, the "olden" in this context means indigenous, that which is foundational, handed down from generation to generation, meant to be upheld and practised today and into the future. Awolalu argues it is a heritage from the past, yet not treated as a thing of the past but that which connects the past with the present and the present with eternity.

Though often referred to in singular terms, Africa is a vast continent with many nations, each possessing complex cultures, numerous languages, and various dialects.

=== West African ===
This school of thought is based mainly on oral transmission; that which is written in people's hearts, minds, oral history, customs, temples and religious functions. It has no founders or leaders like Gautama Buddha, Jesus, or Muhammad. It has no missionaries or intent to propagate or proselytise. Among the African traditional religions are those of the Serer of Senegal, the Yoruba of Nigeria, and the Akan of Ghana and Ivory Coast, and the Bono of Ghana and Ivory Coast. The West African coast is also home to a syncretic religion formed from Yoruba religion and Anglicanism. The religion of the Gbe peoples (mostly the Ewe and Fon) of Benin, Togo and Ghana is called Vodun and is the main source for similarly named religions in the African diaspora, such as Louisiana Voodoo, Haitian Vodou, Cuban Vodú, Dominican Vudú and Brazilian Vodum.

=== East African ===
Some distinctions between West African and East African or Horn religion often include considering the supernatural and natural or tangible as being one and the same, and using this stance to incorporate divination. Clergymen from this region who would historically catechize to the masses were often referred to as waganga. Another distinction of East African and Horners is the greater prevalence of prophets within the oral traditions and other forms of generational transmissions of traditional African religion.

The most prominent indigenous deity among Cushitic Horners is Waaq, which continues to be revered into the modern era with religions such as Waaqeffanna and Waaqism. According to the author Aloysius Lugira, the Traditional African religions are the only religions "that can claim to have originated in Africa. Other religions found in Africa have their origins in other parts of the world."

== Hinduism ==
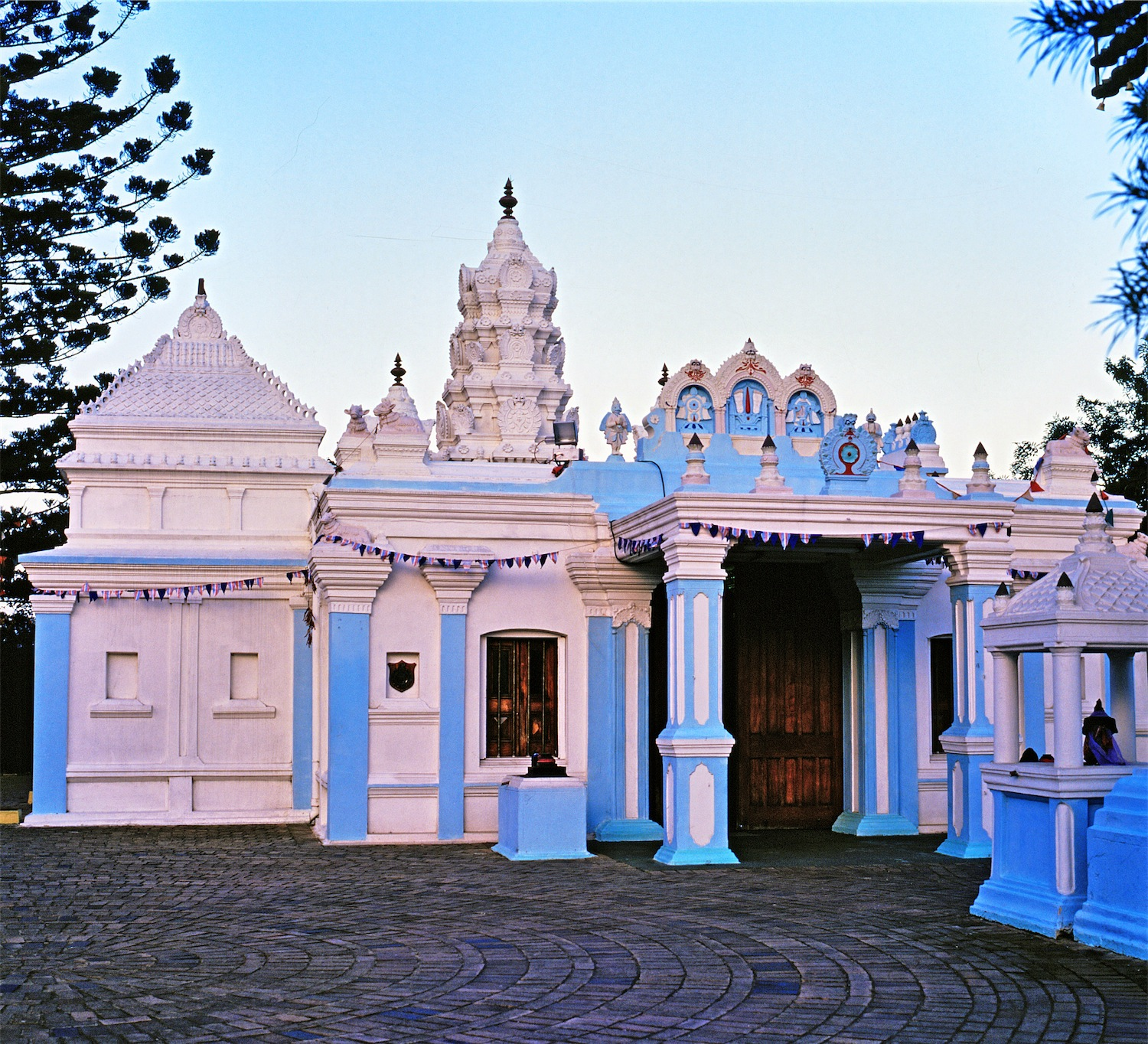
A Hindu Temple in Durban, South Africa.

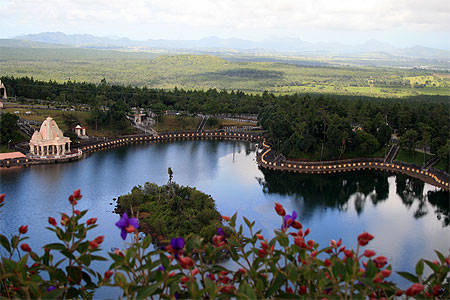
Ganga Talao in Mauritius

Hinduism has existed in Africa mainly since the late 19th century. There are an estimated 2–2.5 million adherents of Hinduism in Africa. It is the largest religion in Mauritius, and several other countries have Hindu temples. Hindus came to South Africa as indentured laborers in the 19th century. The young M.K. Gandhi lived and worked among the Indian community in South Africa for twenty years before returning to India to participate in India's freedom movement.

== Buddhism ==
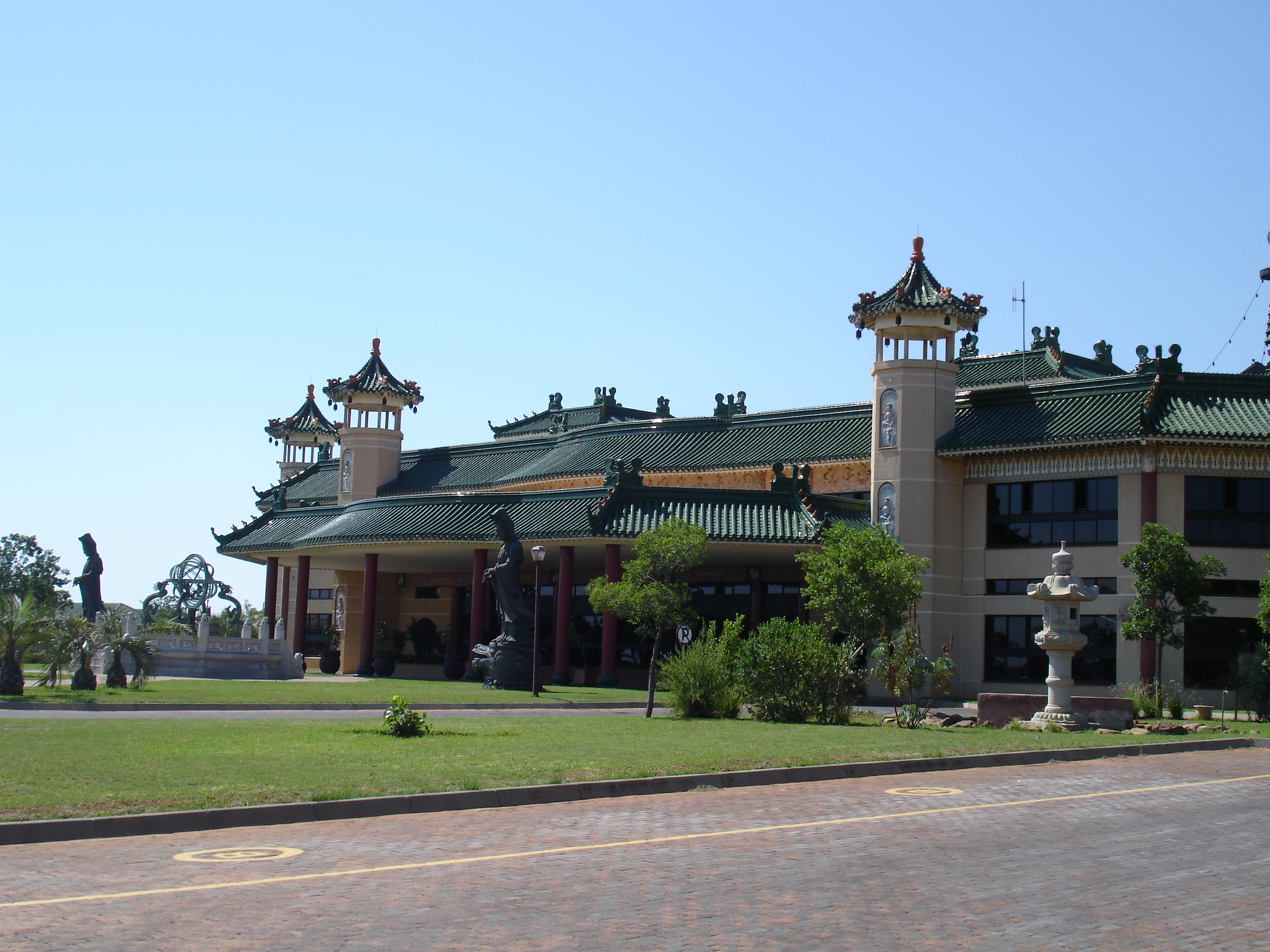
Nan Hua Temple in Bronkhorstspruit, South Africa.

Buddhism is a tiny religion in Africa with around 250,000 practicing adherents, and up to nearly 400,000 if combined with Taoism and Chinese Folk Religion as a common traditional religion of mostly new Chinese migrants (significant minority in Mauritius, Réunion, and South Africa). About half of African Buddhists are now living in South Africa, while Mauritius has the highest Buddhist percentage in the continent, between 1.5% to 2% of the total population.

== Other religions ==
Other faiths are practiced in Africa, including Sikhism, Jainism, Zoroastrianism and Rastafari among others.

== Irreligion ==
A Gallup poll found that the irreligious comprise 20% in South Africa, 16% in Botswana, 13% in Mozambique, 13% in Togo, 12% in Ivory Coast, 10% in Ethiopia and Angola, 9% in Sudan, Zimbabwe and Algeria, 8% in Namibia and 7% in Madagascar.

== Syncretism ==
Syncretism is the combining of different (often contradictory) beliefs, often while melding practices of various schools of thought. In the commonwealth of Africa syncretism with indigenous beliefs is practiced throughout the region. It is believed by some to explain religious tolerance between different groups. Kwesi Yankah and John Mbiti argue that many African peoples today have a 'mixed' religious heritage to try to reconcile traditional religions with Abrahamic faiths.

Jesse Mugambi claims that the Christianity taught to Africans by missionaries had a fear of syncretism, which was carried on by current African Christian leadership in an attempt to keep Christianity "pure." Syncretism in Africa is said by others to be overstated, and due to a misunderstanding of the abilities of local populations to form their own orthodoxies and also confusion over what is culture and what is religion. Others state that the term syncretism is a vague one, since it can be applied to refer to substitution or modification of the central elements of Christianity or Islam with beliefs or practices from somewhere else.

The consequences under this definition, according to missiologist Keith Ferdinando, are a fatal compromise of the religion's integrity. However, communities in Africa (e.g. Afro-Asiatic) have many common practices which are also found in Abrahamic faiths, and thus these traditions do not fall under the category of some definitions of syncretism.

== Religious distribution by country ==
=== Northern Africa ===
Country	Population	Christian		Muslim		Irreligion		Hindu		Buddhist		Folk religion		Other religion		Jewish	
Country	Population	Pop.	%	Pop.	%	Pop.	%	Pop.	%	Pop.	%	Pop.	%	Pop.	%	Pop.	%
Algeria	43,851,044	419,570	1.00	43,734,560	98.00	354,700	1.8	0	0.00	0	0.00	10,000	0.20	0	0.00	140,000	0.33
Egypt	81,120,000	9,486,120	11.20	76,982,880	88.90	0	0.00	0	0.00	0	0.00	0	0.00	0	0.00	1,000	0.10
Libya	6,360,000	171,720	2.70	6,143,760	96.60	12,720	0.20	0	0.00	19,080	0.30	0	0.00	0	0.00	0	0.00
Morocco	31,950,000	20,000	0.06	31,918,050	99.90	0	0.00	0	0.00	0	0.00	0	0.00	3,200	0.01	2,200	0.04
Sudan	33,600,000	1,814,400	5.40	30,475,200	90.70	336,000	1.00	0	0.00	0	0.00	940,800	2.80	0	0.00	0	0.00
Tunisia	10,480,000	20,960	0.20	10,427,600	99.50	20,960	0.20	0	0.00	0	0.00	0	0.00	0	0.00	1,100	0.10

=== Eastern Africa ===
Country	Population	Christian		Muslim		Irreligion		Hindu		Buddhist		Folk religion		Other religion		Jewish	
Country	Population	Pop.	%	Pop.	%	Pop.	%	Pop.	%	Pop.	%	Pop.	%	Pop.	%	Pop.	%
Burundi	13,162,955	12,294,199	93.40	276,422	2.10	0	0.00	0	0.00	0	0.00	477,960	5.70	0	0.00	0	0.00
Comoros	730,620	5,000	0.20	725,620	99.80	0	0.00	0	0.00	0	0.00	000	0.00	0	0.00	0	0.00
Djibouti	893,450	20,470	2.30	862,410	96.90	1,780	0.20	0	0.00	0	0.00	2,670	0.30	0	0.00	1,780	0.20
Eritrea	5,250,000	2,625,000	50.00	2,520,000	48.00	5,250	0.10	0	0.00	0	0.00	21,000	0.40	0	0.00	0	0.00
Ethiopia	126,527,060	85,152,711	67.3	39,602,969	31.3	50,000	0.06	0	0.00	0	0.00	2,156,700	2.60	0	0.00	25,000	1.00
Kenya	47,564,296	44,667,473	85.5	5,184,508	10.9	761,029	1.60	61,834	0.13	N/A	N/A	323,437	0.68	546,989	1.15	N/A	N/A
Madagascar	28,812,195	24,403,929	84.7	893,178	3.1	1,428,990	6.90	10,000	0.05	0	0.00	931,950	4.50	20,000	0.10	0	0.00
Malawi	17,563,749	13,581,623	77.33	2,426,754	13.82	376,784	2.15	3,211	0.02	5,506	0.03	186,284	1.06	983,587	5.60	N/A	N/A
Mauritius	1,235,260	328,900	25.30	217,100	16.70	7,800	0.60	733,200	56.40	0	0.00	9,100	0.70	3,900	0.30	0	0.00
Mayotte	200,000	1,400	0.70	197,200	98.60	400	0.20	0	0.00	0	0.00	1,000	0.50	0	0.00	0	0.00
Mozambique	34,173,805	21,187,759	62.00	6,493,022	19.00	4,186,810	17.90	0	0.00	0	0.00	1,730,860	7.40	0	0.00	0	0.00
(Réunion) Reunion	850,000	744,600	87.60	35,700	4.20	17,000	2.00	38,250	4.50	1,700	0.20	3,400	0.40	9,350	1.10	0	0.00
Rwanda	13,400,541	12,569,707	93.80	294,811	2.20	382,320	3.60	0	0.00	0	0.00	106,200	1.00	21,240	0.20	0	0.00
Seychelles	90,000	84,600	94.00	1,038	1.10	1,890	2.10	1,890	2.10	0	0.00	0	0.00	540	0.60	0	0.00
Somalia	9,330,000	100	0.01	9,311,340	99.80	0	0.00	0	0.00	0	0.00	0	0.00	0	0.00	0	0.00
South Sudan	12,118,379	7,331,619	60.50	751,339	6.20	49,750	0.50	0	0.00	0	0.00	3,273,550	32.90	0	0.00	0	0.00
Tanzania	61,741,120	38,958,647	63.10	21,053,722	34.10	627,760	1.40	44,840	0.10	0	0.00	807,120	1.80	30,000	0.07	0	0.00
Uganda	47,729,952	40,284,079	84.4	6,539,003	13.7	167,100	0.50	100,260	0.30	0	0.00	300,780	0.90	33,420	0.10	0	0.00
Zambia	20,216,029	19,730,844	97.60	202,160	1.00	65,450	0.50	13,090	0.10	0	0.00	39,270	0.30	117,810	0.90	0	0.00
Zimbabwe	16,775,307	14,678,393	87.50	167,753	1.00	993,030	7.90	0	0.00	0	0.00	477,660	3.80	37,710	0.30	10,000	0.08
Eastern Africa	333,970,000	238,006,180	71.27	73,510,760	22.01	9,371,310	2.81	982,040	0.29	1,700	0.00	11,288,190	3.38	760,090	0.23	11,780	0.00

=== Central Africa ===
Country	Population	Christian		Muslim		Irreligion		Hindu		Buddhist		Folk religion		Other religion		Jewish	
Country	Population	Pop.	%	Pop.	%	Pop.	%	Pop.	%	Pop.	%	Pop.	%	Pop.	%	Pop.	%
Angola	35,981,281	33,426,610	92.90	395,794	1.10	973,080	5.10	0	0.00	0	0.00	801,360	4.20	0	0.00	0	0.00
Cameroon	30,987,821	20,544,925	66.30	9,314,939	30.06	340,866	1.10	0	0.00	0	0.00	402,841	1.30	216,915	0.70	0	0.00
Central African Republic	4,403,540	3,938,000	89.50	862,000	15.00	44,000	1.00	0	0.00	0	0.00	44,000	1.00	0	0.00	0	0.00
Chad	11,230,000	4,559,380	40.60	9,200,000	58.00	280,750	2.50	0	0.00	0	0.00	157,220	1.40	11,230	0.10	0	0.00
(Democratic Republic of the Congo) DRC	111,859,928	104,161,811	95.80	2,125,338	1.90	1,187,460	1.80	30,000	0.05	0	0.00	461,790	0.70	65,970	0.10	2,500	0.00003
Republic of the Congo	4,040,000	3,470,360	85.90	108,000	2.00	363,600	9.00	0	0.00	0	0.00	113,120	2.80	44,440	1.10	0	0.00
Equatorial Guinea	700,000	620,900	88.70	80,000	10.00	35,000	5.00	0	0.00	0	0.00	11,900	1.70	3,500	0.50	0	0.00
Gabon	1,510,000	1,155,150	76.50	169,120	11.20	84,560	5.60	0	0.00	0	0.00	90,600	6.00	10,570	0.70	0	0.00
(São Tomé and Príncipe) São Tome and Príncipe	170,000	139,740	82.20	6,000	3.00	21,420	12.60	0	0.00	0	0.00	4,930	2.90	4,080	2.40	0	0.00

=== Southern Africa ===
Country	Population	Christian		Muslim		Irreligion		Hindu		Buddhist		Folk religion		Other religion		Jewish	
Country	Population	Pop.	%	Pop.	%	Pop.	%	Pop.	%	Pop.	%	Pop.	%	Pop.	%	Pop.	%
Botswana	2,010,000	1,449,210	72.10	8,040	0.40	414,060	20.60	6,030	0.30	0	0.00	120,600	6.00	12,060	0.60	0	0.00
Eswatini	1,193,560	1,051,526	88.10	2,400	2.00	120,190	10.10	1,190	0.10	0	0.00	11,900	1.00	4,760	0.40	0	0.00
Lesotho	2,170,000	2,105,560	96.70	3,000	0.10	67,270	3.10	0	0.00	0	0.00	2,170	0.10	0	0.00	0	0.00
Namibia	2,280,000	2,223,000	97.50	6,840	0.30	43,320	1.90	0	0.00	0	0.00	4,560	0.20	0	0.00	0	0.00
Saint Helena	4,000	3,860	96.50	140	3.50	0	0.00	0	0.00	0	0.00	0	0.00	0	0.00	0	0.00
South Africa	62,027,503	50,366,332	81.20	1,240,550	2.00	6,136,274	14.90	753,524	1.70	100,260	0.20	200,520	0.40	150,390	0.30	50,130	0.10

=== Western Africa ===
Country	Population	Christian		Muslim		Irreligion		Hindu		Buddhist		Folk religion		Other religion		Not Stated/Undeclared	
Country	Population	Pop.	%	Pop.	%	Pop.	%	Pop.	%	Pop.	%	Pop.	%	Pop.	%	Pop.	%
Benin	13,852,780	5,690,500	48.00	3,141,320	28.00	442,500	6.00	0	0.00	0	0.00	1,601,850	18.00	0	0.00	0	0.00
Burkina Faso	20,505,155	5,392,855	26.3	13,082,290	63.8							1,845,463	9.0	184,546	0.9	0	0.00
Cape Verde	512,450	445,500	89.10	800	2.00	45,500	9.10	0	0.00	0	0.00	7,500	1.50	1,000	0.20	0	0.00
(The Gambia) Gambia	1,730,000	77,850	4.50	1,645,230	95.10	0	0.00	0	0.00	0	0.00	1,730	0.10	0	0.00	0	0.00
Ghana	34,237,620	24,411,423	71.3	6,813,286	19.9	338,720	1.1					985,365	3.2	1,385,665	4.5		
Guinea	9,980,000	1,087,820	10.90	8,423,120	84.40	179,640	1.80	0	0.00	0	0.00	269,460	2.70	0	0.00	0	0.00
(Guinea-Bissau) Guinea Bissau	1,520,000	300,000	20.00	826,800	45.20	65,360	4.00	0	0.00	0	0.00	469,680	28.00	0	0.00	0	0.00
Ivory Coast	29,389,150	11,696,880	39.8	12,490,390	42.5	3,703,033	12.6					646,450	2.2	205,725	0.7	646,560	2.2
Liberia	3,990,000	3,427,410	85.90	962,000	20.00	55,860	1.40	0	0.00	0	0.00	19,950	0.50	3,990	0.10	0	0.00
Mali	19,329,841	491,840	3.20	17,508,400	95.00	414,990	0.60	0	0.00	0	0.00	245,920	1.20	0	0.00	0	0.00
Mauritania	4,594,525	3,000	0.10	4,591,525	99.90	0	0	0	0.00	0	0.00	0	0	0	0.00	0	0.00
Niger	15,510,000	124,080	0.80	15,261,840	98.40	108,570	0.70	0	0.00	0	0.00	0	0.00	0	0.00	0	0.00
Nigeria	230,842,743	113,805,472	49.3	112,651,258	48.8	633,680	0.04	0	0.00	10,000	0.01	2,217,880	1.00	90,000	0.06	0	0.00
Senegal	17,745,000	887,250	5.00	16,325,400	92.00	35,490	0.20	0	0.00	0	0.00	496,860	2.80	0	0.00	0	0.00
Sierra Leone	5,870,000	1,226,830	21.00	4,578,600	78.00	5,870	0.10	0	0.00	0	0.00	46,960	1.00	0	0.00	0	0.00
Togo	6,030,000	2,635,110	43.70	1,562,000	20.00	373,860	6.20	0	0.00	0	0.00	2,146,680	35.60	36,180	0.60	0	0.00

== See also ==
- Major religious groups
- Religion in Asia
- Religion in Europe
- Religion in Oceania
- Religion in North America
- Religion in South America
- List of Ethnic groups of Africa
