= Mohammed Hegazy =

Egyptian Muslim convert to Christianity (born 1982)

- Born: Egypt
- Citizenship: Egyptian
- Known for: Converting to Christianity
- Conviction: Apostasy
- Criminal charges: Apostasy

Mohammed Hegazy (Arabic: محمد حجازي, IPA: [mæˈħæmmæd ħeˈɡæːzi]; born 1982) is the first Egyptian Muslim convert to Christianity to seek official recognition of his conversion from the Egyptian government.

== Conversion and legal case ==
Hegazy grew up in Port Said on the Suez Canal in Egypt.

=== Conversion ===
He converted to Coptic Orthodox Christianity from Islam in 1998 and took the name Beshoy (Coptic: Ⲡⲓϣⲱⲓ) after a Coptic monk and saint.

His wife, Um Hashim Kamel, also converted several years ago, taking the name Christine (Coptic: ⲭⲣⲩⲥⲧⲓⲛⲁ). They both have a daughter, Miriam who was born while in hiding. He reports that he converted after starting "readings and comparative studies in religions" finding that he was "not consistent with Islamic teachings." He claimed that "the major issue for me was love. Islam wasn't promoting love as Christianity did."

Although Christianity is legal in Egypt, apostasy from Islam, or leaving it, is punishable by death under a widespread interpretation of Islamic law, but the state has never ordered or carried out an execution. Theoretically, Egyptian law must be derived from Islamic law, according to a ruling several decades ago. Converts are often harassed by police, who use laws against "insulting religion" or "disturbing public order" to justify legal action against them. Hegazy reports that after his conversion was discovered, he was detained for three days and tortured by police. In 2001, he published a book of poems critical of security services and was held for three months for sedition, disturbing public order, and insulting the president and was eventually released without charge.

=== Suit to change religious status ===
In 2007, Hegazy sued the Egyptian court to change his religion from "Islam" to "Christianity" on his national identification card. He said he wants to do this so that his child can be openly raised as a Christian, get a Christian birth certificate and marry in a church. He also stated that he wants to set a precedent for other converts.

His first lawyer, Mamdouh Nakhlah filed the case, but then quit after Hegazy's conversion caused a major uproar. Nakhlah told the Associated Press that he initially accepted the case because of an editorial last month by one of Egypt's highest Islamic clerics, the Grand Mufti Ali Gomaa, who wrote against the killing of apostates, saying there is no worldly retribution for Muslims who abandon their religion.

=== Reaction of Muslim conservatives ===
Gomaa's comments were sharply criticized by Muslim conservatives, who felt that he was opening the door for Muslims to leave their faith. Sheikh Gad al-Ibrahim told Al-Quds al-Arabi that "the Egyptian government should find Mohammed Hegazy and apply shari'a, giving him three days to reconvert and then killing him if he refuses". Sheikh Youssef al-Badri and Souad Saleh, a professor at Egypt's al-Azhar university where Egypt's top Islamic scholars work, agreed with Al-Ibrahim, openly challenging statements by Egypt's second highest religious authority last month that apostasy from Islam should not be punished in this world. Gomaa later clarified his controversial statement by saying that only apostates who "actively engaged in the subversion of society" should be punished.

However, shari'a is enshrined as the basis of Egypt's legal code in Article 2 of the constitution, and many Muslims see no distinction between apostasy and subversion. A second lawyer, Ramsis Raouf Al-Naggar, announced he would take up the case but then refused. Al-Naggar has stated that he is pessimistic that the suit could be won because of all the conflict surrounding it. He said that Hegazy had not given them the necessary church documents that could be used in court as evidence of his conversion to Christianity. Hegazy recently told reporters that he had found a new solicitor but declined to reveal the name for security reasons.

Hegazy raised a storm of controversy when pictures of him posing for journalists with a poster of the Virgin Mary were published in the newspapers.

Fatwas were issued by Muslim clerics calling for Hegazy's death. Under at least one fatwa, Hegazy's daughter Miriam will be killed at the age of 10 if she does not choose Islam. Hegazy and his wife have decided to remain in Egypt and go ahead with the case, in spite of the various fatwas issued against him and his family.

He has received death threats by telephone. He and his wife have been ostracized by their families and are currently in hiding. Christine's family has sworn to kill her because she married a non-Muslim against the family's wishes.

Hegazy's family was also angry with him. In a 2008 interview to a local Egyptian newspaper, Hegazy's father said, "I am going to try to talk to my son and convince him to return to Islam. If he refuses, I am going to kill him with my own hands."

Shortly after, Hegazy released this statement in response to his father:

I would like to send a message to my dad. I saw what you said in the newspapers. You say you want to kill me; to shed my blood in public. But I love you so much because you are my dad and because Jesus taught me to love. I accepted Jesus Christ willingly and nobody forced me. I forgive you. No matter what decision you make. No matter what you do. To my dad and mom, I say Jesus Christ died to save me.

=== Arrest of human rights workers ===
On August 8, 2007, Egyptian police detained two Christian human rights workers, Adel Fawzy Faltas and Peter Ezzat, after their organisation was involved in several controversial human rights cases, including Hegazy's. They were subsequently held without charge and had their detention renewed on August 21. The two activists are members of the Middle East Christian Association (MICA). A Canadian non-governmental organisation applying for legal recognition with the Egyptian government in June 2007, MICA was involved in several controversial human rights cases.

According to their lawyer, Peter Ramses Al-Nagar, the main reason for Faltas and Ezzat's detention was their work with Hegazy. He reported that the media have been saying that Faltas and Ezzat were arrested because they are the main reason that Hegazy became a Christian. Faltas had conducted a high-profile Internet interview with Mohammed Hegazy only days before his arrest, sparking claims in Egyptian media that he had led the Muslim to Christianity.

During a telephone interview with an Egyptian talk show, Fawzy said that Islamic scholars had accused his organisation of converting Hegazy to Christianity. "The first question they asked was whether we converted Mr. Hegazy", Mr. Fawzy told reporters. "I told them, "We don't convert anyone, we are a human rights organisation. But even if we had, there is no law against that."

=== 2008 rulings ===
In February, 2008, an Egyptian judge, Muhammad Husseini of a court in Cairo ruled that a Muslim who converted to Christianity cannot legally change his religious status, although he may believe what he wants in his heart. Judge Muhammad Husseini said that according to shari'a, Islam is the final and most complete religion and therefore Muslims already practice full freedom of religion and cannot convert to an older belief (Christianity or Judaism). Husseini also told the administrative court that Hegazy "can believe whatever he wants in his heart, but on paper he can't convert."

Judge Husseini based his decision on Article 2 of the Egyptian constitution, which makes shari'a the source of Egyptian law. Hegazy has denounced the ruling as a violation of his basic rights. "What does the state have to do with the religion I embrace?" Hegazy questioned, according to the United States Copts Association following the ruling.

The convert's defense team was also disappointed with the verdict: "The judge didn't listen to our defense, and we didn't even have a chance to talk before the court," said Gamel Eid, head of the Arab Network for Human Rights Information (ANHRI) to the Copts Association. An ANHRI representative said that Hegazy still plans to appeal the ruling or possibly open a new case. Katarina also plans to file a petition for her right to change her religion to Christianity.

In Egypt, a child's registered religion is based on the father's official faith. Therefore, since Hegazy is officially Muslim, his daughter would not be able to enroll in Christian religious classes at school, wed in a church, or attend church services openly without harassment under Egyptian law.

However, in a different case in the same month, an Egyptian court ruled that twelve Coptic Christians who converted to Islam and then reverted to Christianity could have their faith officially recognised. This decision was reached on the grounds that the Copts should not be considered apostates for converting from Islam because they had been born Christian. The decision overturned a lower court ruling that said the state need not recognise conversions from Islam because of a religious ban.

A lawyer for the twelve Coptic Christians described the case as a victory for human rights and freedom of religion. He said that it could open the door for hundreds of other Copts who want to revert to their original faith from Islam.

Reversion to Islam

On July 30, 2016, while he was in police custody, Hegazy announced that he left Christianity and returned to Islam. Then after release from prison he declared he is still a Christian and that he was forced under torture to claim that he converted to Islam.

== See also ==
- Human rights in Egypt
- Egyptian identification card controversy
- Lina Joy
- Islamization of Egypt
