= Kampala Baháʼí Temple =

Baháʼí temple in Uganda

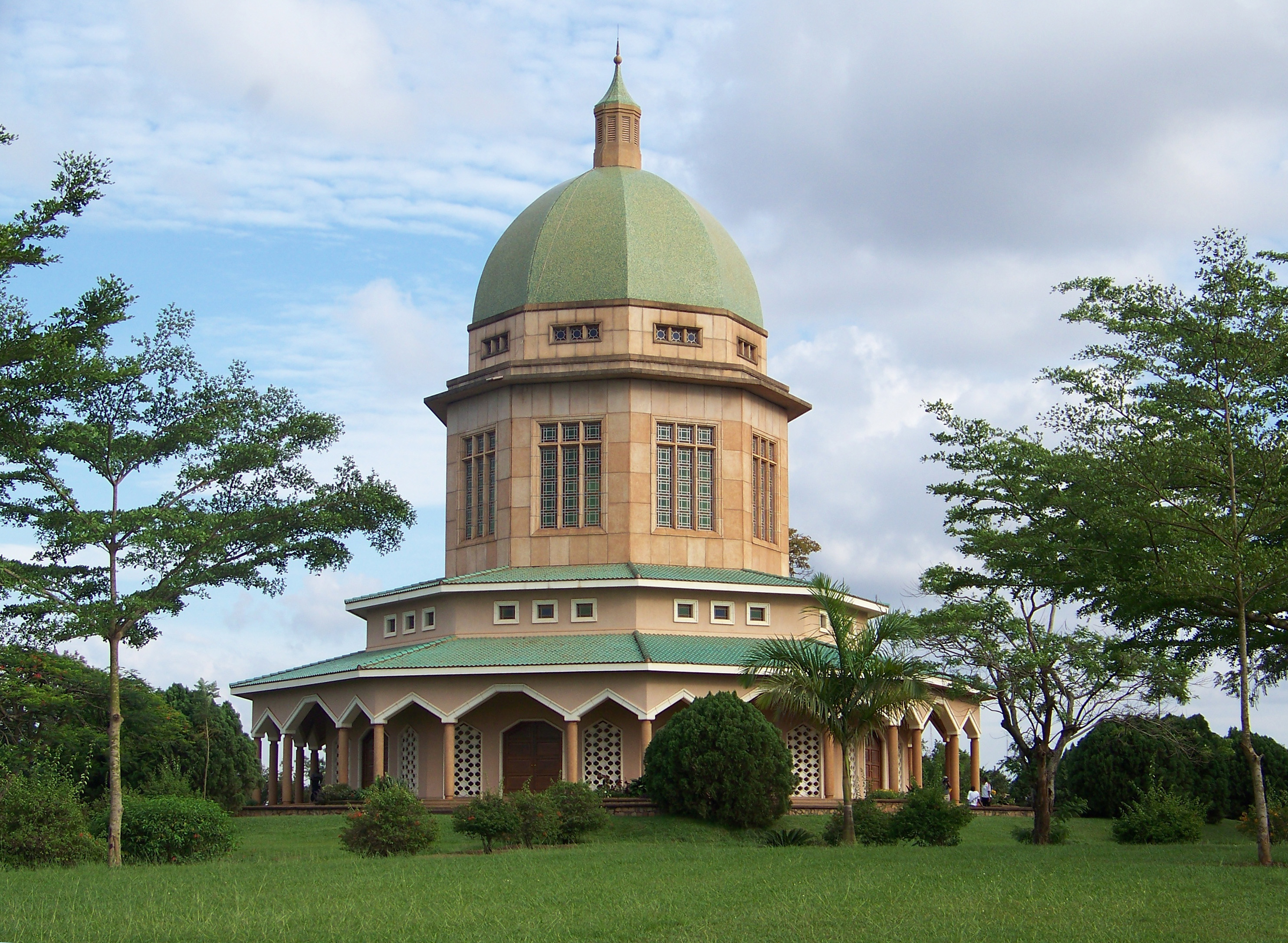
- Interactive map of the Kampala Baháʼí Temple area

General information
- Type: Baháʼí House of Worship
- Location: Kampala, Uganda
- Coordinates: 0°21′52″N 32°35′19″E

Height
- Height: Over 39 metres (128 ft)

Dimensions
- Diameter: Over 100 metres (330 ft)

Design and construction
- Architect: Charles Mason Remey

Other information
- Seating capacity: 800

Website
- Official page

The Kampala Baháʼí Temple is a Baháʼí House of Worship, known to Baháʼís as the "mother Temple of Africa" and located on the outskirts of Kampala, Uganda. It was dedicated in 1961, making it the world's third Baháʼí House of Worship to be completed, and at that time it was the tallest building in East Africa.

== History ==
The Kampala Baháʼí House of Worship was the world's third Baháʼí House of Worship to be completed. The original intention of Shoghi Effendi – head of the Baháʼí Faith from 1922 to 1957 – had been that the third House of Worship would be built in Tehran, which he announced as one of the goals of the Ten Year Global Plan (1953–63). However, an outbreak of persecution of Baháʼís in Iran in 1955 made this plan impossible, so he announced that two other Houses of Worship would be built, in Kampala, Uganda, and Sydney, Australia. The announcement of the Kampala temple was made on 23 August 1955. The importance of Kampala for Shoghi Effendi was based on a few factors: he favored its location at "the heart of the African continent", it was among the first destinations to which Baháʼís had relocated during the Two Year African Campaign (1951–53), and it was the first place in Africa to experience large numbers of people converting to the Baháʼí Faith. Shoghi Effendi gave the House of Worship the title of the "mother Temple of Africa".

The site chosen for the Kampala House of Worship was Kikaaya Hill, around 7 km from the present-day city centre. Following an initial design which had been rejected, a new design was prepared in Haifa by the Charles Mason Remey, under the direction of Shoghi Effendi, which received approval in August 1956. The foundation stone was laid on January 26, 1957 by Rúhíyyih Khánum, representing Shoghi Effendi. Musa Banani, the first Hand of the Cause in Africa, was also present for the groundbreaking and placed a gift of soil from the Shrine of Baháʼu'lláh, sent by Shoghi Effendi, in the foundation. The dedication ceremony was held in January 1961 and was also attended by Rúhíyyih Khánum. Construction cost about $120,000 in total.

== Architecture ==
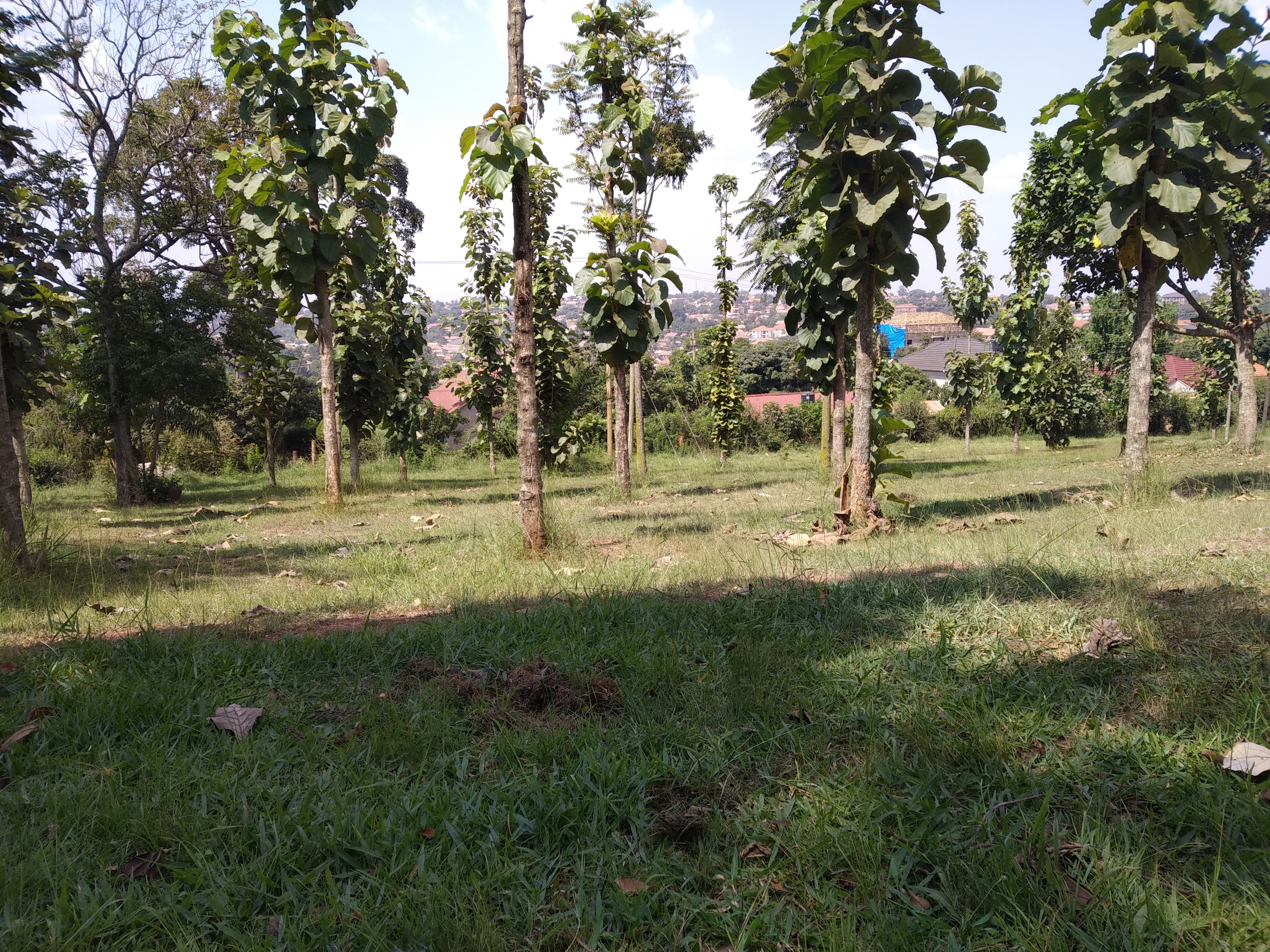
Grounds of the House of Worship

The building is more than 39 metres high, and over 100 metres in diameter at the base. The dome is over 37 metres high and 13 metres in diameter. As a protection against earthquakes that can occur in the region, the temple has a foundation that goes 3 metres beneath the ground. The temple has seating for 800 people. At the time it was built, the Kampala Baháʼí temple was the tallest building in East Africa.

The temple's dome is built out of fixed mosaic tiles from Italy, whereas the tiles of the lower roof are from Belgium. The wall panels contain windows of green, pale blue, and amber colored glass of German origin. Both the timber used for making the doors and benches and the stone used for the walls of the temple are from within Uganda itself.

The temple property includes the House of Worship, extensive gardens, a guest house, and an administrative centre. The property covers more than 52 acres of land.

== Reception ==
Gerald Rulekere of UGPulse visited the temple in 2006 and offered effusive praise. He wrote that it has been "hailed as one of the wonders of not only Uganda, but of Africa as a whole". Furthermore, he assessed that the temple "exudes a regal magnificent presence" and that the "inside ... is even grander than the outside", and stated that it has "awed and amazed many visitors not only because of its architectural splendor, but also because of the beautiful natural environment in which it majestically stands".

Journalists from The Observer, a Ugandan publication, visited the temple in 2024 and described it as a "beautiful landmark", writing that "its beauty blew us away".

== Gallery ==
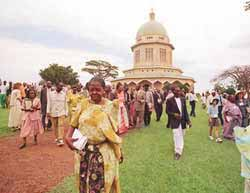

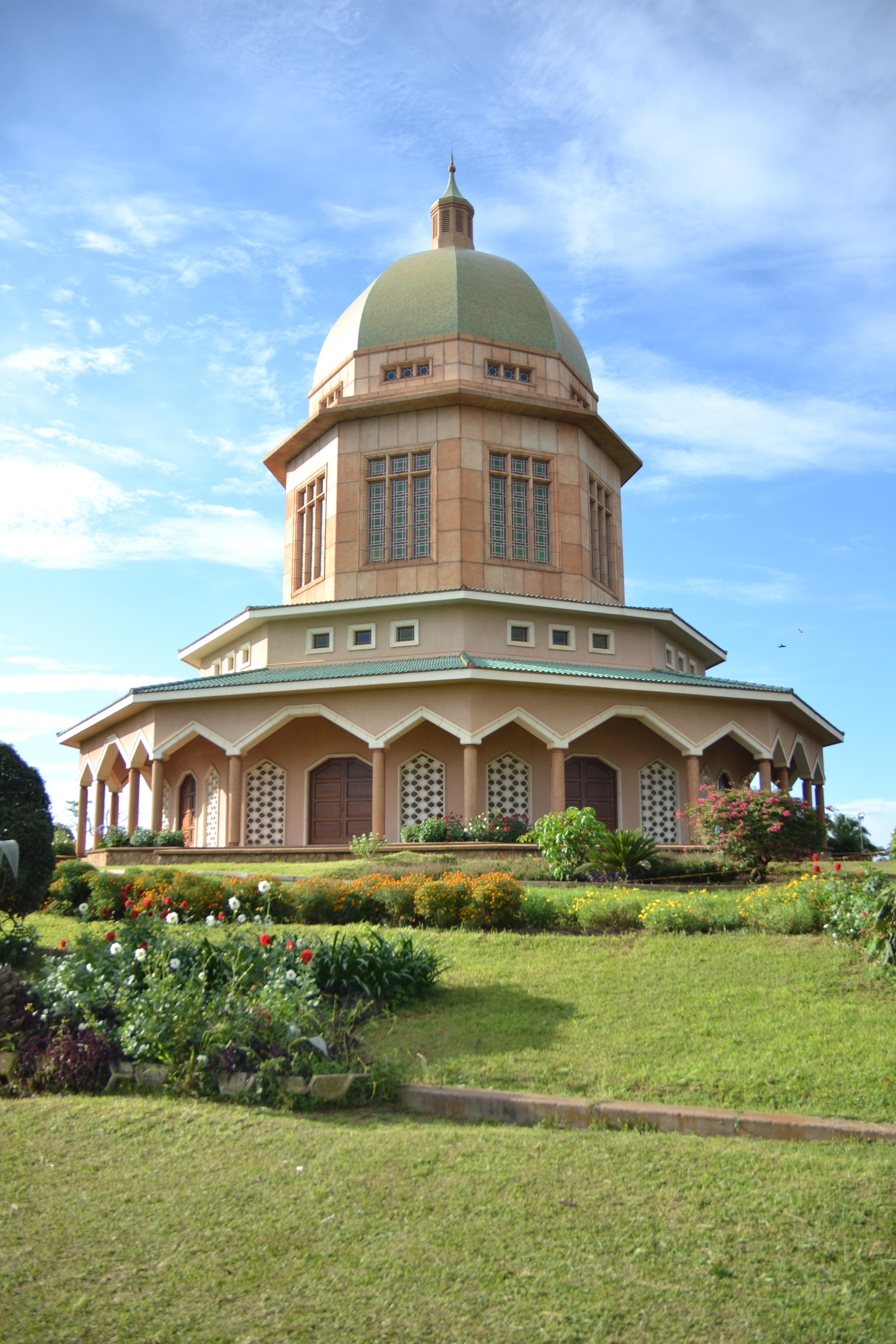

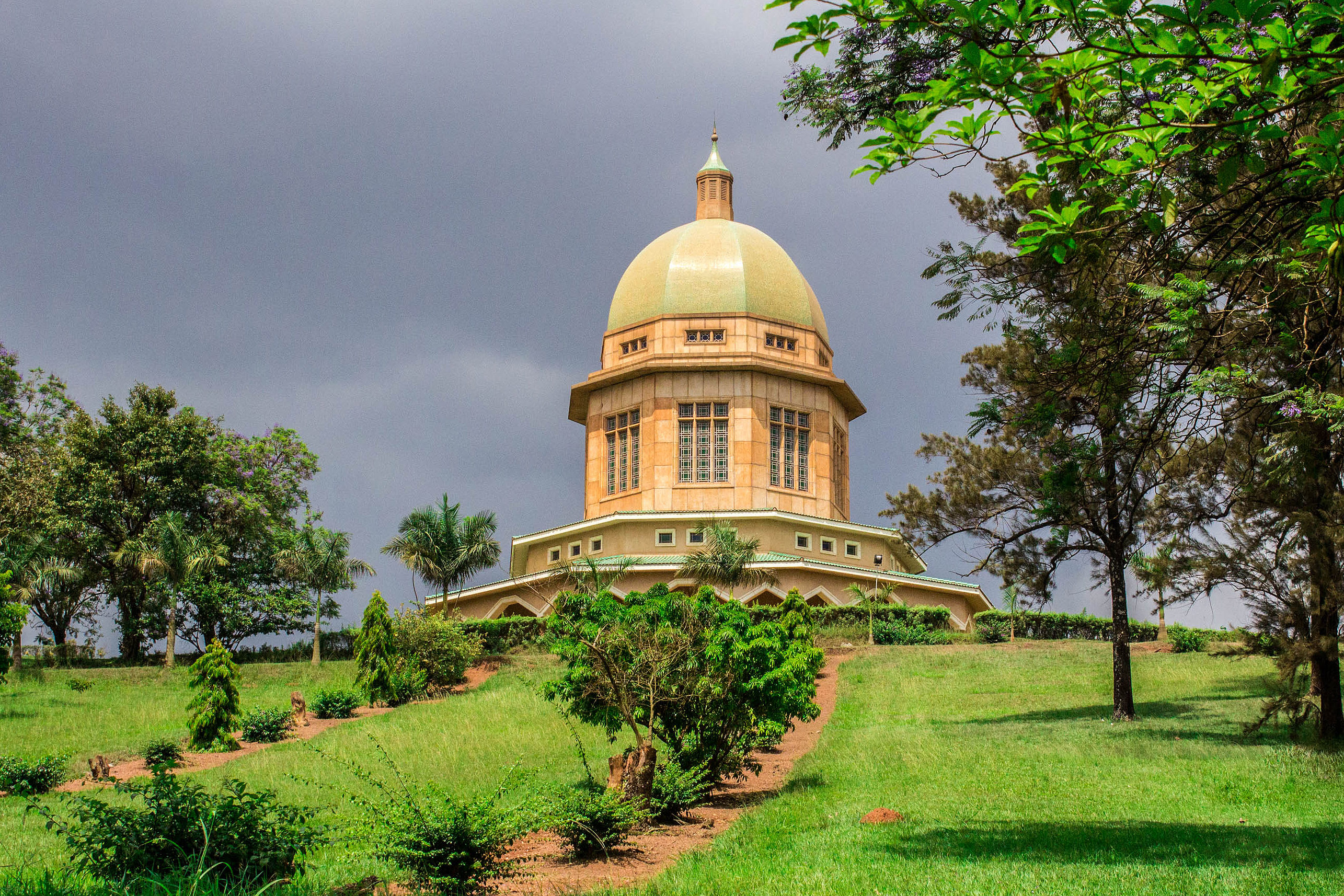

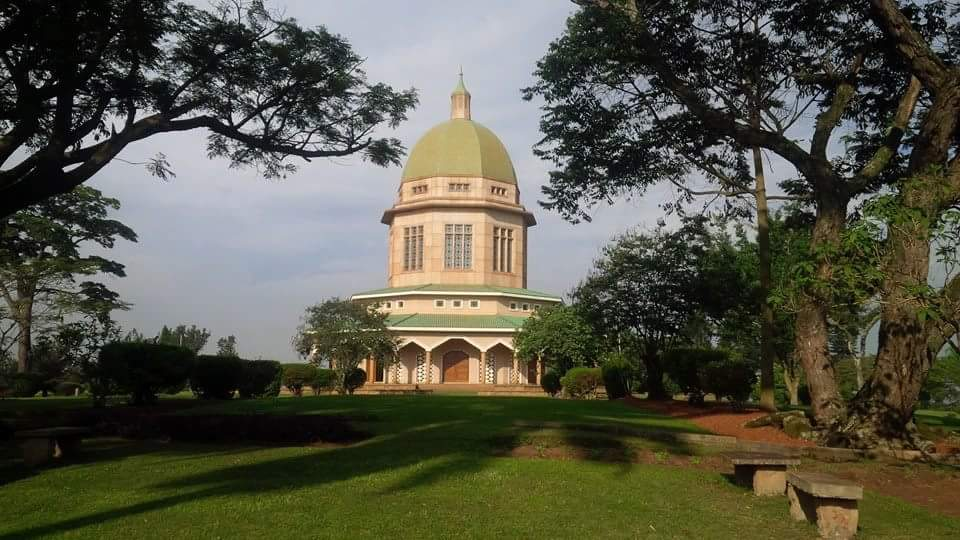

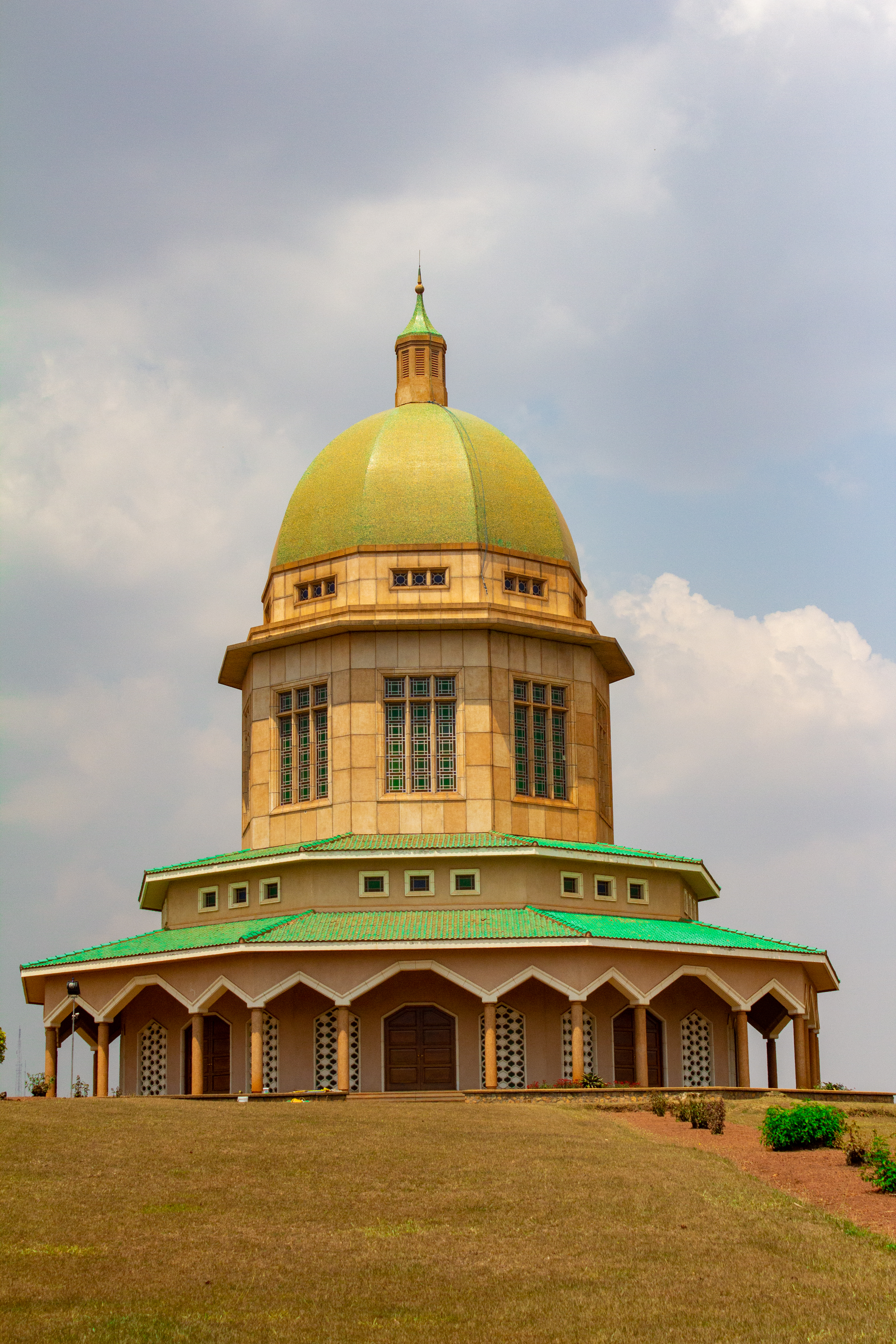

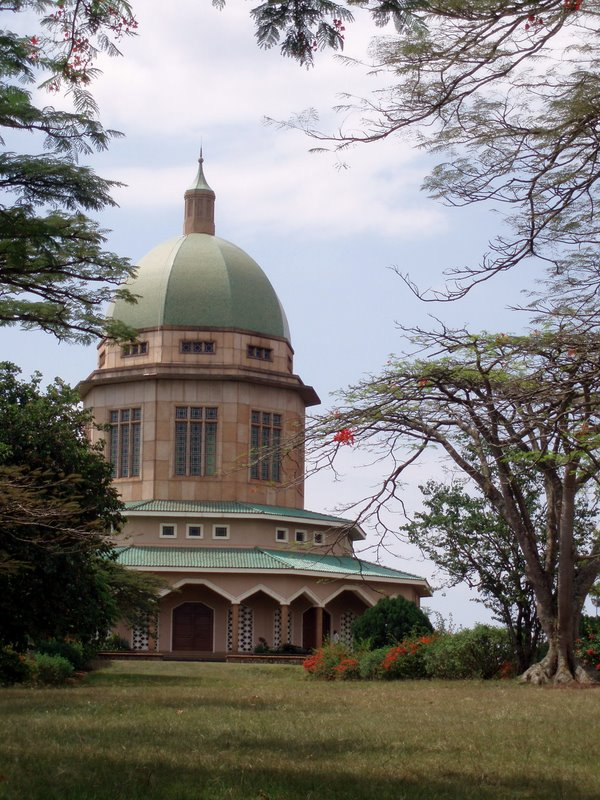

== See also ==
- Baháʼí Faith in Uganda
- Baháʼí Faith in Africa
- Religion in Uganda
- Architecture of Africa
