= Egyptian identification card controversy =

Egyptian ID card dispute

The Egyptian identification card controversy is a series of events, beginning in the 1990s, that created a de facto state of disenfranchisement for Egyptian Baháʼís, atheists, agnostics, and other Egyptians who did not identify themselves as Muslim, Christian, or Jewish on government identity documents.

During the period of disenfranchisement, the people affected, who were mostly Baháʼís, were unable to obtain the necessary government documents to have rights in their country unless they lied about their religion, which conflicted with Baháʼí religious principle. Those affected could not obtain identification cards, birth certificates, death certificates, marriage or divorce certificates, or passports. Without those documents, they could not be employed, educated, treated in hospitals, or vote, among other things.

As of August 2009, the situation is apparently resolved, following a protracted legal process. Identification documents may now list a dash in place of one of the three recognized religions. Under this compromise solution, the Baháʼí Faith and other beliefs are still unrecognized by the government — Islam, Christianity, and Judaism remain the only recognized religions. The first identification cards were issued to two Baháʼís under the new policy on August 8, 2009.

== Historical background ==
Similarly to Iran and several other Muslim-majority countries, the Egyptian government requires that its citizens list their religion on government identity documents. Egyptian law recognizes Christianity and Judaism, and provides for some measure of tolerance for these minority groups. Of those who do not identify themselves with one of the three government-recognized religions of Egypt, the largest group of Egyptians with unrecognized beliefs is believed to be the Baháʼís. Although reliable statistics are not available, the number of Baháʼís in Egypt has been estimated at about 2,000 as of 2006. Baháʼí institutions and community activities have been illegal under Egyptian law since 1960 by Law 263 at the decree of then-President Gamal Abdel Nasser. Egyptian Baháʼís have suffered from continual persecution, including the government confiscation of Baháʼí centres, libraries, and cemeteries, and have been charged with apostasy. Although few Egyptians publicly identify as atheists or agnostics, they faced similar difficulties.

== National identification cards ==
All Egyptian citizens from the age of 15 must carry national identification cards, which must be presented for any type of government service, such as medical care in a public hospital or processing for a property title or deed as well as to obtain employment, education, banking services, and many other important private transactions. ID cards are also required to pass through police checkpoints, and individuals without such cards are accordingly deprived of freedom of movement. The national identification cards contained a field for religion, with only Islam, Christianity and Judaism acceptable as a religion.

== Changing religion ==
Changing religion on one's card is extremely difficult, especially for those who are converting from Islam. The Catholic charity Aid to the Church in Need, claims that conversion to Christianity remains prohibited in practice even though Article 46 of the Constitution says that the state guarantees freedom of belief and religion. Therefore, according to the Vital Statistics Office, a Muslim who is baptised a Christian is still a Muslim. This means that a former Muslim cannot change his or her identity papers to show a new religion or name. The charity claims that the lack of a law on conversion from Islam to another religion leaves the matter in the hands of judges who must choose between Sharia and the principle of equality of all citizens before the law.

In 2008 Christian convert Mohammed Higazi was not allowed to have his identity changed to register his change of religion from Islam to Christianity. During a trial to have his religion changed on his identity papers, the opposing lawyer made death threats against Mr Higazi for converting to Christianity. The judge made no objection to these statements and expressed his loathing of the accused because of his conversion. The judge stated that he would never let Higazi be registered as a Christian. He defended his decision by saying that Islam is the principal religion in Egypt.

== Effect of computerized identification cards ==
Major hardship began in the 1990s when the government modernized the electronic processing of national identification cards. Prior to this, Baháʼís were sometimes able to obtain identification documents from a sympathetic clerk willing to issue a card that left the religious-affiliation slot blank, listed religion as "other" or a dash, or listed "Baháʼí." Baháʼís have long refused to falsely list themselves as Muslim, Christian, or Jewish as a matter of religious principle.

Electronic processing locked out the possibility of an unlisted religion, or any religious affiliation other than Muslim, Christian, or Jewish. Consequently, adherents of any other faith (or no faith) became unable to obtain any government identification documents (such as national identification cards, birth certificates, death certificates, marriage or divorce certificates, or passports) necessary to exercise their rights in their country unless they lied about their religion.

Without documents, Baháʼís could not be employed, educated, treated in hospitals, withdraw their own money from a bank, purchase food from state stores, or vote, among other hardships. Baháʼís became virtual non-citizens, without access to employment, education, and all government services, including hospital care. A number of Baháʼí young people are without valid ID cards, a situation that has forced them out of universities and the army, placing them on the margins of society.

== Timeline ==
In the 1990s, the Egyptian government announced it would be upgrading its identification card system by issuing computerized cards that would be less susceptible to forgery. This, the government indicated, would help to combat militant Islamic unrest, and improve data collection and access. The government indicated the shift to the new system would be gradual, but set January 2005 as the deadline for everyone to have the new cards – a deadline which was apparently extended to 2006.

The system had apparently undergone modifications since it was set up. In 2003, for example, four Baháʼís sought and obtained new computerized cards in which the religious affiliation field listed "other" – a designation to which the Baháʼí community does not object. More recently, however, the software had been updated so that only one of the three recognized religions can be entered. If the field is left blank, the computer refuses to issue the card.

The Baháʼí community of Egypt had approached the government on numerous occasions to plead for a simple change in the programming, if not the law, so that they could be issued valid ID cards under the new system. Such pleas, however, had been met with rejection and refusal.

Accordingly, all members of the Egyptian Baháʼí community faced the prospect of being left wholly without proper ID cards by 2006 – a situation in which they would essentially be denied all rights of citizenship, and, indeed, would be faced with the inability even to withdraw their own money from the bank, get medical treatment at public hospitals, or purchase food from state stores.

As the new cards were being issued, the government had asked young people to start coming in for the new cards, and a number of Baháʼí youth had accordingly been stripped of paper identification cards. Once stripped of ID cards, the Baháʼí youth essentially become prisoners in their own homes, since the authorities often set up evening checkpoints to verify the identity of young men. Individuals without proper ID face detention. Likewise, young people without ID cards are denied entrance and continuing enrollment in colleges and universities, as well as service in the armed forces.

== Court case ==
On April 4, 2006, a three-judge panel of the Egyptian Administrative Court upheld the right of a Baháʼí couple to lawfully state their religion on their ID cards. The cards had been confiscated by the government after the couple sought to have their passports updated to include their daughters. The couple, Husam Izzat Musa and Ranya Enayat Rushdy, sued, stating that the confiscation of the cards was illegal under Egypt's Constitution and international law. The court ruled for the couple, citing existing precedents and Islamic jurisprudence that allow for the right of non-Muslims to live in Muslim lands "without any of them being forced to change what they believe in" and ordered the civil registry to issue new documents that properly identify them as Baháʼís.

The court wrote:

It is not inconsistent with Islamic tenets to mention the religion on this card even though it may be a religion whose rites are not recognized for open practice, such as Baháʼísm [sic] and the like... On the contrary, these [religions] must be indicated so that the status of its bearer is known and thus he does not enjoy a legal status to which his belief does not entitle him in a Muslim society.

In the aftermath of the court ruling, various news media in Egypt and the Arab world reported on the ruling. Human rights groups in Egypt were supportive of the decision, while representatives of Al-Azhar University and the government were negative. Newspapers in Bahrain, Kuwait and elsewhere in the region also wrote about the case, with many going into long explanations about the Baháʼí Faith. Some statements by other organizations after the initial ruling include:

- IRIN, a news service of the United Nations serving the region, wrote, "Human rights activists have welcomed a landmark ruling by the Administrative Court recognizing the right of Egyptian Bahais to have their religion acknowledged on official documents."
- Al Arabiya, an online service of the television network, carried the headline, "They were forcing them to register themselves as Muslims; An Egyptian court recognizes the Baháʼí religion despite refusal by the Azhar."
- Al-Watan (Homeland), a newspaper of Kuwait, carried the headline: "They described it as the Greatest Setback; Al-Azhar scholars demand that the Egyptian judiciary review the ruling of acknowledging 'Al-Baháʼíyyah' [the Baháʼí Faith] as a religion." The lead of the article says: "A number of Al-Azhar scholars condemned the ruling of the Egyptian judiciary that acknowledged the Baháʼí creed, stressing that it is considered a great legal setback and a tragedy that must be drawn back, emphasizing that Baháʼís are not Muslims, rather, they are agents of Zionism and colonialism and are enemies of the country; they demanded a review of the ruling that acknowledges this creed."
- Al-Ahram, one of Egypt's leading daily newspapers, carried the headline: "Crisis in Parliament Over a Judicial Ruling About the Baháʼís; The Deputies: 'Al-Baháʼíyyah' [the Baháʼí Faith] is not a Divine religion … and the ruling contradicts the constitution." The article also stated that the government had decided to appeal the ruling.

On April 28, 2006, after reading that the Egyptian government asked for information on the Baháʼí Faith from members of Al-Azhar University, and knowing that much misinformation about the Baháʼí Faith has been published in the Egyptian media, the Baháʼí International Community's United Nations Office wrote to leaders of the Al Azhar Islamic Research Council to explain the essential principles of Baháʼí belief. The letter, which contained a brief statement of basic Baháʼí principles and doctrine, also asked that facts about the Baháʼí religion be obtained from trustworthy sources that were "uninfluenced by the misconceptions" that are being spread about the Baháʼí Faith.

The Egyptian government formally appealed the Administrative Court's ruling on May 7, 2006. The appeal came after attacks on the ruling in the Egyptian parliament and by representatives of Al-Azhar Islamic Centre. According to the IRIN news service, an Interior Ministry official, speaking on the condition of anonymity, said: "We presented an appeal to revoke the previous ruling on the basis that neither the Egyptian constitution nor Islamic law recognize Bahaism [sic] as a religion unto itself." Then on May 13, 2006, Kifayah, a loosely organized group of civil society organizations, journalists, writers, artists and academics, issued a collective statement calling for an end to discrimination against Baháʼís. The group which is composed of the Popular Group for Change, the Egyptian Democratic Centre, the Centre for Socialist Studies, Socialist Horizons, the Arabic network for Human Rights Information, and Civil Watch for Human Rights, along with some 40 journalists, writers, artists and academics wrote:

We confirm that this is not a case of the followers of the Baháʼí denomination only; it is the case of all minorities and faiths that are suffering from discrimination in Egyptian society for decades... Our attitude springs from a deep belief that calls for constitutional and political reform cannot be separated from demands for the guarantee of freedom of belief and expression equally for every citizen, regardless of religion, ethnicity, gender or color, otherwise, reform would become merely ink on paper and lose all meaning ... Today, the followers of a small denomination are sacrificed to fanaticism, but whose turn will it be tomorrow….if we be silent now?

Egypt's Supreme Administrative Court on 15 May suspended the implementation of the earlier lower Administrative Court ruling that allowed Baháʼís to have their religion recognized on official documents. The court agreed to hear the appeal starting on June 16, which continued to September 16. During this time, the state-sponsored National Council for Human Rights held a major symposium on the issues surrounding religious affiliation and identity cards, at which the Baháʼí community offered some testimony. The hearing was, however, postponed by the Supreme Administrative Court on September 21, 2006 until November 20, to await the completion of an advisory report by the State Commissioner's Authority.

During the court's wait, the Egyptian newspaper Rose al-Youssef published a story on October 14, 2006, stating that the advisory report was completed, and that the State Commissioner's Authority is urging the rejection of the lower court's ruling. Then on December 2 a final hearing was held; the court indicated that its judgement would be issued in the case on December 16. The Supreme Administrative Court issued its final judgement in the case of Husam Izzat Musa and Ranya Enayat Rushdy on December 16, upholding the government's policy of allowing only three religious affiliations on state ID cards and government documents.

After the ruling, various Egyptian human rights organizations, such as the Cairo Centre for Human Rights Studies, issued statements of support for the Baháʼí community of Egypt in their struggle for basic civil rights. The Universal House of Justice, the highest governing body of the Baha'i Faith on December 21 addressed a message to the Baha'is of Egypt in the wake of the Supreme Administrative Court's decision stating that they should continue in striving to continue to uphold the principle of the oneness of humankind and other Baháʼí principles.

On January 29, 2008 Cairo's court of Administrative Justice, ruling on two related court cases, and after six postponements, ruled in favour of the Baháʼís, allowing them to obtain birth certificates and identification documents, so long as they omit their religion on court documents; the government may, however, still appeal against the judgement. The director of the Egyptian Initiative for Personal Rights, who has brought the two cases to court, stated "This is a very welcome decision. It addresses a great injustice suffered by Bahai citizens who face arbitrary and discriminatory practices based on their religious beliefs. We urge that the authorities implement the Administrative Court's decision." The chief judge in the court case stated that while the Baha'i Faith is still not recognized as one of the three officially recognized state religions, they will enjoy the right to refuse to identify oneself as one of those three religions, and will have access to state cards. Egyptian Ministry of Interior was slow to implement the ruling: as of April 22, 2008, no identification cards had been issued to Baháʼís.

=== Other court cases ===
Since the December 16, 2006, decision by Egypt's Supreme Administrative Court, two other court cases addressing the rights of Egyptian Baháʼís to obtain basic identity documents and education have been brought up. The first case, which was filed in February 2007, was brought forward by the Egyptian Initiative for Personal Rights (EIPR) on behalf of a Baháʼí university student, Hosni Hussein Abdel-Massih. Abdel-Massih was suspended from the Suez Canal University's Higher Institute of Social Work since he was unable to obtain an identity card due to his religious affiliation. The Court of Administrative Justice in Cairo was to decide on this case on September 5, 2007 but postponed the decision to October 30, 2007. The case was further postponed, for the fifth time on January 22, 2008, for an anticipated verdict during the January 29, 2008, court session. On January 29, 2008, Cairo's court of Administrative Justice ruled in favour of the Baháʼís, allowing them to obtain identification documents, so long as they omit their religion on court documents.

The second case involved two 14-year-old twins who were unable to obtain birth certificates unless they converted to a recognized religion. While the father of the twins had originally obtained birth certificates when the children were born in 1993 with their religious affiliation as Baháʼí, he was unable to obtain new birth certificates which contain the national number. Without the national number on the birth certificate, the children were unable to enroll in public schools. Since the Supreme Administrative Court's decision in 2006 found that the government had the right to deny Egyptian Baháʼís identity documents recognizing their religious affiliation, the EIPR modified the requested remedies in the case; the issue before the Court of Administrative Justice is whether Baháʼís can obtain documents without any religious affiliation or without falsely identifying oneself as one of the recognized religions. This court case was also set to be decided up on September 5, 2007, but the decision has also been postponed to October 30, 2007. As with the other court case, Cairo's court of Administrative Justice also ruled in favour of the Baháʼís, allowing them to obtain birth certificates, if they omit their religion on the documents. The EIPR stated that they will immediately seek to obtain papers for the twins.

== Regulation changed to reflect ruling and first cards issued ==
To comply with the January 2008 ruling, on April 14, 2009, the interior minister of Egypt released a decree amending the law to allow Egyptians who are not Muslim, Christian, or Jewish to obtain identification documents that list a dash in place of one of the three recognized religions. The first identification cards were issued to two Baháʼís (the two twins who have turned 16 by then) under the new decree on August 8, 2009.

The state of things after the 2011 Egyptian revolution is not clear. There have been renewed threats from some quarters of Egyptian society. In late 2012 Dr. Ibrahim Ghoniem, acting Minister of Education and member of the Muslim Brotherhood stated his opinion the Baháʼí children would be excluded from the Egyptian school system. Related comments also put in doubt the status of the Identification Controversy.

== See also ==
- Baháʼí Faith in Egypt
- Mohammed Hegazy
