= Baháʼí Faith in China =

The Baháʼí Faith was first introduced in China during the lifetime of its founder, Baháʼu'lláh (1817–1892).

China has long been considered by the Baháʼí Faith as a country with great future, but also spiritually, having the capacity to be "a bright candle of the world of humanity" "promot[ing] the principles of divine civilization." Also ʻAbdu'l-Bahá made reference in 1917 to making arrangements to travel himself to Kashgar in western China to teach the Chinese people and had obtained a passport but was prevented from going by the Ottoman authorities. The Association of Religion Data Archives (relying mostly on the World Christian Encyclopedia) estimated some 6000 Baháʼís in 2005.

== History ==
The first record of a Baháʼí living in China is of a Persian, Hájí Mírzá Muhammad-'Alí, who lived in Shanghai from 1862 to 1868. He moved to Hong Kong in 1870, was joined by his brother and they established a trading company there. They stayed until 1897. In the period of 1881-1882 a nephew of the wife of the Báb resided in Hong Kong.

Miza Abdu'l-Fadl Gulpaygani a notable Islamic and Baháʼí scholar, in frequent contact with ʻAbdu'l-Bahá, is reported to have visited Kashgar in 1891.

Other Baháʼís established residence in Shanghai in the early 1900s, one staying until his death in 1924.

The Baháʼí Writings acknowledge that Baháʼí "pioneers" reached China early.

Numerous foreign Baháʼís traveled to China during the non-war years. Some stayed for short periods to meet with residents and others or to give presentations to those interested. Others made long term visits, visiting many cities, giving press interviews, and meeting with notable Chinese personages.

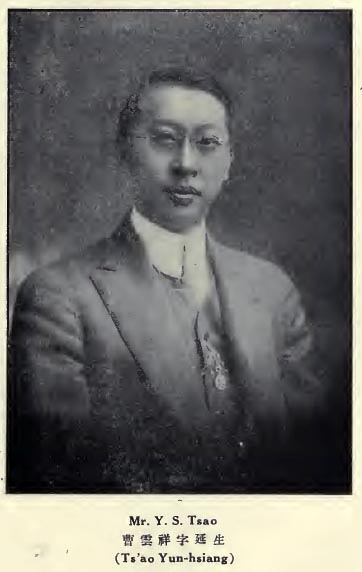
Cao Yun Xiang, President of Tsinghua University from 1920 to 1928, became a Baha'i in 1924.

Chief among this latter group was Martha Root who made three trips to China (1923–1924, 1930, 1937) - the first trip lasting for almost a year. She traveled extensively in China, lectured at many universities, had dozens of press interviews (e.g. The North China Standard, Tuesday, September 25, 1923; The Peking Daily News, October 4, 1923), buoyed the spirits of Chinese Baháʼís, and had meetings with persons notable in the history of China (e.g. Sun Yat-sen the first President of the Republic of China 1912–14; Dr. Cao Yun Xiang (also transliterated as Dr. Y.S. Tsao or Cao Qinwu) who was President of Tsinghua University from 1922 to 1928 and who became a Baháʼí in 1924.

Another source of the spread of the Baháʼí Faith to China was the travel of Chinese citizens abroad for study or work. From 1920 to 1940, China sent many scholars overseas. Some of them became Baháʼís. Chen Hai An (also transliterated as T.J. Chwang or Harold A. Chen), who is regarded as the first Chinese to accept the Baháʼí Faith, attended Baháʼí meetings in Chicago and returned to Shanghai in 1916.

Another early adherent, Mr. Liao Chongzhen (also transliterated as Chan Sung Liu), heard of the Baháʼí Faith while studying at Cornell University about 1921. He returned to Guangzhou (Canton) to become a professor at Sun Yat-sen University and a Head of the department of sericulture in the Chinese government. His article, "A Chinese view of the Baháʼí Cause", appeared in the Baháʼí World 1932-1934.

Dr. Cao Yun Xiang translated many Baháʼí books including Baháʼu'lláh and the New Era published in 1931, Paris Talks and major parts of Some Answered Questions. Dr. Cao wrote in 1930:

"To a real Baháʼí believer, the sight of human sufferings, ignorance and poverty will redouble his efforts to work for their improvement. Vainglory, pride and selfish gains will naturally be banished from one's thoughts. China decidedly needs such men and everybody knows it and feels it keenly. If the Baháʼí Cause can supply such men, China will accept this Cause willingly and eagerly."

== Growth ==
The Baha'i community began to be more firmly established in Shanghai with the arrival of several pioneers. In 1921, the first publication in Chinese, was printed by the Baháʼís in Shanghai. In 1928 the first Local Spiritual Assembly in China was formed there. Other smaller communities had emerged by that time in Beijing, Guangzhou and Harbin.

During World War II, despite the difficulties in communication, some correspondence between Shoghi Effendi, then head of the Baháʼí Faith, and the mainland Chinese Baháʼís continued.

After the Second World War, all but one of the foreign Baháʼís, Husayn Usquli, had to leave China but growth still occurred among native Chinese and in surrounding communities.

Starting in the 1950s new virgin territories were opened to the Baháʼí Faith: Macao in 1953 and Hainan Island in 1959.

In 1957 the first National Spiritual Assembly of North East Asia was elected with an area of jurisdiction embracing Japan, Korea, Taiwan (Formosa), Macao, Hong Kong, Hainan Island and Sakhalin Island.

In 1967 the National Spiritual Assembly of the Baháʼís of Taiwan was established. In 1974 the National Spiritual Assembly of the Baháʼís of Hong Kong was established. In 1989 the National Spiritual Assembly of the Baháʼís of Macao was established.

As China expanded her efforts of reform and increased its interactions with the worldwide community more Baháʼís moved to China.

== Administration and membership ==
There is no formal Baháʼí administrative system established in mainland China, though there is such a system formally established in Taiwan, Hong Kong and Macao (where the Baháʼí community is one of the five major religious communities in that Special Administrative Region).

The formal administrative structure used by the Baháʼí Faith in many parts of the world is strongly linked to the teachings given by Baháʼu'lláh. Within a country, this structure consists of Local Spiritual Assemblies (at the community level) and a National Spiritual Assembly with subsidiary Committees, Boards or Councils. Both Spiritual Assemblies are elected annually and made up of nine persons resident in that community or that country, respectively.

Only formally registered Baháʼís may contribute to the Baháʼí Funds. No external funds are accepted for activities that are strictly religious in character or for other endeavors that relate to the internal development of the Baháʼí community.

As a result of the lack of formal registration and structure, it is difficult to ascertain with some degree of certainty, the number of Baháʼís in China. The number of active followers of Baháʼu'lláh's Teachings in China has spread beyond the scope of knowledge of the existing administrative structures. Certainly there are active followers of the teachings of Baháʼu'lláh in all of the major cities of China and in many regional centers and rural areas. China also has a substantial community of interest that see in the Baháʼí Writings guidance on how to live better lives, build a stronger family, be better parents, help their neighborhoods, communities and country by practicing all or part of the Baháʼí Teachings.

In recent years the foreign Baháʼís living in China, in consultation with the relevant local authorities, have formed Foreign Baháʼí Associations. Currently there are Foreign Baháʼí Associations in six cities (Beijing, Shanghai, Dalian, Tianjin, Ningbo and Shenzhen). They gather, with the knowledge of local authorities, in certain designated public places for spiritual gatherings, the observance of Baháʼí Holy Days and activities related to the spiritual education of their children and junior youth. These groups also aim to demonstrate the sincerity and the desire of foreign Baháʼís to contribute to the advancement of China and its peoples.

The Association of Religion Data Archives (relying mostly on the World Christian Encyclopedia) estimated some 6000 Baháʼís in 2005.

== Cooperation with government and academia ==
To be loyal to the government and serve society is a firm foundation of Baháʼí belief,

"In the same way that Baháʼu'lláh assured the monarchs of His day that 'It is not Our wish to lay hands on your kingdoms', so the Baháʼí community has no political agenda, abstains from all involvement in partisan activity, and accepts unreservedly the authority of civil government in public affairs."

— The Universal House of Justice, Century of Light

Government, scholars and non-governmental agencies in China, independently or in cooperation with the Spiritual Assemblies of the Baháʼís of Macao and Hong Kong and other Baháʼí organizations, have investigated Baháʼí principles, ideas and approaches as a means for advancing knowledge through discourse and for making social and economic development more effective. In recent years this has resulted in a significant number of cooperative activities. For example, the Chinese Academy of Social Sciences, Shandong University, and Peking University have each established, on their own initiative, a Center of Baháʼí Studies.

In the fall of 1995, some 500 Baha'is from more than 50 countries journeyed to China to contribute to two gatherings called by the United Nations: the Fourth World Conference on Women held in Beijing 4–15 September 1995 and the Nongovernmental Organization (NGO) Forum on Women held in Huairou, 30 August to 8 September 1995. The NGO Forum had approximately 30,000 women and men attending. Baha'is sponsored, coordinated, or organized more than 30 workshops at the Forum. The Fourth World Conference on Women in Beijing had some 17,000 people registered. Seven Baháʼí delegations were accredited to the main conference and, in addition, two organizations founded by Baha'is sent delegations.

Good working relationships have been developed with China's State Administration for Religious Affairs (SARA). In 1993, SARA invited a delegation of the Spiritual Assembly of the Baháʼís of Macao to visit various government agencies in Beijing. This was the first time a Baháʼí institution carried out a formal exchange with the Chinese government in recent history. Subsequent delegations have visited Beijing, Shanghai, and the provinces of Shaanxi and Gansu. Directors General of SARA have led delegations to visit the Spiritual Assembly of the Baháʼís of Macao and later to Israel including a visit to the Baháʼí World Centre. The chairman of the Spiritual Assembly of the Baháʼís of Macao was invited, together with leading figures of the major religious groups in Macao, to attend the opening and closing ceremonies of the 2008 Beijing Olympic Games. The following year, the chairman of the Spiritual Assembly was invited to the commemoration of the 60th anniversary of the founding of the People's Republic of China.

== Similarities with traditional Chinese beliefs ==
According to Albert Cheung, there are many aspects of Baháʼu'lláh's teachings that match well with traditional Chinese religious and philosophical beliefs such as : 1) the Great Unity (world peace); 2) unity of the human family; 3) service to others; 4) moral education; 5) extended family values; 6) the investigation of truth; 7) the Highest Reality (God); 8) the common foundation of religions; 9) harmony in Nature; 10) the purpose of tests and suffering; and 11) moderation in all things.

Because of the similarity with the concept of Great Unity, Baháʼí Faith was previously referred as the Religion of Great Unity (大同教) in Chinese.

== See also ==
- Religion in China
- Hilda Yen
