= Liao Deshan =

Chinese educator

Liao Deshan Liu Takshan
- 廖德山
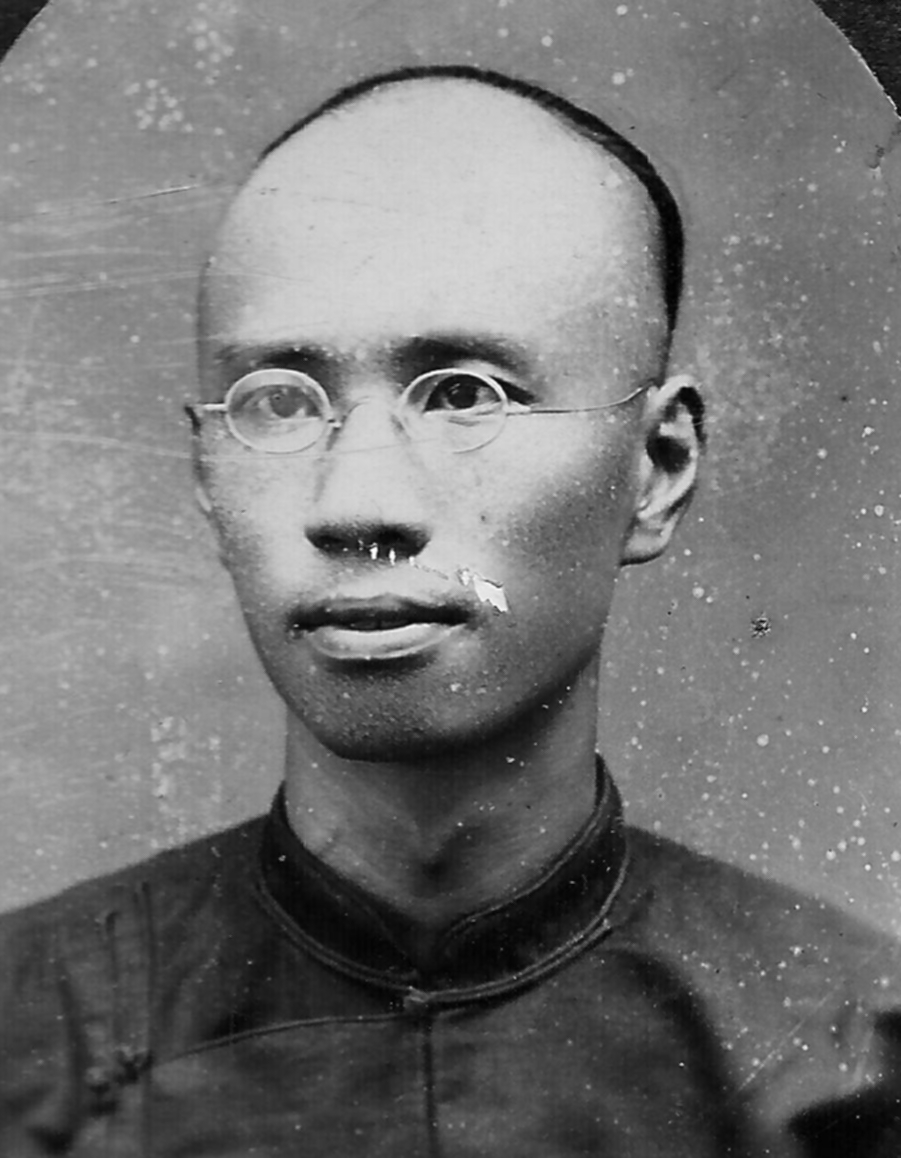
- Liu Deshan

Personal details
- Born: 22 March 1866 Panyu, Guangdong
- Died: 2 September 1923 (aged 25) Canton, China
- Resting place: Canton, China
- Spouse: Kwei Hueng To
- Children: 廖奉献 (Liao Fengxian) 廖奉恩 (Liao Fengen) 廖奉基(Liao Fengji) 廖崇真 (Liao Chongzhen); Liao Fengging 廖奉灵 (Liao Fengling) 廖崇圣 (Liao Chongshen) 廖奉洁 (Liao Fengjie) 廖崇国 (Liao Chongguo) 廖奉贞 (Liao Fengzhen)
- Occupation: Doctor

Liao Deshan (Chinese: 廖德山; was a Chinese educator of the early 20th century. He was a close friend and advisor of Sun Yat-sen and revolutionaries held meetings at his home. Liao's family played an instrumental role in the modernisation of education in China and in 1890 he also founded Pui Ching Middle Schools 培正中学.

== Birth and family background ==
Liao Deshan was born in Canton in 1866.

His father Liao Xin Tiangong 廖莘田公 and his elder brother were orphans in the mid 19th century. They roamed the streets of Guangzhou, where some Christian proselytizers had set up feeding stations for the hordes of suffering humanity displaced by war and misrule of the Manchus. At age 14, he converted to Christianity. He was self-educated. He became a doctor of Chinese medicine, a Baptist minister fluent in English, and an admirer of democracy.

== Education years ==
Liao Deshan became also a Baptist minister and earned the license of Christian practice as a medical doctor from the Hong Kong College of Medicine for Chinese (the forerunner of the University of Hong Kong) in 1892. There he met Sun Yat-sen. Notably, of their class of 12 students, he and Sun were the only two who graduated. Sun Yat-sen played an instrumental role in the overthrow of the Qing dynasty and was appointed to serve as Provisional President of the Republic of China, when it was founded in 1912. When Liao Deshan and Sun Yat-sen returned to Guangzhou, Liao's home became a meeting place for the revolutionaries and Liao became one of the founders of Kuomintang. Liao Deshan believed in universal suffrage, advocated the equality of the sexes, education of women, unbinding women's feet, and abolishing polygamy. He, along with Sun and others, went into exile in Japan in 1908, when the Manchus came after them. In 1890 he found the Pui Ching Middle Schools 培正中学 which is still a thriving institution in Hong Kong and Macau, which insisted on excellence in both Chinese and Math, way ahead of his time. Two Nobel Prize winners in physics were students there. He, unusual in his time, or any time, actually practiced what he preached. When he was a young doctor during the 1880s and 1890s, he went from village to village, offering medical care. When the peasants couldn't pay him, they often asked what they could do for him. He asked if they would allow him to unbind their daughters' feet. Quite often, the peasants allowed him; even though it was dangerous to go against age-old customs, because he had saved lives and spared them pain. When his eldest daughter asked why he was so adamant in unbinding women's feet, he replied: "Because women pass their pains onto their children." Liao Deshan originated the slogan: 'Save China through education'.

== Family life ==
Liao Deshan had one wife, and 10 children. Three sons and seven daughters, none of the girls had bound feet, which was rare during the last days of the Qing dynasty. He was employed at Lingnan as a doctor and physiology professor. in exchange for his services he asked his children to be studying there for free. Then, through his connection with the churches in New England, he managed to have almost all his children (his last daughter reached maturity after the passing of her father so was not able to do further studies) to be university educated.

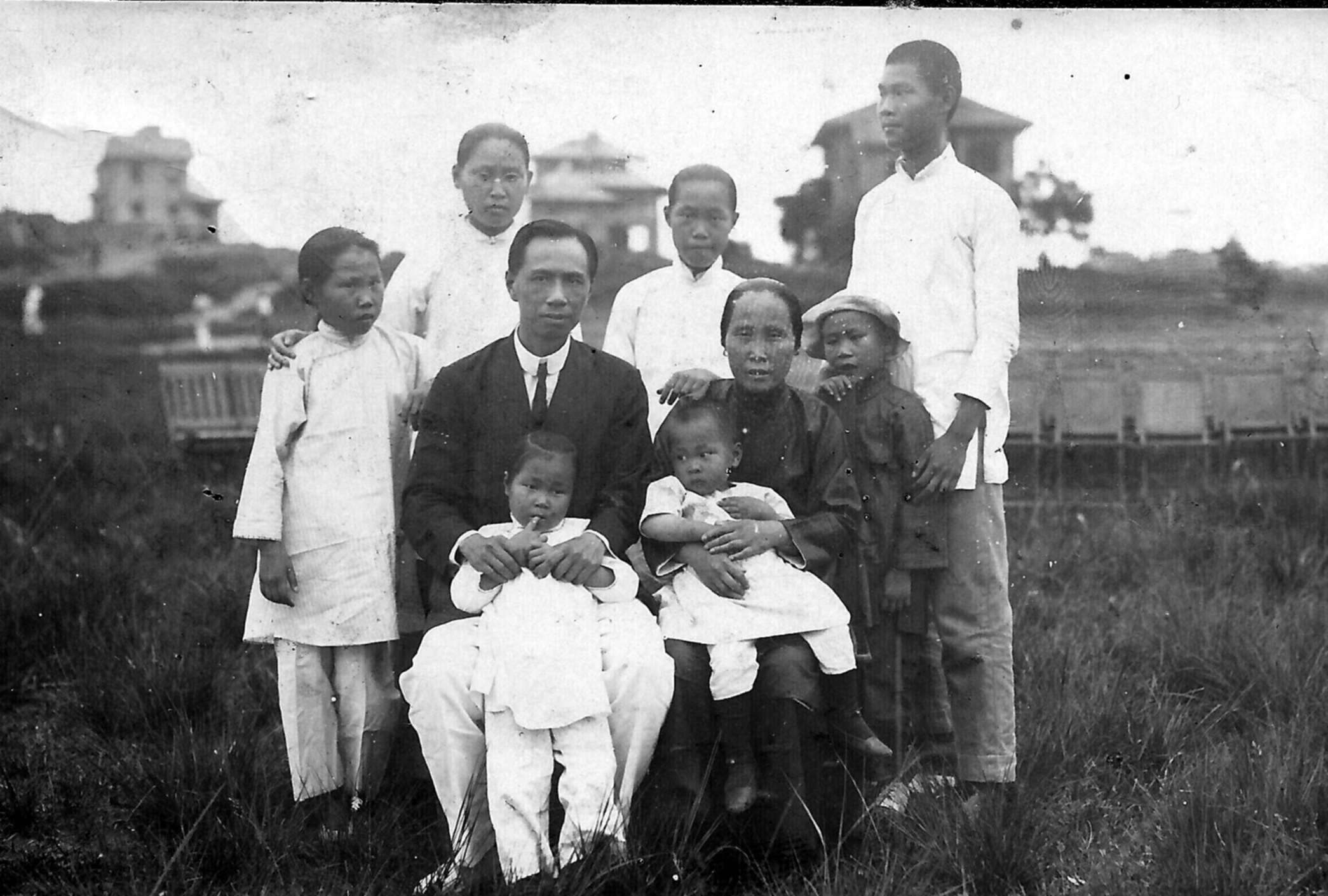
Liu Deshan and family

All his children were outstanding people who dedicated their lives to 'Change through education' and all studied at Lingnan University (Guangzhou), (the number in parentheses after their name indicates the order of birth):

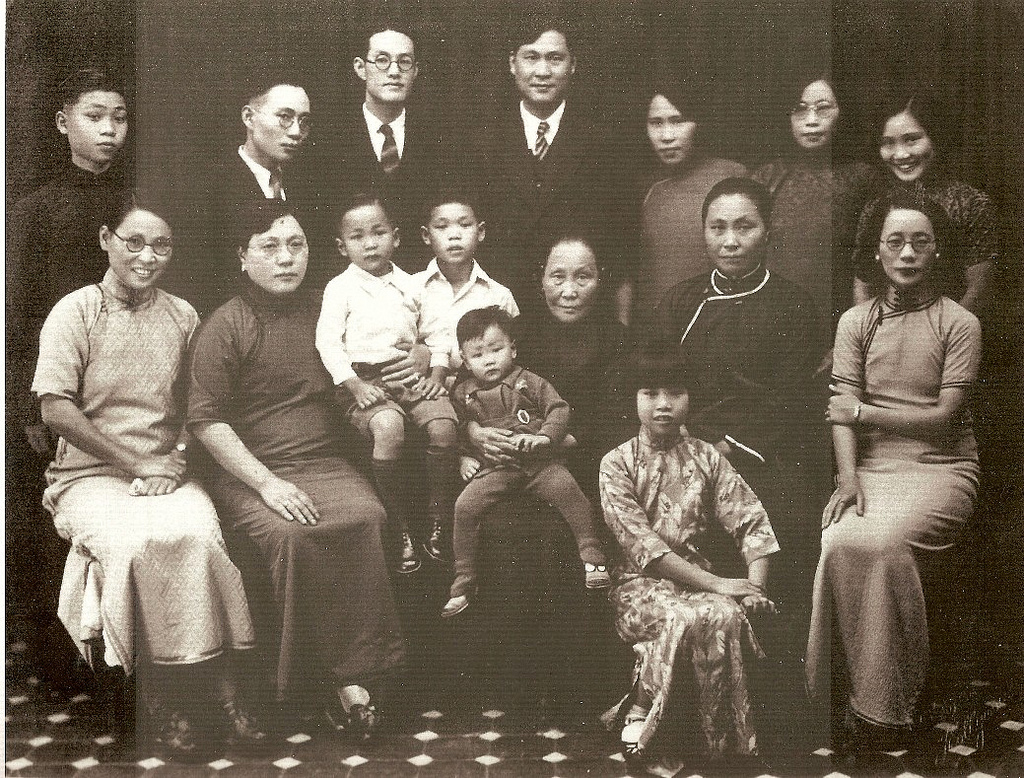
Liao Chongzhen and family

廖奉献 (Liao Fengxian) (1) was educated at the College of Wooster and at Wellesley College got a Master in education at Columbia University and was one of the earliest women who went to graduate school. She was instrumental in opening up Chinese universities to women. After she came back to China she served as first dean of the Women's College of Lingnan University.

廖奉恩 (Liao Fengen) (2) was the first Chinese woman who went to Smith College and also got a Master in education from Columbia University. When she returned to Guangzhou she served as Soong Ching-ling (Madame Sun Yat-Sen)'s English secretary; then she served as vice-principal of 广州执信中学 Zhixin High School in 1924 and principal from 1937. She served also on the board of directors of Lingnan University from 1926. Liao Fengen helped translating the famous Baháʼí journalist Martha Root in her visit to Canton in 1924. On 11 April 1924 she wrote to Martha Root:

"I want to assure you that during your brief visit in Canton you have sown seeds for the Baháʼí Cause which, in due time, will bring forth a thousand folds. You have certainly given a new impetus to my religious life. I have found in the Baháʼí teachings that something which I have hitherto sought for in vain. I find that it satisfied both the requirements of the intellect and the longings of the heart. The Baháʼí movement appeals to me in that it is a movement for the doing away of all kinds of prejudice, which is so detrimental to all kinds of thinking both spiritually and intellectually and for the ushering in of the new era of universal brotherhood through the spirit of good will."

廖奉基 (Liao Fengji) (3) after studying at Lingnan University and UK she moved to study her master at Bryn Mawr College in 1918. She was the first Chinese to enter Bryan Mawr. In 1925 she founded 粤华中学 (Yuet Wah College), and she served as its president for over 20 years.

廖崇真 (Liao Chongzhen) (4) was a Chinese government official and president of the College of Agriculture at Sun Yat-sen University. He was appointed to director of the Department of Sericulture under the Kuomintang (KMT), achieving a great improvement of agriculture through Guangdong province. Many dams. bridges and irrigation canals in Guangdong province were named by him. During his lifetime he was also a prominent member of the Baháʼí Faith doing many translations from Bahá'u'lláh's and 'Abdu'l-Bahá's writings into Chinese.

Liao Fengging (5) who died at age 25 in Canton

廖奉灵 (Liao Fengling) (6) when was a child was presented by her mother to Dr. Sun Yat-Ssen, he stroke her head and said: "You will grow up to do great things for the country." She studied at the University of Michigan, where she heard about the Baháʼí Faith from Martha Root. In 1931, on her way back to China she stopped in Yokohama, Japan, where she met Agnes Alexander, Keith Ransom-Kehler and some Japanese friends. Agnes Alexander recalls:

"While her steamer was in port in Yokohama, Miss Liu came to Tokyo and spent a night with us. It was an especially happy occasion, as it was the evening when we held a Baháʼí meeting and a spiritual unity was made between this Chinese young woman and the Japanese friends".

She was he first Chinese president of Concordia College for women (广州市协和中学), which in 1937 was ranked by the Ministry of Education as one of the top nine secondary schools in the country and had a 100% rate of students passing the entry examinations to Chinese Universities. In January 1939 she wrote to Martha Root to say she was now in charge of a normal school with 300 students, and that she often thought of Miss Root and her "inspiring personality and of the Cause you are trying to promote and spread throughout the world". After difficult times during the Cultural Revolution, her life of service in education continued and she served as deputy director of the city department of education. She also served as a member of the municipal Chinese People's Political Consultative Conference Standing Committee, vice chairman of the city Democratic Foundation and as president of the Guangzhou Children's Welfare Association. In 1976 was the head of the reform in English teaching in Guangzhou. An award bearing her name has been created in Guangzhou, the 'Liao Fengling award' for outstanding teaching as well a kindergarten bearing her name.

廖崇圣 (Liao Chongshen) (7) who became a famous journalist and served as editor of Central Daily News, the KMT's official paper and then moved to US, where he worked for Voice of America for the remaining part of his life

廖奉洁 (Liao Fengjie) (8) also studied at the University of Michigan and worked in Hong Kong and Macau Pui Ching Middle School.

廖崇国 (Liao Chongguo) (9) who became a renowned ophthalmologist

廖奉贞 (Liao Fengzhen) (10) studied at the Sun Yat-Sen University and after her studies founded an orphanage.

== In popular culture ==
A documentary on the life of his eldest son, Liao Chongzhen, has been directed by Vargha Mazlum and was released on 21 April 2015. Liao Chong Zhen Liao Chongzhen – A bright candle of the light of humanity
