= James Wesley Turpin =

James Turpin
- Born: James Wesley Turpin; December 18, 1927 (age 98); Ashland, Kentucky
- Education: Emory University
- Known for: Project Concern International & Wrongful life court case
- Spouse(s): Martha Williamson (1949–1974); Donna Wrenn Turner (1975–2018 (her death))

James Wesley Turpin (born December 18, 1927) is an American physician and former-preacher-turned-Baháʼí. He is the founder and director of Project Concern International (PCI) and an activist against the impact of war and poverty on young people in Asia.

Turpin was raised in eastern Kentucky in Ashland. In 1960 he began a lifelong activism for those suffering from lack of medical care and impoverished living conditions notably in Hong Kong, Vietnam, and Appalachia, through Project Concern International and gained respect from those he helped and recognition from service oriented institutions for it. Conflict over medical advice his family was personally given gave rise to a new field of tort law called wrongful life. He currently lives in western North Carolina and continues his activism.

== Earliest years ==
James Wesley Turpin, was born about 1928 and was raised in eastern Kentucky in Ashland. His parents were Evelyn Hope Duke and James William 'Bill' Turpin. James William was a safety engineer in the company that became Armco Steel Corp. His mother's father was John Wesley Duke, a doctor, and much of a model for young Turpin. Jim has a brother, William.

== Early adulthood ==
In high school Turpin had been granted a "local license" to preach at five area churches. In World War II Turpin served in the Navy as a medic. He got into college on a veteran's assistance program at Emory University. He initially sought to go to medical school but after failing an organic chemistry class he was advised away from medicine and instead studying theology with the Candler School. However one year into the theology school he successfully took a chemistry class, so he added going to the medical school as a fulfillment of his childhood aims modeled on his grandfather. He graduated with a Bachelor of Science in 1949. In 1949 he also married Martha (often Mollie or Molly) Williamson of Georgia who had graduated the same year. They had four children; their first child was born about 1951, the same year he finished his theology degree. He was ordained as a Methodist minister in 1954 and finished his medical degree in 1955. The family moved to Coronado, California in 1957 after a short period of service in Georgia.

In Coronado he bought a successful medical practice with a salary reportedly of over $50k/year, from a retiring physician. Turpin was elected to the city council in San Diego, served as a Sunday School teacher at the Methodist Church and was elected the vice president of the local Parent-Teacher Association. Still, as he said in his biographical article, and first book, he was not satisfied that he had a meaningful life and was restless and elsewhere said: "A vague but disturbing disenchantment set in."

== Project Concern ==
Through an adult class at a Methodist church he learned of the Casa de Todos clinic in Tijuana, Mexico, in about 1960. He reflected on the experience in a 1967 article. There he was able to save the lives of two children during a period he volunteered one day a week. But he found he needed to do something more substantial than just be one doctor in one place of need. He initiated Project Concern to organize the work and it was incorporated in 1961. He first focused on Casa de Todos.

=== Going international ===
Turpin had tried to join various services that could be vehicles for his work, but either got no replies or they wanted other things than what he could provide. He was attracted to the work of Dr. Tom Dooley who had previously worked in medical relief in Vietnam. He got the idea of going to Hong Kong because of some TV coverage related through a patient's mother at Casa de Todos. He left for Hong Kong in September 1961 on an exploratory trip to feel out the need, logistics and possibilities. From this exploration his attention was focused on two areas − the people living on boats and the Kowloon Walled City. He ran into legal and cultural protocols he had failed to appreciate, and needed to register with the "British Medical Council" to run a clinic. They gained a match because they were a nurses group who needed a doctor and had patients and he was a doctor that needed patients.

He gained more assistants willing to do the work in 1962 and he embarked on a fund-raising tour. He also expanded the initial land based clinic with a boat-clinic named "Yauh Oi", Chinese for "Brotherly Love". Martha was a lab tech. There was an immediate satisfaction from being close to suffering and being able to make a difference. News of the work had spread and in late December Turpin was on a Jaycee (United States Junior Chamber) list of Ten Outstanding Young Americans for his project.

By 1963 he was raising funds from Australia and US. His family moved to Hong Kong and he closed the practice in the States. Through the year Project Concern continued to grow with assistants.

One of the volunteer doctors working in Hong Kong related that he had seen similar intense suffering and privation in Vietnam on the way north. In 1964 Project Concern expanded into Vietnam, during the Vietnam War, including training local volunteers in a network across nearby villages - a program that was expanded by 1967, earning local trust. Assisting in the development of self-help became a clear goal of the organization.

=== An enterprise ===
Project Concern was then widely promoted as independent of government or religion, relying solely on private contributions and not formally presenting religion in the process (though still promoted in some instances religiously), with individuals of some 20 nationalities among 100 staff by 1965. Contributions and money arrived from further afield in 1965, including the support of then Miss America for 1966. Some work of the project included school classes with students from Stanford working for a time. In 1965-66 his wife and children returned to the States and Martha began going to medical school.

In 1963, perhaps reflecting his own restlessness in earlier years and why he worked in the project, Turpin said: "A rut is like a grave with the ends knocked out. I think probably a lot of people are living in a rut and don't know why and I've got a possible solution for them in Project Concern."

In 1966 Turpin was using words of the 17th century poet John Donne in publicity of Project Concern such as "No man is an island entire of itself… any man's death diminishes me because I am involved in mankind. And therefore never seem to know for who the bell tolls - it tolls for thee." There were four clinics in Vietnam plus Hong Kong and Tijuana.

In 1966 his book Vietnam Doctor: the story of Project Concern was published, was reviewed over the years and donated to libraries.

Meanwhile, Turpin embarked on a fund-raising tour for Project Concern, noting it was $20,000 a month to run the set of clinics circa 1966, and newspapers also mentioned his wife's progress in medical school in 1967. She was nearly finished by 1969.

Turpin had an article published in the Guideposts magazine which was then often echoed in many newspapers under various titles:

- "The only way to belong to life"
- "God has never failed us",
- "A dream becomes a reality"
- "Their victory for us all in Vietnam"
- "I had failed to take the first little step"

He used another quote to express the nature of the work of Project Concern - as Turpin heard volunteer Maria Meza say it: "Love you? I am you."

Turpin's time was split between fund-raising tours and work in the field across 1968 to 1970. He got two more assistants who were enthusiastic for the work. One of the innovations in fund-raising was named "Walk for Mankind" in 1969 which kept up in 1970 and 1971. The Walk was reflected on as originating with the Project in later years though it had since been used for other fund-raising goals (and has been used in other particulars - see Gerry Bertier and He Ain't Heavy, He's My Brother). Another innovation in fund-raising was a film Involved in mankind. The National Institutes of Health program of clinics was referenced needing the enthusiasm Turpin presented and inspired.

Turpin was still visibly noted as a Methodist minister.

Project Concern opened an Appalachia unit in Byrdstown, Tennessee in 1969 - a town with no doctor for 9 years and no dentist in 63 was served with a number of volunteers for a while. Farmington, New Mexico was added as another site.

Project Concern began to have regional offices.

In 1970 Turpin published his second book - A Faraway Country: The Continuing Story of Project Concern. He undertook a 1970 tour for funding, while adding a project site in Bisti, New Mexico, (near the Bisti/De-Na-Zin Wilderness.)

Project Concern was forced to leave Vietnam in 1972 during the later days of the war. Instead Turpin and Molly attended the national Project Concern meeting in March and they were profiled in a Good Housekeeping article. Turpin and Mollie did work together in Tennessee for Project Concern in 1973.

== Activism ==
With the escalating concerns about war in Vietnam he spoke publicly about his views of the apparent priorities of winning the war but losing the people:

- "People who live under pathological conditions are going to choose pathological solutions to solve their problems"

In 1967 he became more vocal:

- "It costs $224,000 to kill one Viet Cong (and half of that)… can educate thousands"
- "If we had done in 1945 in Asia what we did in Europe with the Marshall Plan, the crisis in Asia would not have developed."
- "I'm not a militarist or even a strategist. All I know is the TB, hookworm, and malnutrition which sap the people of Vietnam."

Turpin promoted the idea of shifting the orientation in the war to what he called at the time "nation builders" of skilled staff to help transform society - his list was "doctors, dentists, nurses, laboratory techs, sanitationists, teachers, agricultural technicians, civil engineers, animal husbandry technicians, and cottage industry technicians." Other quotes at the time showing his thinking include:

- "It takes $260,000 to kill one VC and one cent a meal to feed a Vietnam child."
- "I am confident we need these people as much as they need us."
- "We have an increasing number of people who don't have any feelings about anything - they're called 'silent sinners'."
- "The bird who bothers me most is not the hawk or the dove, but the ostrich - so many people have their heads in the sand."

He sent a plan for peace to Vietnamese and US governments centered around social development.

He became hopeful while still seeking to energize youth - "Our troublers of today have been there for years, but we are more concerned now. We are coming to grips with our problems like we never have before. We have never had such idealistic times." He focused the attention of people who read and heard him speak that the problem was poverty instead of politics.

Turpin advocated for ways for youth to participate in the troubles in society and gained a wristband of brotherhood with the Montagnard or Degar people of Vietnam in 1971. Doctors continued to join in the work - one for Appalachia in 1971. Meanwhile, Molly finished her internship. They considered working at the new Arizona project.

Turpin spoke at the Winter 1972 Jaycee conference concerned with furthering brotherhood through the world and reflected on how he got started but that the situation in American was suffering too:

- "make the Bill of Rights and Declaration of Independence come alive."
- "a revolution in the attitudes toward building a brave, new world."
- "I've had a bellyful of the Great White Father."

== New life ==
Turpin ended being general director of Project Concern in 1974, lost his elder son in a plane crash, was divorced, and joined the Baháʼí Faith. He continued the work in Appalachia relief and his conversion lead him to meet Donna Wrenn Turner, who had been a member of the religion since 1964 and they were soon married, (in a Baháʼí ceremony.) Turpin appeared in a very few fund-raisers for Project Concern in 1975 - the same year Turpin and Wrenn (as she is known) had their first child.

=== Wrongful life case ===
By the later 1970s it was clear his two new daughters were deaf. Soon a case was filed pointing to wrongful genetic counseling - it was found he and Wrenn shared recessive genes such that there was a high chance of deaf children. The case escalated and became known as the Wrongful Life case.

Initially the family had moved to Guam about 1976–1977 to pioneer to support the Baháʼís and promote the religion while running a clinic on the island. However, when their eldest child's hearing problem was substantiated they moved back to California. In the midst of the case in May 1981 they moved to North Carolina and the case was finally settled in 1982.

=== Semi-retirement in North Carolina ===
In North Carolina Turpin was visible working for the Baháʼí Faith when he gave a couple of talks in 1982 about the religion and human action in Raleigh at North Carolina State University for the Baháʼí club in February. In March an interview of Turpin was published highlighting the persecution of Baháʼís in Iran since the Iranian Revolution of 1979.

In March 1986 he re-visited the Tijuana clinic and commented "My friends say I was always a Baháʼí." In May Turpin participated in a Peace Conference hosted by Baháʼís in Hawaii in honor of the International Year of Peace. Following improved relations with Vietnam he learned one of the hospitals he had built - and one of the trainees he had trained - was still operating in Vietnam. After making contact he was invited to visit and took the opportunity to promote peace. It was one of the hospitals originally funded by the American Legion.

Back in the States Turpin gave a talk on Vietnam for the Baháʼí club at University of North Carolina at Chapel Hill in the fall of 1989

In 1993, doing part-time work in occupational medicine in western NC, he was able to re-engage with a second of the hospitals in Vietnam he had founded through Project Concern.

Then he worked full-time with the North Carolina Department of Corrections with inmates across several counties of western NC, volunteered at a local clinic, and decided to bring an orchestra performance near the clinic.

In 2002 Turpin and Wrenn attended a fundraiser of Project Concern International.

== Awards ==
In 1962, Turpin was on the Jaycee list of ten outstanding young men. This was the start of a more than decade long relationship with the Jaycee's and funding for Turpin's work.

In 1963, the Freedom Leadership Medal was awarded to Turpin by Freedoms Foundation.

In 1993, he was awarded the International Humanity Award from the American Red Cross Overseas Association.

In 2011, he was awarded an Emory Medal, the highest honor for alumni of Emory University, Georgia.

== See also ==
- Christianity in Hong Kong
- Protestantism in Vietnam
- Baháʼí Faith in Hong Kong
- Baháʼí Faith in Vietnam
- FUNDAEC
- Marty Ravellette
