= Liao Chongzhen =

Chinese government official and president of the College of Agriculture

Liao Chongzhen Chan S. Liu
- 廖崇真
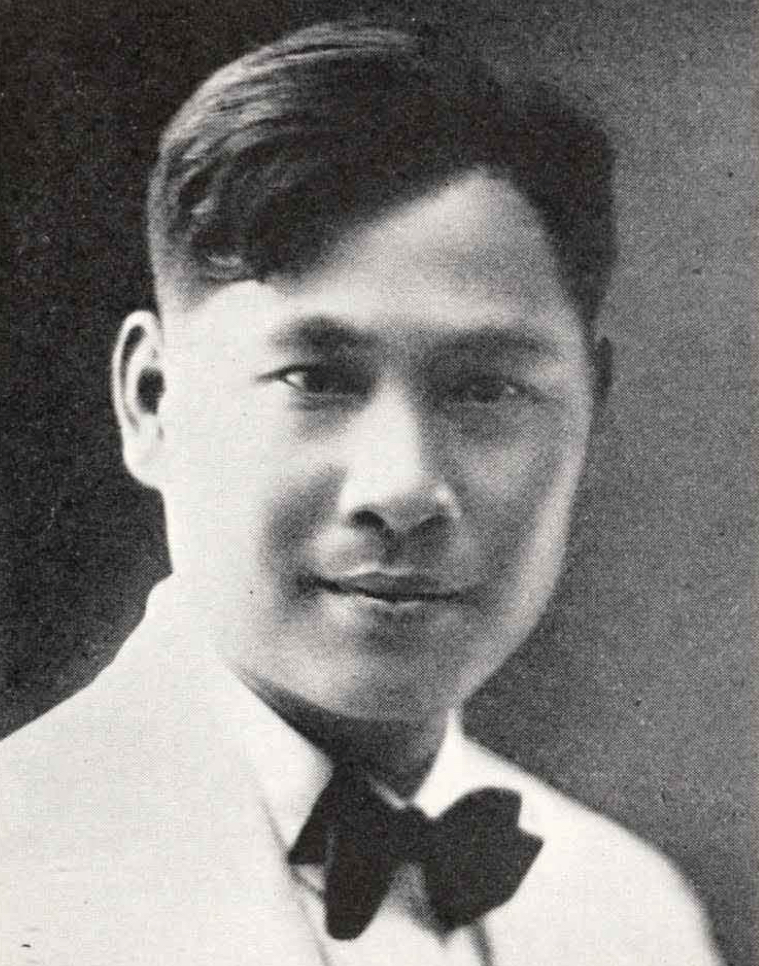
- Circa 1924

Personal details
- Born: 25 May 1898 Panyu, Guangdong
- Died: 12 September 1971 (aged 73) New York City
- Resting place: Manhattan Cemetery, Brooklyn, New York
- Spouse: Sun Lishu 孫麗淑 (1911–1995)
- Children: Da Tong 大同; Da Ming 大明; Da Hua 大華; Da Wai 大偉; Da Wen 大文
- Education: Cornell University
- Occupation: Government official

Liao Chongzhen (Chinese: 廖崇真; 25 May 1898 – 12 September 1971), also known as Chan Sung Liu, was a Chinese government official and president of the College of Agriculture at Sun Yat-sen University. He witnessed the establishment of the Republic of China and Sun Yat-sen and other revolutionary held meetings at his father's home. Liao's family played an instrumental role in the modernisation of education in China. He was appointed to director of the Department of Sericulture under the Kuomintang (KMT), achieving a great improvement of agriculture through Guangdong province. Many dams. bridges and irrigation canals in Guangdong province were named by him. During his lifetime he was also a prominent member of the Baháʼí Faith doing many translations from Bahá'u'lláh's and 'Abdu'l-Bahá's writings into Chinese.

== Birth and family background ==
Liao Chongzhen was born in Canton (now Guangzhou) on 25 May 1897. He was the fourth of ten children.

His grandfather Liao Xin Tiang 廖莘田 and his elder brother were orphans in the mid 19th century. They roamed the streets of Guangzhou, where some Christian proselytizers had set up feeding stations for the hordes of suffering humanity displaced by war and misrule of the Manchus. At age 14, he converted to Christianity. He was self-educated. He became a doctor of Chinese medicine, a Baptist minister fluent in English, and an admirer of democracy.

He had one son, Liao Deshan 廖德山.

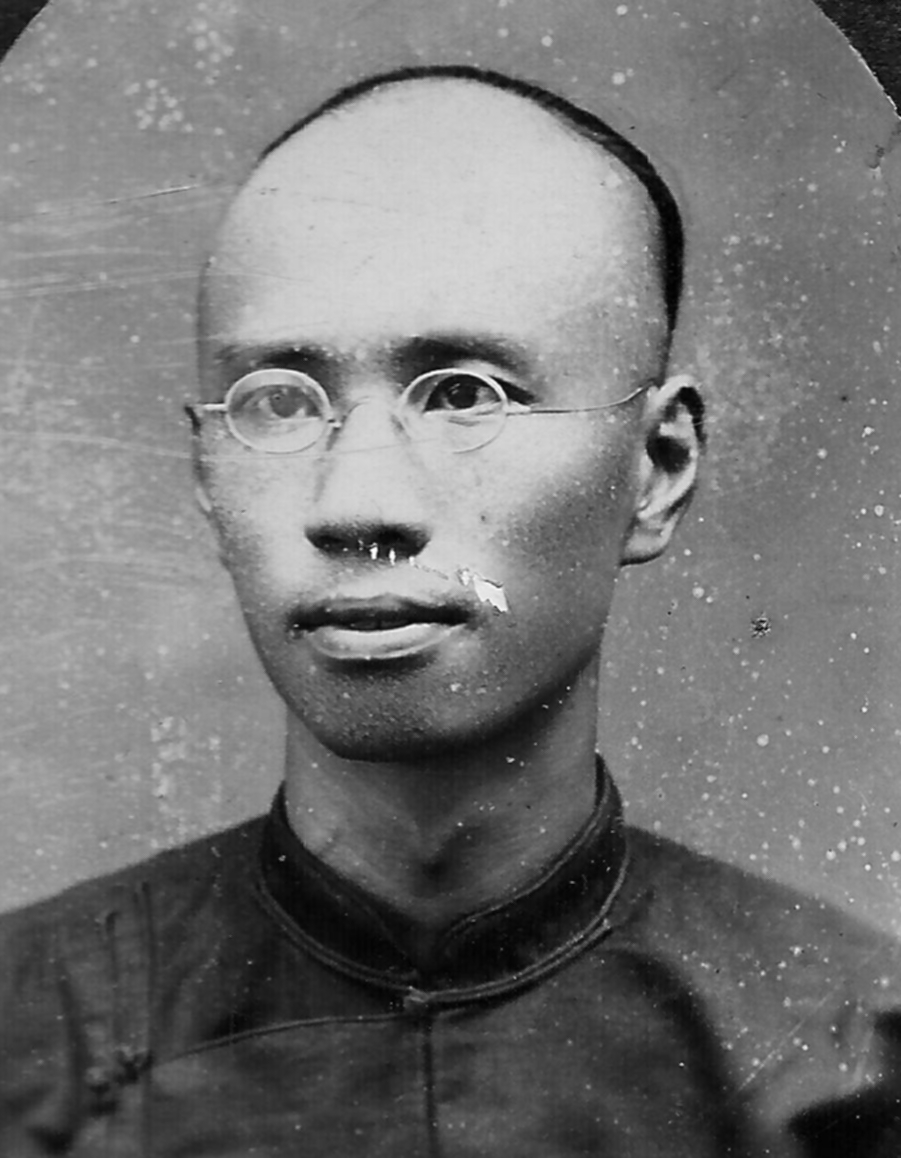
Liao Deshan

Liao Deshan became also a Baptist minister and earned the license of Christian practice as a medical doctor from the Hong Kong College of Medicine for Chinese (the forerunner of the University of Hong Kong) in 1892. There he met Sun Yat-sen. Notably, of their class of 12 students, he and Sun were the only two who graduated. Sun Yat-sen played an instrumental role in the overthrow of the Qing dynasty and was appointed to serve as Provisional President of the Republic of China, when it was founded in 1912. When Liao Deshan and Sun Yat-sen returned to Guangzhou, Liao's home became a meeting place for the revolutionaries and Liao became one of the founders of Kuomintang. Liao Deshan believed in universal suffrage, advocated the equality of the sexes, education of women, unbinding women's feet, and abolishing polygamy. He, along with Sun and others, went into exile in Japan in 1908, when the Manchus came after them. In 1890 he found the Pui Ching Middle Schools 培正中學 which is still a thriving institution in Hong Kong and Macau, which insisted on excellence in both Chinese and Math, way ahead of his time. Two Nobel Prize winners in physics were students there. He, unusual in his time, or any time, actually practiced what he preached. When he was a young doctor during the 1880s and 1890s, he went from village to village, offering medical care. When the peasants couldn't pay him, they often asked what they could do for him. He asked if they would allow him to unbind their daughters' feet. Quite often, the peasants allowed him; even though it was dangerous to go against age-old customs, because he had saved lives and spared them pain. When his eldest daughter asked why he was so adamant in unbinding women's feet, he replied: "Because women pass their pains onto their children." Liao Deshan originated the slogan: 'Save China through education'.

He had one wife, and 10 children. Three sons and seven daughters, none of the girls had bound feet, which was rare during the last days of the Qing dynasty. He was employed at Lingnan University 嶺南大學 as a doctor and physiology professor. in exchange for his services he asked his children to be studying there for free. Then, through his connection with the churches in New England, he managed to have almost all his children (his last daughter reached maturity after the passing of her father so was not able to do further studies) to be university educated.

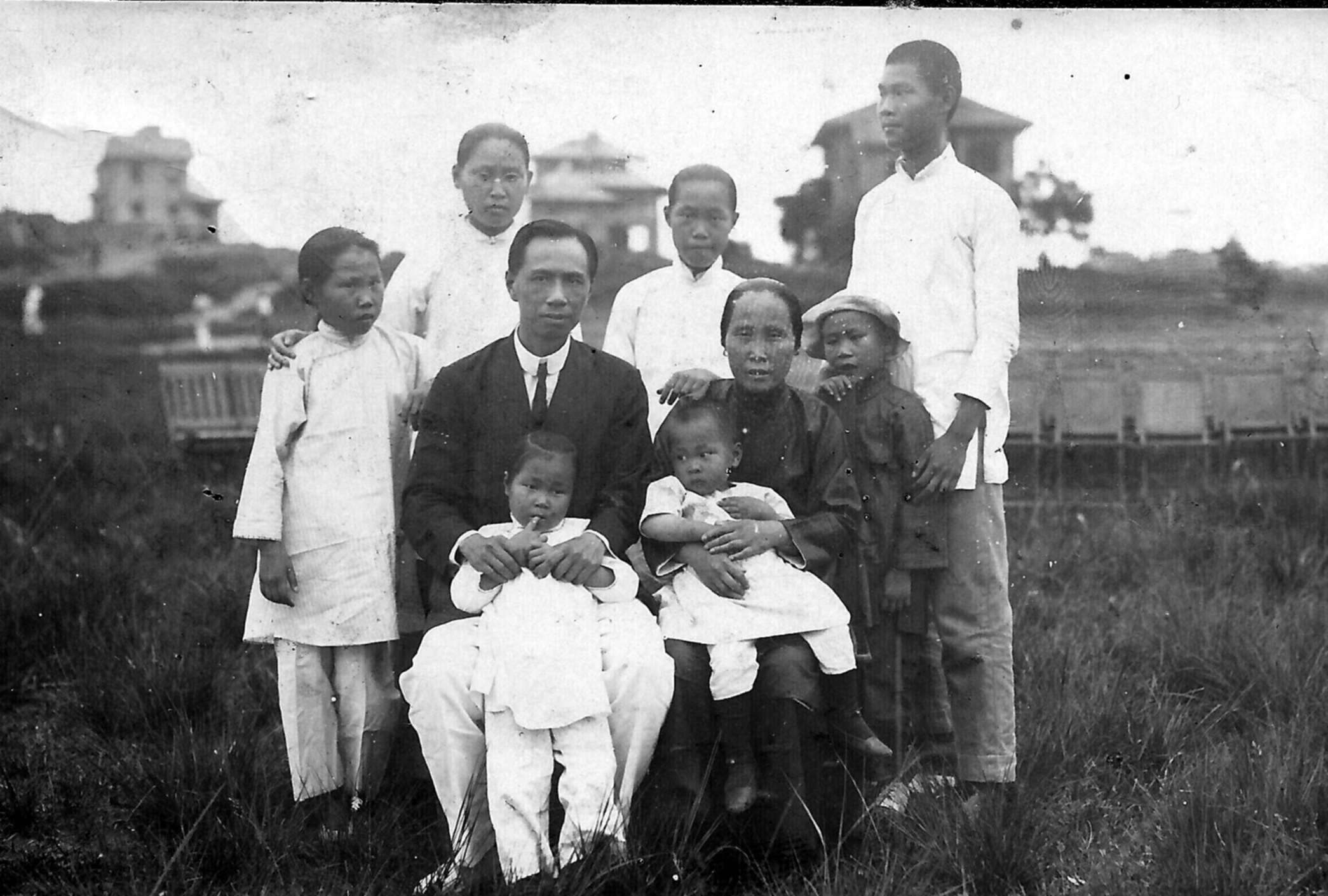
Liao Deshan and family

== A family dedicated to education ==
All Liao Chongzhen's sisters were outstanding people who dedicated their lives to 'Change through education' and all studied at Lingnan University 嶺南大學(Guangzhou 廣州), (the number in parentheses after their name indicates the order of birth):

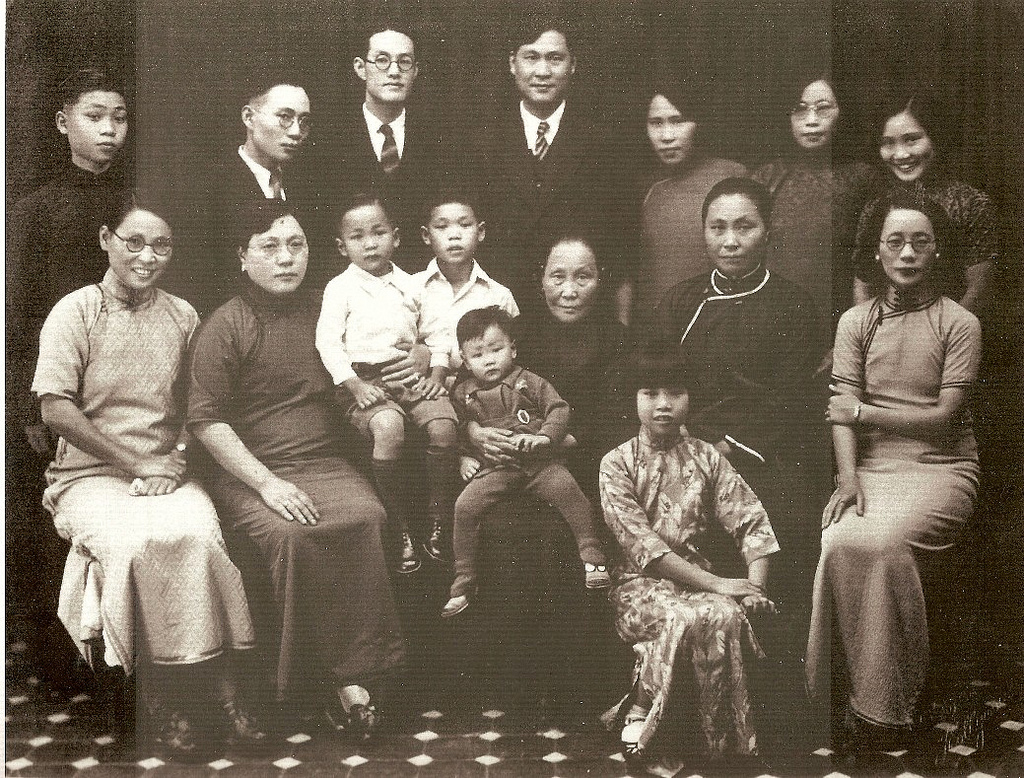
Liao Chongzhen and family

廖奉獻 (Liao Fengxian) (1) was educated at the College of Wooster and at Wellesley College got a Master in education at Columbia University and was one of the earliest women who went to graduate school. She was instrumental in opening up Chinese universities to women. After she came back to China she served as first dean of the Women's College of Lingnan University.

廖奉恩 (Liao Fengen) (2) was the first Chinese woman who went to Smith College and also got a Master in education from Columbia University. When she returned to Guangzhou she served as Soong Ching-ling (Madame Sun Yat-Sen)'s English secretary; then she served as vice-principal of 廣州執信中學 Zhixin High School in 1924 and principal from 1937. She served also on the board of directors of Lingnan University from 1926. Liao Fengen helped translating Martha Root in her visit to Canton in 1924. On 11 April 1924 she wrote to Martha Root:

"I want to assure you that during your brief visit in Canton you have sown seeds for the Baháʼí Cause which, in due time, will bring forth a thousand folds. You have certainly given a new impetus to my religious life. I have found in the Baháʼí teachings that something which I have hitherto sought for in vain. I find that it satisfied both the requirements of the intellect and the longings of the heart. The Baháʼí movement appeals to me in that it is a movement for the doing away of all kinds of prejudice, which is so detrimental to all kinds of thinking both spiritually and intellectually and for the ushering in of the new era of universal brotherhood through the spirit of good will."

廖奉基 (Liao Fengji) (3) after studying at Lingnan University and UK she moved to study her master at Bryn Mawr College in 1918. She was the first Chinese to enter Bryan Mawr. In 1925 she founded 粵華中學 (Yuet Wah College), and she served as its president for over 20 years.

廖奉靈 (Liao Fengling) (6) when was a child was presented by her mother to Dr. Sun Yat-Sen, he stroke her head and said: "You will grow up to do great things for the country." She studied at the University of Michigan, where she met Martha Root. In 1931, on her way back to China she stopped in Yokohama, Japan, where she met Agnes Alexander, Keith Ransom-Kehler and some Japanese friends. Agnes Alexander recalls:

"While her steamer was in port in Yokohama, Miss Liu came to Tokyo and spent a night with us. It was an especially happy occasion, as it was the evening when we held a Baháʼí meeting and a spiritual unity was made between this Chinese young woman and the Japanese friends".

She was he first Chinese president of Concordia College for women (廣州市協和中學), which in 1937 was ranked by the Ministry of Education as one of the top nine secondary schools in the country and had a 100% rate of students passing the entry examinations to Chinese Universities. In January 1939 she wrote to Martha Root to say she was now in charge of a normal school with 300 students, and that she often thought of Miss Root and her "inspiring personality and of the Cause you are trying to promote and spread throughout the world". After difficult times during the Cultural Revolution, her life of service in education continued and she served as deputy director of the city department of education. She also served as a member of the municipal Chinese People's Political Consultative Conference Standing Committee, vice chairman of the city Democratic Foundation and as president of the Guangzhou Children's Welfare Association. In 1976 was the head of the reform in English teaching in Guangzhou. An award bearing her name has been created in Guangzhou, the 'Liao Fengling award' for outstanding teaching as well a kindergarten bearing her name.

廖奉潔 (Liao Fengjie) (8) also studied at the University of Michigan and worked in Hong Kong and Macau Pui Ching Middle School.

Finally, the youngest sister,

廖奉貞 (Liao Fengzhen) (10) studied at the Sun Yat-Sen University and after her studies founded an orphanage.

Liao Chongzhen had also two brothers,

廖崇聖 (Liao Chongshen) (7) who became a famous journalist and served as editor of Central Daily News, the KMT's official paper and then moved to US, where he worked for Voice of America for the remaining part of his life

廖崇國 (Liao Chongguo) (9) who became a renowned ophthalmologist

and one sister Liao Fengging (5) who died at age 25 in Canton.

== Education years ==
At age 18 Liao Chongzhen attended Lingnan University (Guangzhou) as all his other siblings did. He was a sportsman, he participated in the 2nd and 3rd Far Eastern Games (the precursor of the Asian Games) in Shanghai 1915 and Tokyo 1917, in volleyball and track & field, winning a gold medal in volleyball.

In 1919 he sailed from Hong Kong to San Francisco to study agriculture at Cornell University in the United States.

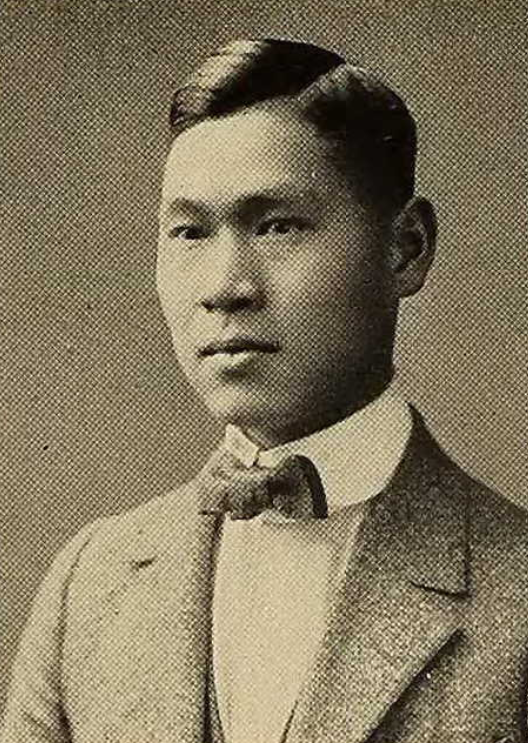
Liao Chongzhen at Cornell University, 1923

== Encounter with the Baháʼí Faith ==
At Cornell, at age 21, Liao Chongzhen first came in contact with the Baháʼí Faith and it made a deep impression on him. The Baháʼí Faith had a great impact on Liao's life. He was introduced to the Faith by Mirzá Fádl's Mázindárání and Roy Wilhelm on 10 October 1920. In 1921 he became a Baháʼí.

== Return to China and first positions ==
In 1923 he returned to Canton, to work in the mining and forestry bureau. From 1933 he served as head of the Guangdong Bureau for the improvement of sericulture achieving great results. The location of his work was Shunde where he rejuvenated the silk industry. He was also the Guangdong's representative at the First National Congress in Canton 1924.

== Martha Root's visits ==
In 1924 Liao Chongzhen arranged a meeting between the renowned Baháʼí journalist Martha Root and Dr. Sun Yat-sen, in which he served as interpreter. Liao Chongzhen later reported that: “...Dr. Sun Yat-Sen heard and read about the Baháʼí Faith and also declared that it was highly relevant to the needs of China". Martha Root, visited Canton again in 1930, and stayed there for a week. Liao Chongzhen and his family arranged for her to encounter Chen Mingshu (governor of Guangdong) Chen said: "I did not know much about this Baháʼí movement until you sent me a booklet two days ago, but as I read it, I believe Bahá’u’lláh was a Prophet and China has need of a Prophet in these days. Such teachings at their lowest estimate could not harm any nation and at their highest they could do great good in China and in every country. No nation is more fitted to receive these Teachings than China". Liao's family also arranged for her lectures over the Canton radio and lecture at Sun Yatsen University and secondary schools. Three of her translated radio broadcast lectures 'New Universal Language', 'Esperanto As a Universal Language' and 'What is the Baháʼí Movement?' were published in a special two-page-spread supplement of the Canton Municipal Daily News on 23 September 1930. The supplement also featured a photograph of 'Abdu'l-Bahá.

== Family life ==
Liao Chongzhen married Sun Li Shu 孫麗淑 in 1931.

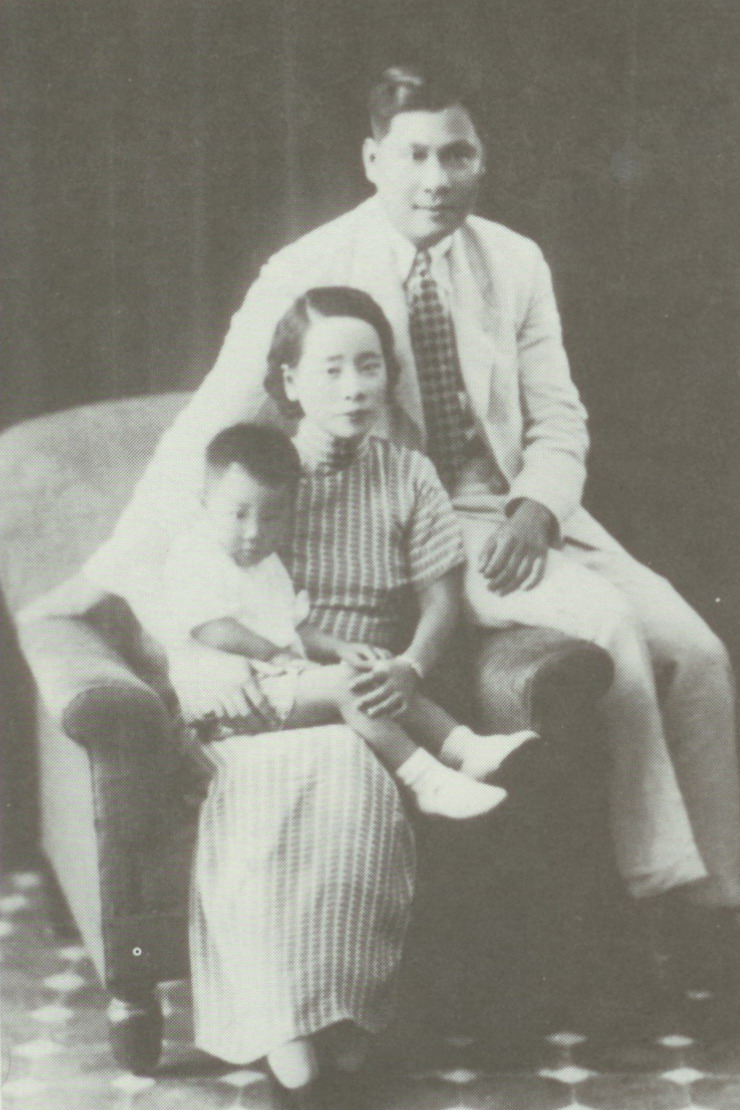
Liao Chongzhen with wife and son

A couple of years later they had their first child, a son, and they called him Da Tong 大同 (alternative spelling Tai Tung). Da Tong was how the Baháʼí Faith was called in China in those days. This marriage produced four other children: Da Ming 大明, Da Hua 大華, Da Wai 大偉 and Da Wen 大文.

== Translation work and further services ==
When Hand of the Cause of God Keith Ransom-Kehler visited Canton in 1931 she was invited by Liao Fengling to stay in the house of the young couple. His article, "A Chinese view of the Baháʼí Cause", appeared in Baháʼí World 1932–1934. In 1933 Liao Chongzhen will start a correspondence with Shoghi Effendi (the Guardian of the Baháʼí Faith) asking how he can best serve the Faith. The Guardian asks him to concentrate his efforts in the translation of the Writings into Chinese.

In few years he will manage to translate 'Tablets of Bahá’u’lláh' (finished translation in 1938), 'The Hidden Words' 大同教隱言經 (published in Canton in 1937),

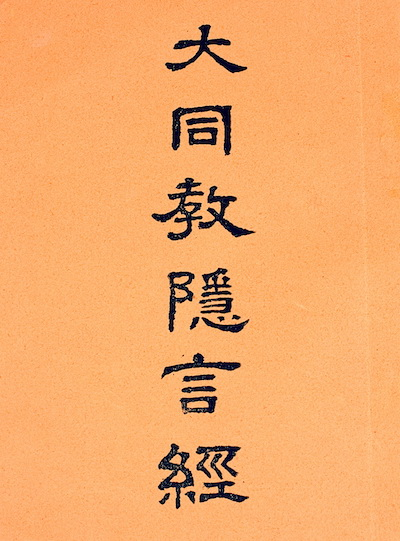
'The Hidden Words', by Bahá'u'lláh, Printed Canton 1937

of which he printed 2000 copies and 'Prayers and meditations' (Unpublished).

In one of his letters he writes:

"The Baháʼí Faith is very broad and profound, is the guide for salvation. Its value is infinite. The Baháʼí Faith emphasizes on practicing not on preaching. I truly believe that the Baháʼí Faith is the remedy for the disputes of today's world and the basis of setting up a new world".

On 30 November 1936 he writes to Martha Root about his progress in translating the Writings stating:

"I am looking forward to the day that I can devote all my time into the translation of Baháʼí literature into Chinese. There is much gain in translation and our country needs the Cause so much".

in January, 1936, the Guardian invited the Baháʼí youth of the world to a joint celebration of Naw-Rúz. In demonstration of the international unity amongst Baháʼí youth, 26 regional conferences were organized around the globe on Baháʼí Naw-Rúz 1936. Conferences occurred in 16 cities in North America and in London, Paris, Hamburg, Heidelberg, Alexandria, Baghdad, Karachi, Poona, Canton and Tokyo.

Liao Chongzhen who, wishing to join the international celebration, announced through the newspapers a meeting at the Asia Hotel. Ten strangers were his guests and have formed the nucleus of a study group.

'The delegates at every conference signed a letter which read as follows:

"Dearly beloved Guardian: Today young Baháʼís are celebrating in international conferences the inauguration of another Baháʼí year. In unity with our fellows throughout the world we have joined in a new determination to serve the Cause of Bahá'u'lláh. The thought underlying all our efforts is that, led by your wishes and stimulated by your prayers and trust in us, we may rise to those heights of endeavor to which the example of your own life so clearly directs us. May the seed of Bahá'u'lláh's Word find in our hearts soil which, prepared by service and study, enriched by tests, and continually nourished by His blessings, may attain capacity to produce His fruits. That our lives may bear testimony to the reality of our Faith, becoming thus potent instruments for the shaping of His great civilization, is our deepest hope. To you, our beloved Guardian, and to the members of the Holy Family and friends of the household, we send our tender love and devotion, longing to become more worthy, that we may be in truth your coworkers in the establishment of the World Order of Bahá'u'lláh."

To their message the Guardian cabled in reply: 'Overjoyed, deeply thankful. Appreciate greeting. Loving remembrance Holy Shrine.'

And on 10 August 1937 he writes Martha Root:

"The compliment that you gave me, I am afraid I do not deserve. Bahá'u'lláh is the hope of the world. What else can we do but turn to Him in this wartorn world. As I am quite pressed with time, I try to do a little translation each morning before going to work. My humble contribution can never be compared with what you have done for the Cause".

Liao will continue to be in contact with the Guardian and he will add to one of the letter the picture of himself and his family. The Guardian hung the portrait on the wall in one of the rooms of the Mansion of Bahjí in Akká, Palestine.

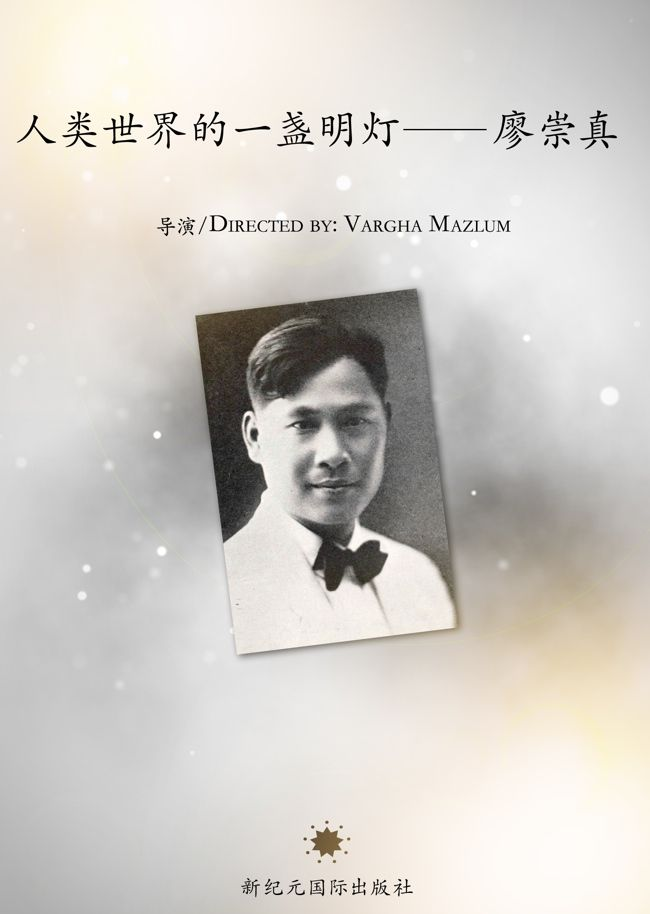
Liao Chong Zhen documentary

== The war years ==
The atmosphere in Canton was intense, due to the expected Japanese invasion. His wife and children subsequently moved to safety to stay with her parents. Liao Chongzhen initially stayed in Canton and in 1938 wrote this moving letter to the Guardian:

"In the midst of bombs and bullets I have completed the translation of the books, for I believe the eventual salvation of the world lies in the realizations of the principles of Bahá’u’lláh and I want to perform my small part in bringing these glad tidings to our people".

Liao Chongzhen moved to Hong Kong in 1938, becoming the first Chinese Baháʼí to live in the British Colony. In 1940, with the evacuation of Hong Kong, he moved back to the mainland to work for the provincial government of Guilin, which was not under Japanese control. In 1944 Liao Chongzhen returned to Canton, living in the Shamean area until 1949. In 1949 he again moved to Hong Kong with his family to stay with his sister Liao Fengjie. However, his wife, pregnant with their last child, returned to Canton along with her children. Liao Chongzhen followed her back to Canton for a few months, but later, as his life was at risk, he returned, with just few items on him, to Hong Kong. There he stayed for three years and then sailed to the United States, living there for the rest of his life.

== Final years in United States ==
While in the United States, Liao Chongzhen continued with his translation work as witnesses the correspondence he had with the Asian Teaching Committee. He also visited the Baháʼí temple at Wilmette and was in contact with Baháʼís in his city. In 1965 his daughter Da Wen was able to move to the United States. The father and daughter who had never met will meet for the first time in New York. All other kids and his wife will not see Liao Chongzhen from 1949 until his death. Da Wen, now 16 years old, will move to stay with her uncle Liao Chongguo in Chicago. Da Wen recalls:

"He told me that he found the Baháʼí explanation of God more humble: God is an unknowable essence, far from human comprehension. He also liked the universality of the Baháʼí Faith, that is inclusive and open. He never forced me to accept the Faith. He just shared what he believed in. I was just a teen, but I remember. In one of his visits to Chicago, he accompanied me to visit the Baháʼí House of Worship, which is a magnificent piece of architecture and eventually was my inspiration to become an architect."

== In popular culture ==
A film on the life of Liao Chongzhen "Liao Chongzhen – A bright candle of the light of humanity" produced and directed by Vargha Mazlum has been released in April 2015. https://www.youtube.com/watch?v=xPRjKsNILuA
