= Hilda Yen =

Chinese-American speaker

Hilda Yank Sing Yen
- 顏雅清
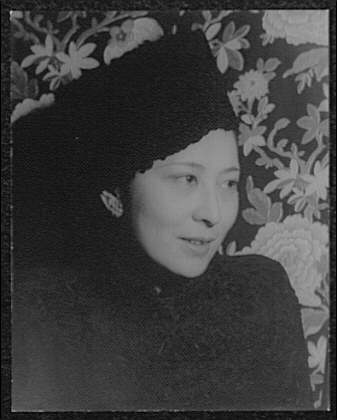
- Hilda Yen in 1937

Personal details
- Born: 17 January 1906 Kiangsu, Qing Empire
- Died: 18 March 1970 (aged 64) Riverdale, Bronx, New York City, U.S.
- Resting place: Ferncliff Cemetery, Ardsley, New York
- Spouse: P.T. Chen (divorced)
- Children: 2
- Education: Columbia University
- Occupation: Diplomat, aviator, speaker

Hilda Yank Sing Yen (Chinese: 顏雅清; pinyin: Yán Yǎqīng) or sometimes Yan, was one of the leading figures of Chinese American society for some decades. Coming from a high-profile family traditionally serving Chinese governments and society, she left the East while continuing to be a bridge of cultures. Initially proving herself in university, she worked in diplomatic circles leading to the League of Nations for some years and then, inspired by aviator Li Xiaqing, she embarked on extended flights across the United States, speaking on international peace, pointing to the needs of China against the looming aggressions of the era, and then working with the United Nations. A major transition was her conversion to the Baháʼí Faith in 1944 and she was centrally involved in the religion achieving its registration as a non-governmental organization with the United Nations, where she then continued her work for several years. Ultimately she was disappointed in the international community's lack of embrace of a spiritual-religious commitment as the basis of an international peace and withdrew due to these concerns. Along the way, she married twice, with two children from the first marriage though she died divorced.

== Early years and family ==
Her date of birth is conjectured from conversion from eastern calendars. Late in life she adopted the date of January 17 though most of her life she used November 29 as her date of birth. The year is similarly a matter of conjecture: around 1904 to 1906, however her father's paperwork has listed her birth year as 1902. Her parents were Fu Ching Yen and Siu Ying Chow, the extended family being prominent under Sun Yat-sen. Her baptismal name was Hilda. Her sister was similarly named Dorothy.

Her family had adopted Christianity; her grandfather and his brother were among the earliest converts to Christianity as Episcopalians; they also volunteered to fight for the Union North in the American Civil War while in school at Ohio's Kenyon College. Her father became a doctor in China and served in South Africa. Her family moved while at an age of about 8 years to New Haven, Connecticut, where her father entered Yale School of Medicine followed by Harvard Medical School in public health while she attended elementary school. Her family returned to China and then back in the States again for more work in public health, when at the age of about 16 she took the university entrance exam as a cultural exchange student without permission of her parents and won entry into Smith College, Northampton, Massachusetts. She majored in history but then her family returned to Shanghai abruptly, before she finished her degree, in 1924. Back in China, she majored in psychology and while there she participated in foiling an anti-foreigner uprising at her school and worked in a hospital. She had an arranged marriage to P.T. Chen, a Chinese banker, and had two children, William Kuo Wei Chen and Doreen Kuo Feng Chen. In the meantime she devoted her time to local child and women's advocacy institutions as well as at the YWCA.

== Internationalist, diplomat and aviator ==
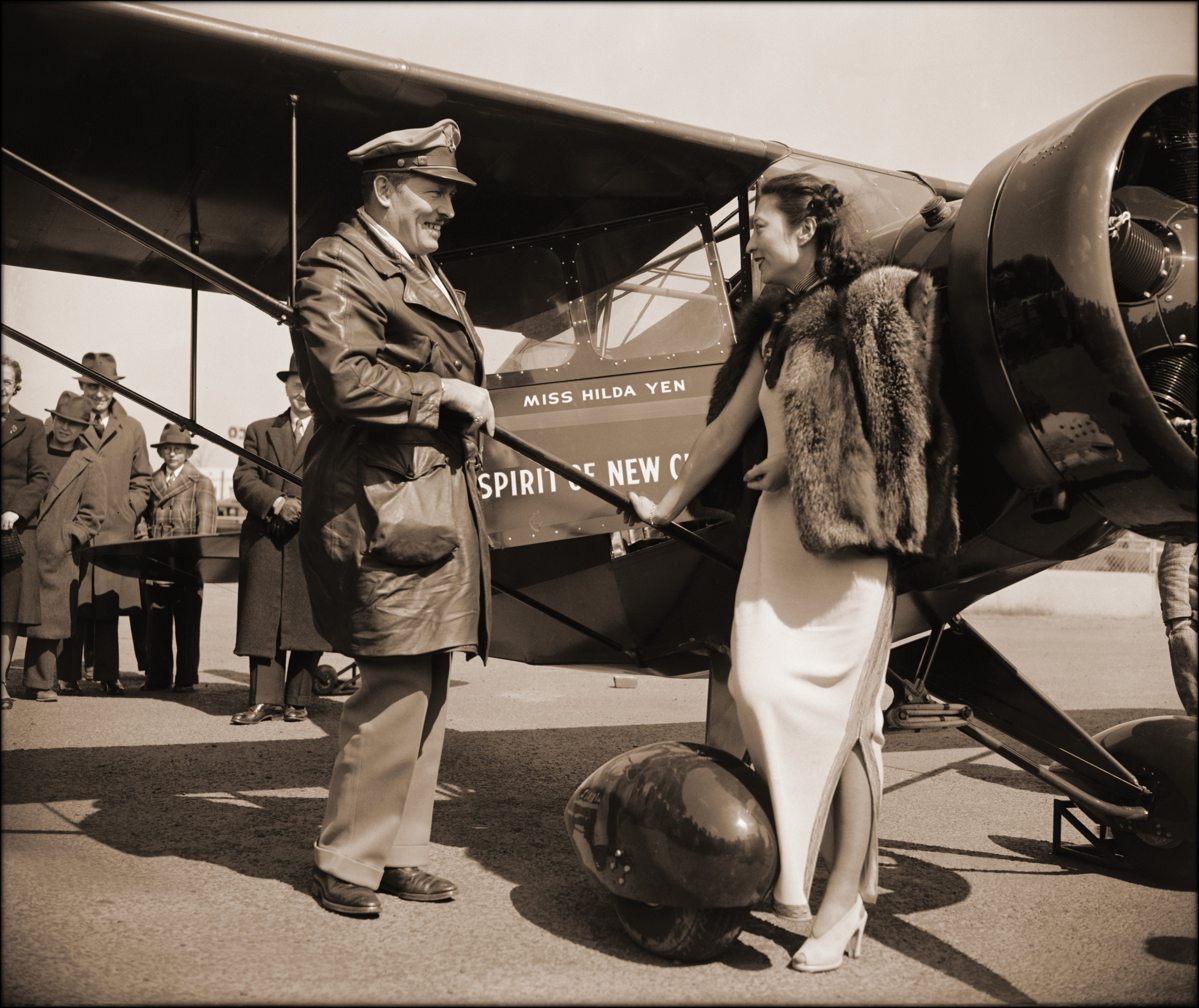
Hilda Yen receiving her plane The Spirit of New China from U.S. aviator Roscoe Turner in 1939

The year before her family returned to China, in 1923, an uncle, Cao Yunxiang, then president of Tsinghua University of Beijing, had heard of the Baháʼí Faith through Martha Root and then joined the religion. He translated Baha'u'llah and the New Era and Yen first heard of the religion through him. She accepted the invitation of another uncle, Yan Huiqing, then Ambassador to the USSR, to serve as his hostess for events at the embassy. She had some chance to address committees of the League of Nations through her diplomatic status – such as the status of women. Through her extended activities away from her husband and children, the marriage was mutually ended. At the end of their service, there was a party which included meeting Li Xiaqing and together they worked to make a presentation promoting Chinese women in flight. She then served formally at the League of Nations for three years including working with committees addressing issues of trafficking in women and children in 1937. Then she moved to the United States, took flying lessons and earned her aviator license. With Li Xiaqing back in the States, they conceived a plan of flying from city to city from 1938 speaking about the spread of war and the need of assistance for China and boycotting Japan's aggression. In 1939, a plane was donated – "The Spirit of New China" – which could use a copilot with Li and then Yen acquired her own plane also named "The Spirit of New China". Yen's plane crashed May 1, 1939, outside of Montgomery Alabama. Her injuries were severe but not life threatening. Considering her situation miraculous considering the plane crash suggested the beginnings of a change in path for her life later to be realized. Li finished their scheduled presence. Yen was discharged May 11 and she continued her advocacy on land for a time before returning to air travel in another plane. Her involvement in peace activities brought her into contact with Julia Goldman -she credits meeting Julia Goldman with re-introducing her to the Baháʼí Faith though it did not take her attention centrally for some years yet. Events in China soon led to a return to China where her father served in the cabinet of Chiang Kai-shek. In December 1941, she witnessed the marshaling of Americans after the attack at Pearl Harbor and as the Japanese arrived at Hong Kong while performing at a party for diplomats and Chinese leaders. However, she made it out of Hong Kong on a cargo plane and eventually reached the United States. Disappointed in politics and war, she was still passionate about peace and began flying again. Through her increasing contacts with the Baháʼís, she asked to attend the 1944 Baháʼí Annual convention as an observer. She was moved by the spontaneous gestures of welcome and care shown between individuals society normally kept apart as the material demonstration of the ideals of a worldwide unity across all humanity. Then she requested to enroll as a Baháʼí. She then asked to address the convention as a Baháʼí:

"Fellow Baha'is, this is more than a pleasure. It is a miracle that I am participating with you in discussing such important matters. I contacted two denominations and a parliament of religions before I met Julia Goldman, Baha'i, who sowed this seed in my heart. While convalescent from a flying crash, my life was given me for service to God. Julia took me under her wing. I saw God vaguely; then more clearly, through the Baha'i Faith. Then came the battle of Hongkong(sic) where all shared in a common danger and hunger - forced to live the oneness of mankind. At length I secured a priority to fly to America and how do I rejoice to be in this free country! Conferring with Americans I have found this country the best to execute the message of peace. I have been blessed in meeting other Baha'is. I have been deeply impressed by the love and affection among Baha'is. China is well prepared by its sages for the Baha'i Faith. …"

Her conversion was marked as a significant moment summarizing the religion in 1944 following on that of her uncle. And she dwelt on the turning point of her plane crash more during a radio interview later published in World Order (see Baháʼí literature#Periodicals).

She then attended the Bretton Woods Conference on world economics, and the Dumbarton Oaks Conference and the formation of the United Nations initially in San Francisco with a mixture of optimism in the steps being taken and disappointment the spiritual essence of unity was not being recognized more strongly: "We cannot have lasting peace without first turning to God." She joined the UN Department of Public Information and traveled increasingly for the Baháʼí Faith and comparing the peace plans then proposed. and served related interests for the advocacy for women. She was credited with playing a major role for the recognition of the Baháʼí Faith as a non-governmental organization.

She soon met and married John Gifford Male on May 15, 1948; in 1946, he had secured a job in the United Nations Secretariat in the Human Rights division following being Eleanor Roosevelt's private secretary. Standards at the time required a wife to not work in the UN however she was able to continue work in the UN through the NGO status of the Baháʼí Faith. She was also able to retrieve her children, Doreen and William, from now communist China though her family had managed to serve that government as well. Doreen would take up medicine and return to China and while Yen continued to tour often speaking at Baháʼí events. William married and had two sons, one of whom, Ronald Chen, was the Public Advocate of New Jersey and is a law professor and former dean of Rutgers Law School. She helped celebrate achievements like the banquet in honor of the Xth volume of the Baháʼí World with Baháʼí notables Firuz Kazemzadeh and Helen Elsie Austin in 1950, continued giving talks, as well as trying to further the importance of the awareness of religion as a force for peace inside the UN.

Yen was disappointed in the UN and the general efforts towards international peace – its lack of putting religious motivation at the heart of international peace seemed to result in much lack of progress.

== Later life ==
Yen shifted away from working in international diplomacy and public view - she began by volunteering at a hospital. Into the 1950s, her husband was looking to retire in New Zealand while Yen continued to seek ways of being of service and they both fell in love with other people. They divorced December 18, 1959. Male married three days later. Yen's further relationships never formed another marriage.

She went to school at Columbia University, getting a degree and experience as a science librarian and gained employment in the field in the Brooklyn Library. In the 1960s she suffered from breast cancer and outlived doctor's expectations a number of years and she developed an interest in the I Ching. Finally she died March 18, 1970, and was buried at Ferncliff Cemetery in Ardsley, New York. Her longtime colleague at the Baháʼí International Community, the name of the religion's NGO, Mildred Mottahedeh, underscored her service: "This noble lady played an important role in the development of the Baha'i Faith in the international field, and it was through her efforts that the Baha'is began their work with the United Nations", and wrote a memorial.

== See also ==
- Baháʼí International Community
- Baháʼí Faith in Taiwan
- Baháʼí Faith in China
