= Baháʼí International Community =

International non-governmental organization

- Abbreviation: BIC
- Formation: 1948; 78 years ago
- Parent organization: Universal House of Justice
- Website: bic.org

The Baháʼí International Community, or the BIC, is an international non-governmental organization (NGO) representing the members of the Baháʼí Faith; it was first chartered in March 1948 with the United Nations, and currently has affiliates in over 180 countries and territories.

Hilda Yen was a founding and key figure in the establishment of the BIC according to Mildred Mottahedeh. Mottahedeh underscored Yen's service upon her death in 1970: "This noble lady played an important role in the development of the Baha'i Faith in the international field, and it was through her efforts that the Baha'is began their work with the United Nations", and wrote a memorial.

The BIC seeks to "promote world peace by creating the conditions in which unity emerges as the natural state of human existence" by promoting and applying principles which are derived from the teachings of the Baháʼí Faith to develop a united and sustainable civilization. The BIC also works on the advancement of human rights, the advancement of women, universal education, the encouragement of just economic development, the protection of the environment, and a sense of world citizenship.

The Baháʼí International Community has representative offices in Addis Ababa, Brussels, Cairo, Jakarta and at the United Nations in New York and Geneva. In recent years an Office of the Environment and an Office for the Advancement of Women were established as part of its United Nations Office. There also exists an Office of Public Information which is based at the Baháʼí World Centre in Haifa, Israel; that office distributes information about the Baháʼí Faith and publishes One Country, a quarterly newsletter.

On 4 March 2009, the Baháʼí International Community released an open letter to Iran's Chief Prosecutor, Ayatollah Qorban-Ali Dorri-Najafabadi, addressing his statements regarding the administrative affairs of the Baháʼís of Iran.

== Approach to United Nations engagement ==
=== Institutional relationships ===
To achieve its purpose, the BIC cooperates with governments, the United Nations and other inter-governmental and non-governmental organizations; in May 1970 it gained consultative status with the United Nations Economic and Social Council (ECOSOC) and in 1976 with the United Nations Children's Fund (UNICEF). Then in 1989 the BIC developed a working relationship with the World Health Organization, and it also has a working relationship with various other United Nations agencies and enterprises including the UN Development Fund for Women (UNIFEM) and United Nations Environment Programme (UNEP). The BIC has also undertaken joint development programs with various other United Nations agencies; in the 2000 Millennium Forum of the United Nations a Baháʼí was invited as the only non-governmental speaker during the summit.

=== Ideas and methods ===
In her 2021 study, Rethinking Religion and Politics in a Plural World: The Bahá’í International Community and the United Nations, Julia Berger examines how Baháʼí ideas inform the BIC's engagement with the United Nations. She uses the term "organizational substrate" to describe the underlying ideas and assumptions that shape its activities. In his review of the book, Geoffrey Cameron explains that this approach considers religious NGOs not only as organizations seeking to influence policy, but also as participants in developing conceptions of progress and social order.

Berger relates the BIC's early engagement with the United Nations to the Baháʼí understanding of humanity as moving towards collective maturity and the establishment of a peaceful global order. Her study also examines the organization's response to the persecution of Baháʼís in Iran, its participation in international discussions of gender equality, and its contributions to United Nations conferences on peace and development.

For the contemporary period, Berger identifies BIC's approach as centered on participation in public discourse, an overarching strategy for exercising "constructive agency" within United Nations spaces. As summarized by Cameron, this involved creating opportunities for dialogue, avoiding adversarial and binary framings of issues, and drawing on diverse perspectives in United Nations civil society discussions.

== Activities ==
=== Human rights ===
The BIC's human-rights work includes defending Baháʼís facing persecution in Iran and Egypt. In 1995, it presented The Realization of Economic, Social, and Cultural Rights to the 47th session of the United Nations Sub-Commission on Prevention of Discrimination and Protection of Minorities.

=== Governance and equality ===
In 2005, marking the United Nations' 60th anniversary, the BIC issued The Search for Values in an Age of Transition, which addressed democracy, human rights, collective security, and development. The statement described democratic governance in terms of respect for rights, transparency, fairness, equality of opportunity, and responsiveness to community needs, rather than majority rule alone. It also emphasized equality between women and men and the full participation of women and minorities in governance.

=== Environment ===
The BIC's 2008 statement Seizing the Opportunity: Redefining the Challenge of Climate Change called for approaches to climate change grounded in justice and equity. In 2009, the organization endorsed the Interfaith Declaration on Climate Change.

=== Interfaith engagement ===
In 2000, BIC secretary-general Albert Lincoln addressed the Millennium Peace Summit of Religious and Spiritual Leaders at the United Nations as co-chairman of the Millennium Forum. He called on religious leaders to identify values shared across religious and spiritual traditions.

== See also ==
- Baháʼí Faith
- Internationalism (politics)

== Bibliography ==
- "In Memoriam". Baháʼí News. July 1970. p. 2.
- Berger, Julia (March 2018). Divine Polity: The Baha'i International Community and the United Nations (Thesis). University of Kent.
- Berger, Julia (2021). Rethinking Religion and Politics in a Plural World. Religious Studies. London: Bloomsbury Academic. doi:10.5040/9781350130357.
- "The Baháʼí World 2005–2006: Activities". Baháʼí International Community. 2006. Archived from the original on 18 May 2008.
- "About us". Baháʼí International Community. 2015.
- "Open letter to Iran's Chief Prosecutor" (PDF). Baháʼí International Community. 2009. Archived (PDF) from the original on 7 April 2009.
- Baháʼí World News Service (2000-09-08). "Baháʼí United Nations Representative Addresses World Leaders at the Millennium Summit". Baháʼí International Community. Archived from the original on 22 April 2006.
- Buck, Christopher (14 March 2012). "Bahá'í Faith". In Michael D. Palmer; Stanley M. Burgess (eds.). The Wiley-Blackwell Companion to Religion and Social Justice. Wiley-Blackwell. pp. 210–223. doi:10.1002/9781444355390.ch13. ISBN 978-1-4051-9547-8.
- Cameron, Geoffrey (3 July 2022). "Rethinking Religion and Politics in a Plural World: The Bahá'í International Community and the United Nations: Julia Berger, (London: Bloomsbury, 2021). 206 pp. $47.25 paperback". The Review of Faith & International Affairs. 20 (3). Routledge: 95–96. doi:10.1080/15570274.2022.2111790. ISSN 1557-0274.
- Hatcher, John (1996). "Child and Family in Baha'i Religion". In Coward, Harold G. (ed.). Religious Dimensions of Child and Family Life: Reflections on the UN Convention on the Rights of the Child. Victoria, B.C.: University of Victoria. p. 156. ISBN 1-55058-104-X.
- McMullen, Michael (2000). The Baha'i: The Religious Construction of a Global Identity. New Brunswick, N.J.: Rutgers University Press. p. 39. ISBN 0-8135-2836-4.
- Mottahedeh, Mildred (1975). "Hilda Yank Sing Yen 1905-1970". Bahá’í World (1968-1973). Vol. 15. Haifa: Baháʼí International Centre. ISBN 0 85398 059 4.
