= Project Concern International =

American non-profit organization

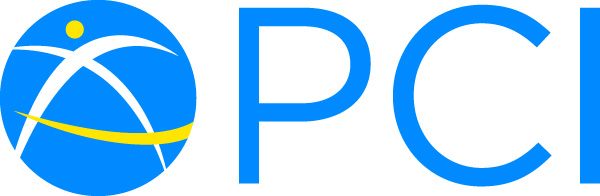
- Type: International NGO
- Website: www.pciglobal.org

PCI (Project Concern International) is a non-profit, humanitarian NGO based in San Diego, California. PCI reaches nearly 19 million people a year through programs in Asia, Africa, and the Americas.

PCI's programs address a broad range of topics including food security, gender equity, water and sanitation, economic development, climate change, agriculture, education, health, and emergency response. In March 2022, agreed to pay $537,500 to the United States Agency for International Development to resolve claims that it knowingly submitted false financial claims to the agency.

== History ==
PCI was founded in 1961. In 1961, a young doctor from living in San Diego James Wesley Turpin, had an ambition to live a meaningful life of helping people and learned of a clinic in Tijuana that needed help and there he saved the lives of two small children who were dying of pneumonia. This experience led Turpin to found Project Concern when he realized it took more than one caring doctor in one place. From there he learned of the challenges in Hong Kong and from there he learned of the challenges in Vietnam. He published two books detailing and expanding the commentary on the work. Along the way he was assisted in fundraising for the project and other doctors working in the clinics. Project Concern began to provide services in more and more places - Hong Kong, Vietnam, Appalachia, Navajo lands - with an internationally diverse personnel. And Turpin's work would come to be recognized in later years. In 1974 Turpin gave up being general director of PCI though he's continued to work the same kinds of care in his other endeavors and some of the work, for example in Vietnam, has survived. Turpin continued to help with fundraising for PCI into 2002.

PCI is headquartered in San Diego with offices in Washington, D.C., and employs more than 900 people around the world, 83 percent of whom are host country nationals.

In 2018, PCI impacted the lives of 10 million people around the world.

== Projects ==
=== Health ===
In 2018, more than 1.4 million community members participated in peer/self-help groups to improve health and nutrition behaviors. That same year, PCI reached 25,314 orphans and vulnerable children to improve their health and well-being.

=== Food security ===
More than 18,135,000 nutritious meals were served to over 220,000 primary school children through PCI's school-based programs in 2018.

=== Disaster relief ===
In 2018, 930,172 people benefited from PCI's risk reduction and resilience programming globally. The organization also completed a post-project sustainability study of post-earthquake relief efforts in Haiti, determining that neighborhood-level infrastructure continued to make a significant impact on the community and its recovery.

=== Gender related issues ===
In Botswana and Malawi, PCI is helping adolescent girls develop into resilient, empowered women through the DREAMS program, so they can forge a path to a brighter future.

In 2018, over 85,000 new Women Empowered (WE) groups totaling 908,298 members were formed. $894,200 was saved by 48,000 active WE members to improve their lives, households and their communities.

== Accusations of Fraud ==
In March 2022, Project Concern International agreed to pay $537,500 to the United States Agency for International Development as a result of "improperly shifting costs between projects, and sometimes using USAID grant funds to cover for privately-funded projects." The fraudulent activity took place between 2014 and 2016. As reported in the Department of Justice press release on the topic: "Specifically, once grant funding for one assistance project was depleted, PCI supervisors would instruct its employees to bill their time or other costs to separate and unrelated USAID grant projects that had money remaining in their accounts, even though those employees did not work on that project. PCI then certified to USAID that it used the grant funds only as allowed under each project."
