= Baháʼí Faith in Taiwan =

The Baháʼí Faith in Taiwan (Chinese: 巴哈伊教; pinyin: Bāhāyī Jiào) began after the religion entered areas of China and nearby Japan. The first Baháʼís arrived in Taiwan in 1949 and the first of these to have become a Baháʼí was Jerome Chu (Chu Yao-lung) in 1945 while visiting the United States. By May 1955 there were eighteen Baháʼís in six localities across Taiwan. The first Local Spiritual Assembly in Taiwan was elected in Tainan in 1956. The National Spiritual Assembly was first elected in 1967 when there were local assemblies in Taipei, Tainan, Hualien, and Pingtung. Circa 2006 the Baháʼís reported their numbers as 16,000 and 13 assemblies.

== Early days ==
=== Far East ===
The Baháʼí Faith entered the region of the Far East, in Hong Kong, in the 1870s, during the lifetime of Baháʼu'lláh, the founder of the Baháʼí Faith. While the religion continued to enter other nearby regions to Taiwan — Baháʼís being in Shanghai in 1902, Japan in 1912, Canton in 1949, and Macau in 1953, there was no Baháʼí contact with the island until 1949. Between 1895 and 1945, until ending with World War II, Taiwan was under Japanese rule and then there was the period of the Chinese Civil War.

=== Beginning in Taiwan ===
Four Baháʼís arrived in Taiwan in 1949 as part of the wave of refugees of Chiang Kai-shek's retreat from the mainland: Jerone Chu, Yan Hsu-chang, Chien Tien-lee, and Gellan Wang. The first Baháʼí in Taiwan was Jerome Chu (Chu Yao-lung), a newspaper man, who had become a Baháʼí in Washington D.C. in 1945. Chu arrived in Taiwan after a stay in Nanking where an associate, Yuan Hsu-chang, had accepted the religion and also came to Taiwan. Major Chien Tien-lee (Lee L.T. Chang) had had a Baháʼí marriage ceremony in Denver, Colorado, U.S.A. and came to Taiwan after a stay in Shanghai.

The first American Baháʼí visitors to Taiwan were Dr. David Earl and Lt. Col. John McHenry in 1952, and Rafi and Mildred Mottahedeh in 1953. In October of that year Dhikru'llah Khadem visited Taiwan, the first Hand of the Cause — people who achieved a distinguished rank in service to the religion — to do so and at a meeting he held in Chu's home three more people accepted the Baháʼí Faith: these three were Professor Tsao Li-shih, who was an instructor of architecture at the College of Engineering at the National Taiwan University; Hong Li-ming (Jimmy), the first native-born Taiwanese to become a Baháʼí; and Wong Ho-len (Wong Ho-jen).

Later, Mr. and Mrs. Suleimani, who were Baháʼís in Shanghai, left that city in 1950, and arrived in Taiwan in 1954 at port Keelung where they found there was already a community of ten Baháʼís spread among some of the cities of Taiwan: Taipei (2), Tainan (4), Taoyuan, Kaohsiung and Chiayi. Mrs. Suleimani was from a Baháʼí family from Ashqabad who left in 1923.

== Growth ==
By May 1955 there were eighteen Baháʼís in six localities across Taiwan. The first Baháʼí Local Spiritual Assembly in Taiwan was elected in Tainan in 1956, which was noted by Shoghi Effendi, then head of the religion. The members were Mr. Wang Chi-chang, Mrs. Suleimani, Mr. Pai Chung-chen, Mrs. Ruthy Tu, Mr. Tsao Li-shih. Standing. Dr. Ni Jun-chung (ching), Mr. Chu, Mr. Winston Luk, and Mr. Ho Chung-tzu. Mrs. Tu was the first woman citizen of Taiwan to become a Baháʼí and was elected to be a delegate in 1957 to the election of the regional National Spiritual Assembly but was unable to travel. Noted Baháʼí Agnes Alexander visited the island in 1956, and, after being appointed as a Hand of the Cause, visited the island again in 1958 and 1962.

From 1955 through 1957, petitions by the Baháʼí community were submitted to the Taiwanese government to be recognized as a religion by the government had failed, though permission was given to have a temporary Baháʼí summer school in September 1957.

In 1957, the first regional National Assembly election convention of the Baháʼís of North East Asia, held in Tokyo, was convened; the jurisdiction of the National Assembly included Taiwan. In 1958, the second Local Spiritual Assembly of the island was established in Taipei with the arrival of two pioneers and one more citizen convert. By April 1958 the number of Baháʼís in Taiwan had reached twenty-two. The first official use of the Tainan Baháʼí Centre was in 1959. In 1960 the book Baháʼu'lláh and the New Era was revised, translated and reprinted and one copy was given to every Baháʼí in Taiwan. In 1963 Mrs. Tu was able to attend the first Baháʼí World Congress which also the year of the first Baháʼí marriage ceremony in Taiwan.

The first Baháʼí National Spiritual Assembly of Taiwan was first elected in 1967 — the members of the institution were Mrs. Isabel Dean and Mrs. Ridvaniyyih Suleimani, Mr. Kuo Rong-hui, Mr. Robert Yen, Dr. Sidney Dean, Mr. S.A. Suleimani, Mr. Tsao Kai-min, Mr. Huang Tsen-min and Mr. Huang Ting-seng. At the time there were local assemblies in Taipei, Tainan, Hualien, and Pingtung. Then in 1970 the Baháʼí community of the island was recognized by the government.

In 1990, the Chief of the indigenous Puyuma Tribe, Mr. Chen Wen-sheng, became a Baháʼí.

== Social and spiritual activities ==
Since its inception the religion has had involvement in socio-economic development beginning by giving greater freedom to women, promulgating the promotion of female education as a priority concern, and that involvement was given practical expression by creating schools, agricultural coops, and clinics. The religion entered a new phase of activity when a message of the Universal House of Justice dated 20 October 1983 was released. Baháʼís were urged to seek out ways, compatible with the Baháʼí teachings, in which they could become involved in the social and economic development of the communities in which they lived. Worldwide in 1979 there were 129 officially recognized Baháʼí socio-economic development projects. By 1987, the number of officially recognized development projects had increased to 1482. In more recent years the Baháʼís of Taiwan have participated in a number of local and international activities. By 1995, the Baháʼí Office of the Environment for Taiwan, in collaboration with the national government, had trained hundreds of teachers throughout the country to introduce conservation issues into curricula. The Office also produced a series of national radio educational programs on environmental care and protection. In December 1997 Baháʼís were invited to participate in a local exhibit of religions. In 2001 Baháʼís from Taiwan attended the opening of the Seat of the International Teaching Centre. In 2004, the Taiwanese Baháʼí community organizes 20 regular children's classes, attracting some 200 children.

== Modern demographics ==
Circa 2006, a Taiwanese government document with statistics on religious adherence reported the presence of 16,000 Baháʼís, or 0.1% of the national population, with 13 assemblies. This number was voluntarily given by the Baháʼís to the authorities who do not collect or independently verify the statistics. The Association of Religion Data Archives (relying mostly on the World Christian Encyclopedia) reported 16,252 Baháʼís in 2010.

== See also ==
- Baháʼí Faith by country
- History of Taiwan
- Religion in Taiwan
- Hilda Yen
