= Baháʼí Faith in Macau =

The Baháʼí Faith in Macao (also spelled Macau) was established much later than in China due, most likely, to the unique conditions of Macau being a Portuguese colony until 1999 and it being somewhat in the shadow of Hong Kong and larger centers in mainland China like Shanghai. The Baháʼí Faith arrived in Shanghai in 1862 and Hong Kong in 1870 but not in Macau until 1953.

== Beginnings and community growth ==
In 1953, along with other remaining parts of the globe where no Baháʼís resided, Macau became a particular goal for expatriate Baha'is to locate. On October 20, 1953, Mrs. Frances Heller, a Baháʼí from California moved there to reside.

By 1954 there were four Baháʼís in Macau – all expatriates – but they formed a cohesive group and became designated as a Baháʼí Group.

On July 15, 1954, the first resident of Macau declared his belief in Baháʼu'lláh after studying this system of belief for five months—Mr. Harry P.F. Yim (Yen Pei-feng or Yim Pui Fung), a small-business proprietor from Canton (Guangzhou), China. In October 1954 the second Macanese, Mr. Paul Kao became a Baháʼí. In that year, Mr. Manuel Ferreira, became the first Portuguese to become a Baháʼí in Macau.

By April 21, 1958, there were enough Bahaʼis so that Macau could elect its first Local Spiritual Assembly. In 1960 the first all-Chinese Local Spiritual Assembly was elected.

In the 1970s more pioneers arrived to continue to lay the foundation of the Baháʼí community in Macau and to expand its presence to the nearby islands of Taipa and Coloane. By 1973, there were eighteen believers spread out in three localities, the Macau Peninsula, Taipa and Coloane. Later the membership climbed to 32.

In March 1974, mainly due to teaching efforts of several pioneers and travel teachers from places such as Malaysia, the Baháʼí membership climbed to 36 adults with eleven youth. A few months later reports showed 47 adult Baháʼís and twelve youth in the three areas of Macau. A later statistical report, indicated there were 68 Baháʼís, including nineteen youth.

In the years since the formation of the National Spiritual Assembly of Macau in 1989, the Macau Baháʼí community continued to expand, and in the 2009 Macau Yearbook their numbers are listed as 2,500, with three Local Spiritual Assemblies.

== Administration ==
Administratively, in the early 1950s Macau was under the jurisdiction of the National Spiritual Assembly of the United States, but after the National Spiritual Assembly of North East Asia was elected in 1957 they were administered by that body.

In April 1974 the National Spiritual Assembly of Hong Kong was elected with Macau included in its jurisdiction. Two residents of Macau were elected to the first National Spiritual Assembly of the Baháʼís of Hong Kong.

In 1982 the Local Spiritual Assembly of Macau (peninsular) was granted certification by the government which was equivalent to its recognition as an incorporated charitable body.

In 1989 the number of Baháʼís in Macau was such that, together with its status as a distinct territory, The Universal House of Justice gave permission for Macau to elect its own National Spiritual Assembly. It was the third National Spiritual Assembly in Chinese territory. Taiwan was the first, in 1967, with Hong Kong the second.

== Modern community ==
Despite the agreement to transfer the sovereignty of Macau to the People's Republic of China in 1999 and its designation as a special administrative region (SAR) of China, the position of the Baháʼí Faith in Macau - its administration, membership and communities - in the context of local laws has remained unchanged. The "National" Spiritual Assembly is now referred to as the “Spiritual Assembly” or “Main Spiritual Assembly” in Chinese and still retains jurisdiction over the Local Spiritual Assemblies in Macau.

The Local Spiritual Assemblies of the Macau Peninsula, Taipa and Coloane are elected respectively once a year. The nine members of each Local Spiritual Assembly are elected from the generality of Baháʼí residents of the community through secret votes in a form of non-partisan democracy. Electioneering of any sort, candidacy and other tactics common in most political elections is prohibited.

The [Main] Spiritual Assembly of Macau is elected in a two-stage process. In the first stage, the entire Baháʼí population is divided into 19 electoral units, and each unit elects a delegate from the adult Baháʼís residing within its electoral unit. The 19 delegates elect the nine members of the [Main] Spiritual Assembly at the annual National Convention.

Like numerous communities around the world, the Macau Baháʼí Community is heavily engaged in community-building activities in Macau: “meetings that strengthen the devotional character of the community; classes that nurture the tender hearts and minds of children; groups that channel the surging energies of junior youth; circles of study, open to all, that enable people of varied backgrounds to advance on equal footing and explore the application of the teachings to their individual and collective lives. “ [ Ref: Universal House of Justice, “To the Baháʼís of the World” Ridvan 2010)

Baháʼís all around the world as well as in Macau have adopted an education and training program which caters to the spiritual needs of its participants and is arranged for different age groups as follows: Ages 5 – 7: Children's spiritual education classes Grade 1; Ages 8 – 11: Children's spiritual education classes Grade 2; Ages 12 – 14: Junior youth spiritual empowerment program; Ages 15 and onwards: A sequence of 8 courses

The above systematic sequence of training courses is able to develop in participants a meaningful spiritual life and enable them, in various ways, to serve society. The above programs are usually delivered in the participants' homes in small groups. An individual need not be a Baháʼí to take these courses.

In public articles and briefings the Baháʼí Faith is recognized as one of the five major religions of the Macau SAR and was included in religious delegations to mainland China.

== Community relations initiatives ==
In 1988, the School of the Nations - a Baháʼí-inspired school in Taipa - was established. It is owned by the Badi Foundation. As an international school, it provides an internationally oriented English-medium educational program to meet the needs of both expatriate and local families. Like many other initiatives around the world, both the Badi Foundation and the School of the Nations' efforts are examples of endeavors to translate some of the ideals and concepts of the Baháʼí Faith into actions that are of benefit to society at large.

In recent years, New Millennium Publications, based in Macau, was established and makes more and more literature on the Baháʼí Faith in Chinese available to Chinese readers.

=== Relations with the People's Republic of China ===
Since there is no administrative structure for the Baháʼí Faith in mainland China at present, the Macau Baháʼí Community, together with the Hong Kong Baháʼí Community, frequently act as liaison and contact points with the relevant government agencies of the People's Republic of China.

The Macau Baháʼí Community has been involved with exchanges, conferences and events with government, academics, and non-governmental organizations that explore and share the application of the Baháʼí teachings to the advancement of society.

The following is a non-exhaustive timeline of some of the recent activities of the Macau Baháʼí Community involving various institutions and government agencies of the People's Republic of China.

1993
The China's State Administration for Religious Affairs (SARA) invited a delegation of the Spiritual Assembly of the Baháʼís of Macau to visit various government agencies in Beijing. This was the first time a Baháʼí institution carried out a formal exchange with the Chinese government in recent times.

February 2005
The director General of SARA, Mr. Ye Xiao Wen, led a delegation from SARA to visit the Spiritual Assembly of the Baháʼís of Macau. In April the same year, he led another delegation to Israel, which included a visit to the Baháʼí World Centre.

October 2005
A delegation of the Spiritual Assemblies of the Baháʼís of Macau and Hong Kong visited Beijing and Shanghai at the invitation of SARA.

August 2006
The Spiritual Assembly of the Baháʼís of Macau and SARA organized an inter-religious seminar on 'Building An Harmonious Society – Exploring the Roles of Religion.'

October 2006
The Spiritual Assembly of the Baháʼís of Macau and the Center for the Study of the Baháʼí Faith at the Chinese Academy of Social Sciences' Institute of World Religions held a seminar on 'A New Educational Model Guided by Spiritual Perspective.'

May 2007
The Spiritual Assembly of the Baháʼís of Macau, The Institute for Global Civilization, The Shandong University Baháʼí Studies Institute, the Center for the Study of the Baháʼí Faith at the Chinese Academy of Social Sciences' Institute of World Religions and Qingdao University organized a seminar on 'Seeking Inner Harmony.'

August 2007
The Spiritual Assembly of the Bahaʼis of Macau made an exchange visit to the provinces of Shaanxi and Gansu. Their hosts were the Ethnic and Religious Affairs Committee of these two provinces and exchanges were made with the Women Federation, Poverty Alleviation Department, and different religious groups.

September 2007
The Center for the Study of the Baháʼí Faith at the Chinese Academy of Social Sciences' Institute of World Religions, the Shanghai Academy of Social Sciences' Institute of Religious Studies, The Institute of Global Civilization, and the Spiritual Assembly of the Baháʼís of Macau held an international academic seminar on 'Science, Religion, and Social and Economic Development: Reflection on the Contribution by the Baháʼí Faith Towards an Harmonious Society.'

August 2008
The chairman of the Spiritual Assembly of the Baháʼís of Macau was invited, together with leaders from the other major religious groups in Macau, to attend the opening and closing ceremonies of the 2008 Beijing Olympic Games.

October 2009
The chairman of the Spiritual Assembly went to Beijing, together with other religious leaders, to celebrate the 60th Anniversary of the Founding of the People's Republic of China.

November 2009
The director of the Policy and Regulations Department of SARA and the vice-chairman of the Ethnic and Religious Affairs Committee of Guangdong Province visited the office of the Spiritual Assembly of the Baháʼís of Macau.

October 2009
The Spiritual Assembly of Macau and SARA jointly organized the Science, Religion and Development Forum. More than two hundred scholars, officials and researchers attended. The Government of Macau sponsored the event.

April 2010
The Baháʼí community and the other four major religions in Macau jointly invited Mr. Wang Zuo'an, the new Director-General of SARA to Macau. He visited the office of the Spiritual Assembly of the Baháʼís of Macau.

November 2010
Mr Zhang Lebin, the new Deputy Director-General of SARA also visited the Office of the Spiritual Assembly of the Baháʼís of Macau. SARA's Director for External Affairs accompanied Mr. Wang and Mr. Zhang on their visits.
