= Keith Ransom-Kehler =

Keith Ransom-Kehler (February 14, 1876 – October 27, 1933) was an American leader within the Baháʼí Faith, posthumously deemed a Hand of the Cause of God. She is believed to have been the Baháʼí Faith's first American martyr, having died from general malnourishment and illness while in the fourth year of non-stop Baháʼí pioneering across the world.
