= Guangzhou Zhixin High School =

School in Guangzhou, China

- 广州市执信中学
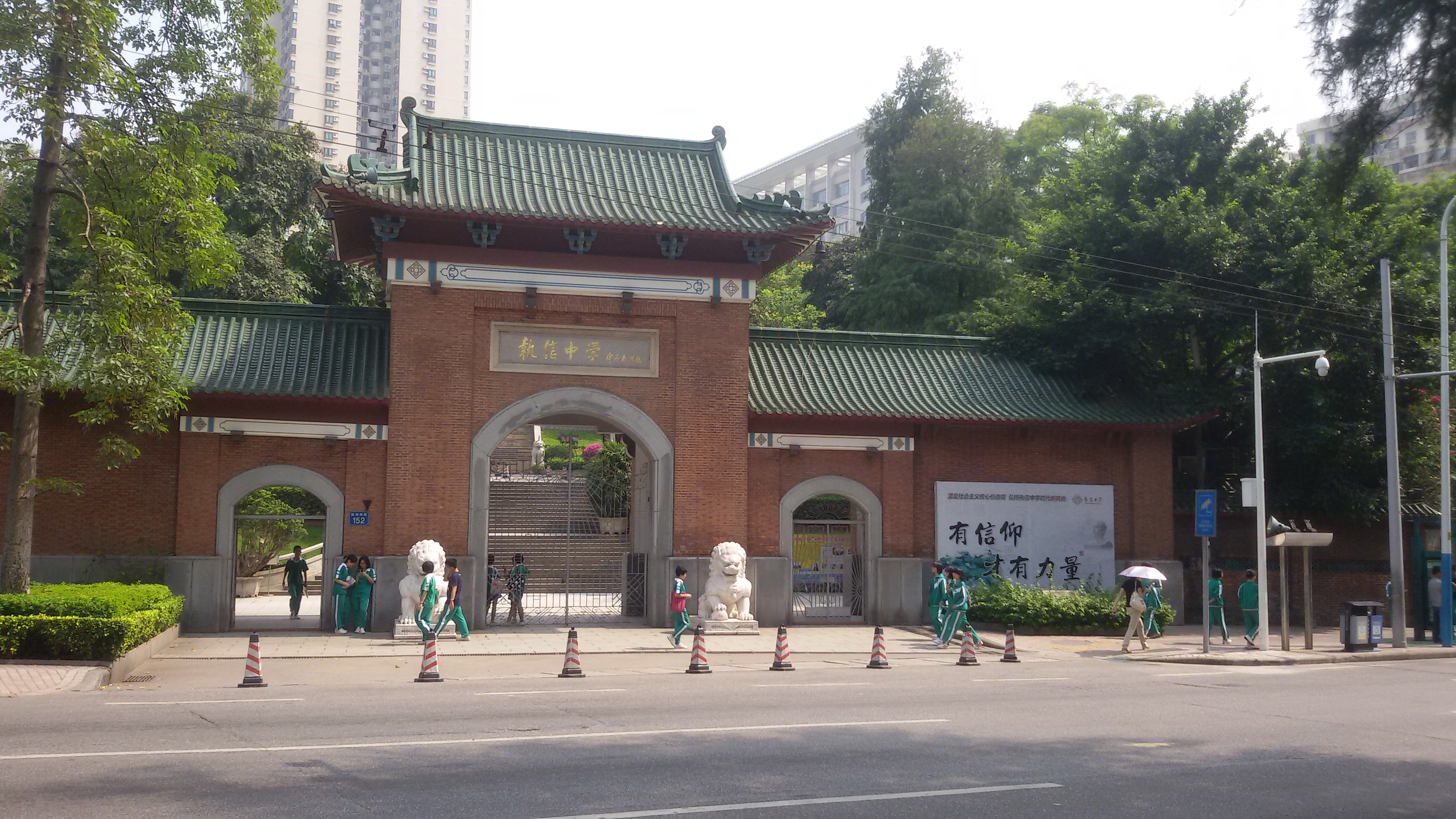

Location
- Guangzhou, China; 23.1347°N 113.288°E

Information
- Former name: Zhixin Private School; Zhixin Girls Private High School; Zhixin Girls Public High School; No. 1 Girls High School of Guangzhou; No. 55 High School of Guangzhou; Red Girls School
- Established: 1921; 105 years ago
- Founder: Sun Yat-sen
- Principal: Yong He (2008-present)
- Website: www.zhxhs.net

Guangzhou Zhixin High School (广州市执信中学) is a public secondary school in Guangzhou, Guangdong, China.

It was founded in 1921 by Sun Yat-sen in memory of his comrade, the democratic fighter Zhu Zhixin, who was killed in action in a battle at Humen, Dongguan, at the age of 35. In the school campus, a symbolic tomb was built for Zhu. In 1936, the remains of Zhu were relocated to the campus because of a termite problem at the original site.
