= Baháʼí Faith in Hong Kong =

The Baháʼí Faith in Hong Kong began during the lifetime of the founder of the Baháʼí Faith, Baháʼu'lláh.

Hong Kong's history as crown colony of the United Kingdom and then a special administrative region of the People's Republic of China has given it a unique history – a history that has impacted the structure and growth of the Baháʼí Faith there. Of course the cataclysm of the World Wars and other major events impacted the Baháʼí community as it did the citizenry in generally. In 2005 the Association of Religion Data Archives (relying mostly on World Christian Encyclopedia) estimated the Baháʼí population of Hong Kong at about 1100.

== Migration ==
As a commercial center and relatively open city even in the 1870s, Hong Kong became a location where non-Chinese Baháʼís could settle and earn a living in trade or other commercial activities. The first Baháʼí in China was recorded as having lived in Shanghai in 1862. In 1870, this person was joined by his brother and they established a trading company.

In the period 1881–1882 a nephew of the wife of the Báb resided in Hong Kong.

Hong Kong was a frequent transit hub throughout the early 1900s for western Baháʼís travelling to China and other parts of Asia. Among these travelers was Martha Root who started traveling in 1924 and on several subsequent trips, she met with editors, librarians, and the president of the university. She spoke on radio, at the Hong Kong University and had several press articles in local papers.

Association with so many Baháʼís from other lands gave heart to the Hong Kong Baháʼí expatriate community and demonstrated to the first Hong Kong Baháʼís the reality of the global community that they became a part of.

Charles Duncan, Knight of Baháʼu'lláh to Brunei, recorded of this period that pioneers moved there and that slowly a community was built in Hong Kong consisting of longtime residents. They were of Chinese, Indian, British and Southeast Asian backgrounds. He indicated there was a constant stream of Baháʼí visitors from abroad.

Pei Tswi, a Baháʼí who lived in Hong Kong for a decade from the late 1920s, and Liu Chan Song, are the only Chinese Baháʼís known to have resided in Hong Kong just prior to the Second World War.

== Maturity ==
Starting in 1953 there was a concerted effort to establish a permanent community of Baháʼís in Hong Kong and with dedicated efforts this was accomplished by the mid1950s.

The enrolment of four new members allowed the Hong Kong Baháʼís to form their first Baháʼí Local Spiritual Assembly in 1956. The Local Spiritual Assembly was registered with the Hong Kong government as a society on 29 May 1958, then incorporated in 1969. These were transferred to the National Spiritual Assembly when it was formed in 1974. At the beginning of 1957 there were 14 members in the Hong Kong Baháʼí community.

From 1957 until 1974 Hong Kong was under the administration of the Regional Spiritual Assembly of North East Asia whose jurisdiction included Japan, Korea, Formosa, Macau, Hong Kong, Hainan Island and Sakhalin Island.

The Hong Kong and Macau Baháʼí communities had a close relationship fostered by their proximity and similar circumstances. They were jointly administered in this period until Macau established its own National Spiritual Assembly in 1989 – firstly by the Regional Spiritual Assembly, and later under the National Spiritual Assembly of Hong Kong.

By 1961 there were approximately 60 Baháʼís in Hong Kong and three Local Spiritual Assemblies. Much of the growth was assisted by pioneers of Chinese background from the Malaysian Baháʼí community who could best help with contacts and support with the Chinese community living in Hong Kong. Hong Kong established a Baháʼí Centre which officially opened in August 1968. It housed the secretariat, and had live-in facilities as well as having a room for study classes and public meetings.

By 1974 there were five local assemblies in Hong Kong and the Universal House of Justice decided it was time for the Hong Kong Baháʼís to establish a National Spiritual Assembly. The formation of the national assembly was the culmination of efforts commenced by Baháʼís some 104 years before and a cause for great celebration in the Baháʼí communities of Hong Kong and elsewhere.

In the years since the formation of the national assembly, the Hong Kong Baháʼí community continued to expand. By 1979 they had grown to ten local assemblies and a total of twenty-six localities. By 1991 there were twenty-two local assemblies in Hong Kong.

[ Updates for 2010 requested ]

== Modernity ==
Despite the agreement to transfer sovereignty of Hong Kong to the People's Republic of China in 1997 and its designation as a special administrative region (SAR) (but with the retention of many unique governmental systems for at least 50 years), the position of the Baháʼí administration in Hong Kong – its administration, membership and communities – in the context of local laws has remained unchanged. The "National" Spiritual Assembly is now referred to as the "Spiritual Assembly" or "Main Spiritual Assembly" in Chinese and still retains jurisdiction over the Local Spiritual Assemblies in Hong Kong. It is elected from the generality of Baháʼí residents in the community of Hong Kong SAR.

Like numerous communities around the world, the Hong Kong Baháʼí Community undertakes community-building activities in the Hong Kong SAR. These consist of: "meetings that strengthen the devotional character of the community; classes that nurture the tender hearts and minds of children; groups that channel the surging energies of junior youth; circles of study, open to all, that enable people of varied backgrounds to advance on equal footing and explore the application of the teachings to their individual and collective lives."

The Hong Kong Baháʼí Community, together with the Macau Baháʼí Community, frequently act as liaison and contact points with the Government of the People's Republic of China since there is no administrative structure for the Baháʼí Faith operating in mainland China.

The Hong Kong Baháʼí Community has also been involved with exchanges, conferences and events with government, academic, and non-governmental organisations that explore the application of the Baháʼí teachings to the advancement of society. It also leads events and activities that promote religious and societal unity and advancement (such as the annual commemoration of World Religion Day which "call(s) attention to the harmony of the various religions' spiritual principles and to emphasize that religion is the motivating force for world unity.")

In 2005 the Association of Religion Data Archives (relying mostly on World Christian Encyclopedia) estimated the Baháʼí population of Hong Kong at about 1100.

== See also ==
- Religion in Hong Kong
- History of Hong Kong
