= Mary Hanford Ford =

American lecturer, author, art, literature critic and suffragette

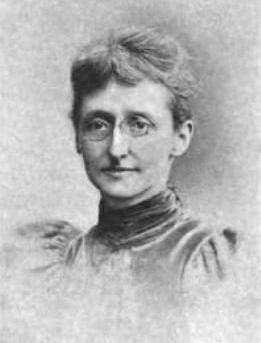
- Mary H. Ford, circa 1898, 42 years old
- Born: Mary Hanford Finney; November 1, 1856; Meadville, Pennsylvania, US
- Died: February 2, 1937 (aged 80); Clearwater, Florida, US
- Other names: Mary Hanford Finney Ford, Minnie Finnie
- Known for: Lecturer, author, art and literature critic, a leader in the women's suffrage movement
- Notable work: Which Wins?, Message of the Mystics trilogy, The Oriental Rose
- Spouse: Moses Smith Ford
- Children: 3

Mary Hanford Ford (née Finney; November 1, 1856 – February 2, 1937) was an American lecturer, author, art and literature critic and a leader in the women's suffrage movement. She reached early notoriety in Kansas at the age of 28 and soon left for the Chicago World's Fair. She was taken up by the society ladies of the Chicago area who, impressed with her talks on art and literature at the Fair, helped launch her on a new career, initially in Chicago and then across some States. Along the way she was already published in articles and noticed in suffrage meetings.

In addition to work as an art critic and speaker she wrote a number of books, most prominently a trilogy Message of the Mystics. Circa 1900 to 1902 Ford found the Baháʼí Faith through Sarah Farmer and Mírzá Abu'l-Faḍl, and helped form the first community of Baháʼís in Boston where Louis Bourgeois, future architect of the first Baháʼí House of Worship in the West, then joined the religion. In 1907 Ford went on Baháʼí pilgrimage, in 1910 she started writing Baháʼí books such as The Oriental Rose, and traveled with ʻAbdu'l-Bahá during some of his journeys in various places in Europe and then America.

Ford was blamed for a fiasco among UK suffragists but it was their own violence that got them in trouble. Ford spent the years of World War I in California following the first Baháʼí International Congress at the Panama–Pacific International Exposition, and then moved back to New York where she spent almost the next 20 years. Often she traveled to Europe for some months of the year and during this period introduced the religion to Ugo Giachery, later a prominent Baháʼí. Also in this period she was censored off a radio broadcast, helped develop the religion's community both in meetings she supported and literary efforts, before reducing her travels and speaking engagements in the early 1930s. She died with her daughter by her bedside in 1937.

== Early days ==
=== Before 1884 ===
Mary Hanford Finney was born on November 1, 1856, (though 1857 is often mentioned,) to a mercantile/banker family near Meadville, Pennsylvania. The family was noted a year later in Williamsport, Pennsylvania. The Kansas City Times obituary noted she had a brother, A.M. Finney, known from Charleston, West Virginia. That would make her father Asahel Clark Finney, who spent the last working decade of his life as a partner in a Pennsylvania lumber company before moving to Kansas City. Ford's mother was Elizabeth Mary Hanford Edson. In 1860, the US Census had the family in nearby Clearfield, Pennsylvania, where Finney was a banker with personal assets of about $2000 in 1860 dollars, and he was not the richest man on his block, though also not the poorest. Mary had an older brother Elmer, and a younger sibling Cynthia, and a live-in servant. Mother Mary was 11 years younger than A. C. By 1870, father A. C. was a cashier at a bank with mother and siblings with two livein servants, one a black man, Daniel Owen, from Virginia. Ford attended a private school or seminary and studied art and languages in Burlington, Vermont. It is not clear how or when Mary moved to the Kansas area ahead of her father in 1882. She married Smith Moses Ford about October 8, 1878, when she was known as Minnie Finnie and was living in Winfield, Kansas. She was his second wife. S.M. Ford was a former alderman, teacher, newspaper writer and eventually newspaper publisher. Their first child, Roland Ford, was born circa 1879.

It was after this that Mary Hanford Ford became visible as a member of clubs. Circa 1880, Ford was among a circle of women who formed the Friends Council Club in Kansas City, of an intentionally limited number of members, and focused on reviewing the history, literature, philanthropy, and art of early civilizations. For the June 4, 1880, US Census, the family was living on 7th St in Kansas City, Missouri, with her parents and siblings and their own children. Father Asahel C. and husband Smith M. were in real estate, as was her brother Elmer. There were also three black servants in the house and five boarders. Circa 1882, Ford was visible entertaining visitors. Another early club Ford was involved in was the Social Science Club; she was visible speaking at a regional conference in 1884. Ford's daughter Lynette was born in 1886.

=== Rising tide of visibility ===
1884 and 1885 was Ford's first known writing appeared in print. A short article, "What is Wanted", was fairly widely published including Illinois, Indiana, Iowa, Kansas, Maine, Ohio, and Pennsylvania. Ford pointed out that, in the past, people only needed or wanted food and shelter, but even though some still lacked these basic needs, growing spiritual needs were developed that required a home that provided a quiet and private space to develop one's individuality, away from gossip and criticism, a home should be a place where children can maintain their innocence and not grow up too quickly. She criticizes most Americans for having mere places to stay rather than true homes that foster love, thoughts, and morals and fail to recognize their home as a place of spiritual importance, with material possessions and obligations taking precedence over religious beliefs. "But the idea of a heart center, where love is cherished, thoughts are fostered and morals expanded, is apparently unheard of in their philosophy. Materfamilias goes to church on Sunday without an idea that she is leaving the holiest temple behind her, of which she is high priestess, and if you should dissect her brain you would find that in the corner devoted to 'necessities' the strata of clothes, cooks, sewing girls and roast turkey fill up all but the smallest crevice consciously set aside for religious belief and church membership." That same period, after having been an atheist for most of her life, Ford became a Spiritist and a believer in the afterlife when her father died in Kansas City.

In July 1888, Ford published the instructive article "Mrs. Diaz and the Woman's Exchange Idea" in a periodical. Her last child was born in September 1888, the same month an article in The York Daily describes her as being "recognized in the west as an authority on literary matters", and she was quoted saying, of the role of the US President's wife, "...By countenancing the suffrage movement she could make it more fashionable ..." In October, she was the only woman, among four vice presidents, elected for a newly founded Missouri and Kansas authors' organization. That year was also Ford's last birth.

In 1889 she was an officer of the Western Authors and Artists Club (WCCA) of Kansas City, writing various articles including a series for Edward Bellamy's The Nationalist, an article reviewing a book on artists for The Dial, and then a series of stories for Wide Awake, a children's magazine, a series that continued in 1890.

In 1891, now a member of the Kansas City Art association, she took part in the opening of an exhibit. This same year she wrote the book, Which will win? or Which wins?, and co-wrote a play. "Mary H. Ford ... says in her preface to the book that there are many men, like Wagner's Parsifal, whose eyes turn inward, who feel the sufferings of others so vividly that they will turn their backs upon worldly prosperity and sacrifice all worldly profit for the good of their fellow-creatures. With such men lies the possibility of the race for real reform, and they represent a proportion of humanity much larger now than at any other time, she thinks. ... " The book was dedicated to the Farmers' Alliance and covers life on farms and the effect mortgage systems had on it, and specifically examined the ways a woman's inheritance could be taken away. It was well reviewed locally, in Chicago and beyond. From a Boston review: "although the work of an unknown author, is regarded ... as likely to arouse attention. Nothing is known of Mrs. Mary H. Ford of Kansas City, ... (but) a woman of extended acquaintance both in political and social circles. ... The didactic moral of the book is interwoven with a love-tale, the idea evidently being to reach the story reading public in the same way that Bellamy reached the public with his 'Looking Backward'." However another reviewer said "If the 'labor question' could be settled by writing weak or sensational novels concerning it, all difficulties would speedily vanish ... Which Wins, by Mary H Ford ... would be likely to interest the farmer more if it had less about Parsifal in it." A letter-to-the-editor campaign by George Ward supported it in several newspapers.

One reviewer profiled Ford herself:

Mrs Ford is an Eastern woman by birth, and has spent a great deal of her life in Boston, where she is well known and esteemed for her superior capabilities. ... She possesses one of the finest libraries west of the Mississippi, which is rich in art works, rare translations from the Sanscrit, and the choicest editions of the poets. Her education is thorough to a remarkable degree ... Aside from her literary ability, Mrs. Ford is a practical newspaper woman, and can pen a political editorial with the crisp conciseness of a vertebral chief-of-staff. When that historical attempt to run all the emancipated slaves into Kansas was made, Mrs. Ford accepted a commission from the New York Tribune to investigate the matter, and her series of caustic and exhaustive letters attained a national importance.

The new play was called The Syndicate and it opened in November 1891. It was a local success by early 1892 and positives review were carried in various places but its sympathies with farmers and the Farmers' Alliance were controversial to some.

That spring Ford hosted a tent of her own at a local fair.

=== Transition to Chicago (1893–1894) ===
In March 1893, a man sued Ford's husband $50,000 for having "alienated the affections of his wife and caused her to desert him in 1887" and also for having abducted the couple's daughter in 1888. A week later, replacing a previously announced speaker, Ford gave an hour-long address at a mass meeting of the local suffrage movement to encourage women's interest in the upcoming municipal election. Ford continued to give lectures on Women's Suffrage, including one detailing the accomplishments the movement had effected in Missouri. In May she was again an officer of the WCCA. In June she attended the Chicago World's Fair, which ran from May 1, 1893, to October 30, 1893, where she was seen as a "strong believer in women" and "American art" and gave a talk on "Woman in Art Today". She was later called a guide at the Exposition and the strength of her support for American art was still echoing in October when she again presented, this time on "The Old Masters and the New" (in art) and published an article in the Chicago Tribune covering impressionism at the Expo in October. By early December she and her children were "taken up" by the "society women" of Chicago. She was noted as an avid supporter of impressionism and American art, and was offering classes in her home in Chicago. She also hosted an exhibition in her home in December that was well received in the news and announced a series of lectures for the coming year for the "Arché Club" suggesting she had already traveled in Europe. The club would soon be a primary vehicle for Ford's talks.

In January 1894, she presented "Art and the Revolution" to the Sons of the American Revolution chapter in Chicago. "It was something entirely original, and was in itself almost a history of that time of struggle" and noted particularly Benjamin West and his painting The Death of Wolfe remarking that this was the first American artist to paint what people really wore and not classical garments. In February she gave a talk reviewing sculpture for the Arché club. The article noted that one day at the Exposition she had spoken during the absence of a planned speaker: "Mrs. Ford did not look as though she would set the world on fire with her eloquence ... but she certainly did inspire the audience, and since that memorable day she has made great strides forward." About a week later she gave a talk on French art: "She showed a thorough acquaintance with her subject, and her talk was replete with incidents in the lives of the artists spoken of, as well as thorough criticism of their works." A month later she was doing a talk for the benefit of the University Creche (Day care) of the Children's Aide Society that featured Dante Gabriel Rossetti and Edward Burne-Jones. The end of that week she gave a talk at Hull House on English art. A couple weeks later she gave a talk for the Arché club on American stained glass. Finishing her winter classes, summer classes were announced in May while she gave a talk at a private collection. In between, she gave classes every two weeks. In the fall an article of hers on artists' lineages was to be published and was noted coming out of Boston. In October, a series of twenty talks by Ford was outlined for Fridays by the Arché club. A month later came news that Otto's Inspiration would be published, and it was released in 1895. The new series of talks was noted in a few articles: On Millet, American art, and about a week later on French illustrators, for the Arché club. So in 1894 she had taught classes sometimes weekly and given talks noted in newspapers somewhere between monthly and weekly for the year and in the Fall finished a book about to come out. 1895 would see a serious rise in the reports of her talks.

== Chicago and a new career ==
=== 1895 – A powerful year ===
In early January, Ford gave lectures on Honoré de Balzac, Édouard Manet, and on Trilby, a recently published novel. She initiated a series of classes on "English Art", and a second series on Shakespeare, meeting about every two weeks. Meanwhile, individual talks continued into mid-January (even naming one of the rooms after her) for the Arché club. A few days later she gave a talk on George Sand, and Trilby, and another talk in the next week. There are yet three more talks noted before the end of January: Millet before the Chicago South Side Women's club, Édouard Manet and impressionism for the Arché club, and Rosa Bonheur for her class.

February continued the pace. She began a series before the new Chicago Culture Club at the Church of the Epiphany (Chicago), and less than a week later gave a talk on Hamlet, and then another for a benefit dinner. A few days later she gave a talk for the Menoken Club. She ended the Arché club series with a talk on "Degas, Raffaelli, and their theories". There was an individual talk on March 10 on The Tempest, followed by a "salon day" for the Arché club. Then she announced another series of lectures and continued the individual talks. The first series of talks during some recitals at individual's homes on Beethoven, Wagner, and Schumann each a week apart in what is now the Prairie Avenue District. Meanwhile, she gave a talk on "Shakespeare's women" at the new YWCA in what is now the Historic Michigan Boulevard District, Then she lectured on the subject of "American Colonists". A week later she was talking for the Arché club. The last few days of March she addressed and reviewed Chicago artists, in which she was quoted extensively for in a column in The Inter Ocean newspaper of Chicago. Papers also noted that by April the talks had outgrown the space of rooms in churches. Nevertheless, benefits were still held in churches, such as for the YWCA with a talk about John Ruskin, also a Spiritualist. Another publicized talk at a home was on "French Women of the Salon". She made a trip outside Chicago to Sterling, IL for a talk the next day. But she was back in time to give a talk in a week, and in a few days was giving a new talk entitled "Nibelungen Lied(sic)". In May she gave two lectures. A repeat of one of the recitals comes in early June, held at the Hotel Windermere (Chicago). In a new turn of events, Ford challenged the Inter Ocean art critic on the virtues of impressionism - the critic opens with a line from Ford's letter to her "After having told the world what you see in Manet's pictures, don't you think you should do the graceful thing and tell what the artist sees?". Together they reviewed an exhibition, out of which the critic concedes "... and truth to tell (Manet's defender) took home the palm."

Known locations of talks of Ford in 1895

In August, Ford presented on Wagner's trilogy at Green Acre, in Eliot, Maine. This was an early link in events that would become important for Ford in 1901.

In September, with the Arché club, she launched a series for the Winter on "Modern German Art, Literature, and Music", and directly after announcing the series she did a talk at a Wagner recital. Two other Clubs, the Harvard Club and Home Club, announced she would lead a literature group of each. A rather large crowd of women listened to her for a talk entitled "The Colonial Painters, West, Trumbull, Copley, and Stuart" in early October, while the recitals on German art and talks continued. A free series of classes was then opened up for working-class ladies taught by Ford.

The Chicago Culture club was back from the summer break as well with Ford giving the kick off talk for the Fall, followed soon by an announcement of a series on French art through the Fall, and ford gave individuals talks - a charity recital, on Louis David and even a bridal rehearsal, all before the end of October.

In November, Ford gave another talk on Wagner, as well as "Delarouche and the Vernets". A lecture a week later was presented in a home, and it was announced the success of the Arché club had reached a point of offering prizes at the next exhibition to come up. Ford gave a talk at the next meeting, while continuing to support the Chicago Culture Club. November closed a week later with talks on Ludwig Knaus and Johann Georg Meyer, and a reception honoring a number of women including Ford - an event Ford still managed to present a talk at (this time on Alexandre Dumas).

December opens with the art critic of the Inter Ocean quoting Ford analysing the difference between Glasgow School of Art practices and American and Danish-Norwegian styles of the period, following an exhibition. This was followed a week later by Ford giving a talk on "Millet and the Barbizon Circle". Then the judges for the Arché prize exhibition are announced with Ford among them, indeed representing the Arché club itself.

At least by the end of the year she was living at 3747 Langley Ave.

=== 1896 – Diversified topics and places ===
In January, Ford introduced a weekly lecture series via the Chicago Culture Club on the subject of French literary figures, Flaubert and Goncourt brothers, that continued into February, and "A Talk on Dickens" for a benefit. Only a day later Ford gave a talk for a school board, and the next day, on Thackeray, Dickens' Pickwick, George Eliot, Eugene Field, and James Whitcomb Riley. By mid-February Ford had taken up another new topic - silk - and gave a talk for a benefit, and another about Emile Zola. And then, for the first time, Ford solos presenting her talks at a theatre with tickets and she does so with a talk on literary figures, an event that drew hundreds as part of a series. Finally it came time for the Arché Club's prize exhibition "Salon". The talks progressed and the last talk of February was before the Culture Club as part of an ensemble of women talking on Charles Baudelaire and similar poets, as well as another ensemble about artful clothing.

March continued presentations among an ensemble, and Ford again presented a talk at a theatre, with two more talks lined up the second week. Then a break of a week before "Fifteen minutes with Eugene Field" was presented at the Matheon Club reception. In a few days another new topic of ceramics in art was presented. At the Chicago Culture Club reception a couple days later she gave two talks. That was followed by a talk on "The New Woman" a week later.

In April, Ford again traveled to Sterling, Illinois. She then pressed on to Bloomington, Illinois, and returned to the Chicago area for a talk in Oak Park, Illinois, and Evanston, Illinois. Then there seems to be a break to mid-May before assisting with a benefit exhibition.

Early travels of Mary Hanford Ford in 1896

That summer, Ford took part in a Chautauqua, another venue previously untapped, and rather farther afield, out of Lincoln, Nebraska. About a month later she gave a talk on culinary choices for the heat of the summer in Chicago, and then a talk at a recital. Then she assists with an exhibition from artists in the public school system.

Following the breakup scandal in Kansas City and moving to Chicago several years before her husband filed for divorce claiming alienation of affection in September. Initially there was no comment of any kind - Ford was lined up for the Arché's Salon to happen in October. However, in early October Ford appears in Kansas City - giving a talk on "Russia" (with front-page coverage) and someone wrote a letter to the editor proclaiming her success in Chicago. Days later she presents "Ibsen the Mystic's, Brand, and Peer Gynt". A week later she was speaking about "Italian Masters" a few states over in Fort Wayne, Indiana. Then two talks were announced in Chicago - the first on Turgenev and the second on Liszt. and then a week later another on American art. Then she spoke on Oliver Wendell Holmes for the Tuesday Club, Nathaniel Hawthorne and the Scarlet Letter to the Wildwood club, "American Poets" later in December, and "George Meredith, His Poems and Works". Already one was announced for January.

== Wider travels, book series and Spiritualist topics ==
=== 1897 – Message of the Mystics ===
Ford introduced the topic of vegetarianism, and then in a couple days on an English novelist. A lecture was announced for April in Sterling, Illinois. A week later she was talking on "American Religious Painters".

During this year, Ford published her three books, The Holy Grail: The Silent Teacher, Goethe's Faust: Its Ethical Symbolism and Balzac's Seraphita: The Mystery of Sex, a series known as Message of the Mystics. In The Holy Grail: The Silent Teacher Ford shared her theory that medieval romantic texts use Kabbalistic numerology to convey hidden esoteric messages. She delivered a series of six lectures, based on the books, titled The Universal Ministry with the aim of "...pointing out the unanimity with which the great poets and teachers of the world have preached the same ethical and spiritual truth." The last lecture in this series was on Spiritualist, Elizabeth Stuart Phelps.

Still in January, she gave a talk for the Independent Penwomen's Club, as well as at a private home. A week later she gave a talk for the Arché club. In February she was scheduled for a short series of talks in Goshen, Indiana. A week later a retired friend from the Chicago Daily Tribune committed suicide, naming her as one to receive the news of it at her request. She gave a series of lectures at the Masonic Temple, on variations of "The Universal Ministry" subjects. Still she kept up individual talks for the Arché club, one for a benefit, as February drew to a close and another as March opened. Minding of the pending divorce in Kansas City, instead articles noted tickets for a talk of hers there were sold starting mid-March. Meanwhile, she launched another series of talks for the Arché club, a talk on color, and a week later in Goshen, Indiana again, going back to Chicago the next day for a talk. At the beginning of April, Ford was in Kansas City giving her series of talks including the "Holy Grail" and other recent topics, as well as receptions held in her honor, and individual talks for a benefit, and otherwise. She gave her last talk, and notes of her talks were reported, while she went back to Chicago.

The divorce was granted, noting she didn't even appear in court. She returned anyway in another month - a quiet month considering her usual pattern - announcing a series and a summer appearance, and still the individual talks here and there, over in Leavenworth, Kansas, before the Kansas City Chautauqua (as an advertised lead attraction), speaking in the "Hall of Philosophy". Still she squeezed in individual talks in June, including a benefit, before heading back to Chicago. However, after a month plus she appears giving talks in Ludington, Michigan on the social mission of Christianity, and then in Waterloo, Iowa initiating a series of talks. The next day still in Waterloo she gave two talks. Later in August she returned to the Chicago area.

The Arché club had Ford as the "club lecturer" for the season and noted two talks specifically in October, and then a talk at the Menoken Club. Later in October at a conference of women's clubs Ford spoke of promoting arts with the group letting her talk twice the allotted time.

November began with a talk at the Arché club, with another in a couple weeks. Her book series Message of the Mystics was noted for sale in Kansas City. A series of conferences on social development were announced by the Forward Movement and Ford was among the speakers. She closes out November with a talk for the Arché club.

Ford starts another series of talks in December featured in a home. The Forward Movement's speakers for the conferences in the second week of December were announced including Clarence Darrow and Ford (on "The Artist's Aristocracy"). Her talk focused on John Ruskin (also a Spiritualist), and William Morris. She returned to the subject of Ruskin two weeks later. Meanwhile, her books continued to be noticed, and received some summary in the publication of it as the year closes.

=== 1898 – More personal coverage ===
The new year began the same "Holy Grail" talk from her books, first before the "Noonday Rest" Club - reportedly with some 300 present - and broaching a Parcifal angle that would later be a book. Just a few days later she gave the same named talk to clubs in Sedalia, Missouri. A week later she was back in Chicago, this time speaking on Tolstoi, and the ongoing series in a home continued into February. Among these she also attended a regional conference of women clubs in Missouri. Still in February she gave a talk to the Hull House women about a trip of hers to Spain, and then addressed the Nineteenth Century Club in Benton Harbor, Michigan before mid-February. The next talk was for the Englewood Woman's club and was on Ivan Turgenev, and then Rembrandt over in Fort Wayne, Indiana (that makes three states in one month she gave talks), and scheduled for a talk in Sterling, Illinois, next month, though she finishes out February back in Chicago.

March began with a talk before the Arché club on Robert Louis Stevenson, followed by a talk in a home on Quo vadis (possibly on the novel). A day later she returned to her subject "The Holy Grail". A week later she was indeed in Fort Wayne.

Early travels of Mary Hanford Ford in 1898

In April she was visible giving a talk before the "Twentieth Century Sanitary Home and Bulsson Institute" in Chicago, and then the Æolus club. Just a couple days later she spoke before the Society of Art on "Israel and His Followers". A week later she was in Marshall, Michigan giving a talk. She gave a series of talks in Topeka, Kansas before mid-May, the first program of the federated clubs, before returning to Chicago, just days later, speaking on James Whitcomb Riley and Eugene Field. A week later Ford was set to be one of the speakers before a conference of clubs across the city along with artists and instructors. A wider regional conference was set in Denver in June and Ford went representing the Aloha club. In early July she was in the Waterloo Chautauqua. Ford was recognized as a key figure in Arche club and Chicago Culture Club history.

In August, the Ford family made the news with their picnics on the beach of Lake Michigan. Mary, her children and a few other families, with their several youths, are noted as attending. The family's home also made the news with Ford talking about a ghost in her home (housekeeper, children, and herself speaking of it). Another ghost reference briefly referred back to this coverage later in September.

In September, Hull House announced a series through the Fall, Winter and into the Spring, with Ford giving a talk once a month from October to March. The Arché club similarly announces a series of talks including Ford every other week into about January. The Arché coverage was noted in Nebraska.

The Chicago Times-Herald did a profile of Ford in November and it was echoed widely through December. Calling her "a woman of wide intellectuality" there is no mention of her husband's publicity or divorce. It simply refers to "unexpected circumstance which suddenly necessitate the caring for and education of her children ... dropping of the financial burden upon her slender shoulders". It credits her with over 800 talks and across many major cities(though not a detailed accounting) and having given lectures in German and French in addition to English. Another article, and her talk before the Hull House, noted she "... for three consecutive years has come before the club, each time with something new in itself, or, if old, made new by the happy, infectious personality of the speaker. ... " Now in November, talks continued with Ford among a free series. She was profiled on her sense of being guided in some decisions like coming to Chicago. In the interview she spoke of dreaming about the "conference of the World's Unity league" at Lake Geneva with a figure that told her to go. Late in November she was again profiled, noting she was "abolishing all class distinction within her household" having gone from perhaps an anarchist view to a libertarian socialism view - "At all events, I believe in sowing the good seed whenever possible. ... " Then she spoke before the Englewood Woman's club, then in a week she was profiled in Trenton, New Jersey, and spoke before the Arché club back in Chicago, and contributed to a benefit reception. Talks continue to the end of November.

And December's talks began on Ralph Waldo Emerson, followed by others, including Percy Bysshe Shelley. She made it to New York City in mid-December and ended the year in Dixon, Illinois.

=== 1899 – A slower pace, and reaching Boston ===
Ford began the year reviewing American decorative art with reproductions from the Boston Public Library. Next was "Russia" before the Chicago Literary Score, and then on Tennyson (even advertised in Nebraska).

In February, after two weeks, she spoke again, and then in another two weeks was in Benton Harbor, Michigan on the Holy Grail topic. By late February a series was run in Dixon, Illinois, for the Phidian Art Club, but ended the month in Fort Wayne, Indiana, (noting in three days she did three talks in two cities). In March she was back in Fort Wayne and right back to Chicago, and back still again to Fort Wayne. A week later she offered a talk at a benefit in Chicago for a "Charity Hospital" and soon after on Maeterlinck for the Chicago Culture Club. A week later she spoke for the Independent Pen Woman's Club on her subject of "The Aristocracy of Art", and then she was in Dixon, Illinois talking on John La Farge. A week later she was talking on "Society and Fiction" at another benefit for the same "Charity Hospital", and before a program Ford devised for a club in Springfield, Missouri. After a couple weeks she gave a talk at a home on "The Present Day Value of Occultism".

In later April she was named an associate director of the Illinois Art league, and closed out the month at a home based talk "The reality of psychic vision".

After taking off near two weeks she gives a talk on Victor Hugo, and then in July in a Logansport, Indiana a quip of hers headed a suggested menu for an event.

In August she goes from a talk in Dubuque, Iowa, to a talk in the Alice Breed home in Lynn, Massachusetts where she did a series of some ten of her lecture subjects - and this noted in the Kansas City area as well. The Breed family would be one she would have many interactions with in coming years. From September to October is there a gap in coverage. She is next noted in Dubuque, Iowa in mid-October in the midst of a series of talks. She was announced in the season's talks of the Chicago Culture Club as well. She presented a talk for the Arché club later in October, among a larger list of speakers. A month later she spoke on Harriet Beecher Stowe for the Arché Club. In a few days she gave a talk in Kansas City, and was scheduled for a series in Dixon, Illinois in late November. Two weeks later in near mid-December she was listed as a guest at a breakfast while another presents a talk for the meeting.

=== 1900 – Fewer talks, more distance ===
January 1900 began with a longer version, and more in her own words, of the ghost story in Ford's home - and carried in the New York Tribune. A little more than a week later Ford gave a talk on Bret Harte for the Arché club. In a couple days she shared a stage with another speaker on the Fabian Society, and another on Bret Harte.

Travels of Mary Hanford Ford in 1900

In February a poem of hers was published in the New York Times echoed from the Chicago Post - "The song unsung". A week later she gives a talk on William Dean Howells for the Arché club. She closes out February with a talk on Whistler. Nearly two weeks later she was in Fort Wayne, before heading back to New York. There was a district club meeting she spoke at on color, and a few days later she was in Dixon, Illinois for a talk each offered on color, and French artists. By the end of April she was back in Chicago giving a talk on "American Poets".

The next talk, still on color, was in late May, in Freeport, Illinois, and she returned a week later to repeat, and was the center of a reception June 5 directly before going to Ottumwa, Iowa before the second week of June where she accomplished two series of lectures. That summer US Census, Ford and three Missouri-born children lived on 7th St, Hyde Park, IL. Ford was listed as widowed, having born and had 3 children, not marking lost any in infancy, was noted as a lecturer, son Roland as an artist, while the other two were students at school.

The earliest newspaper coverage of the Baháʼí Faith, a religion she was about to adopt, in the Chicago area - the first group of Baháʼís in the country - occurred from mid-October 1900. However Ford was out of town - in mid-October Ford began a series of talks in Oak Park, Illinois, mid-November successively in Kansas City, Bloomington, Illinois, and then Sedalia, Missouri.

She wrote the introduction to The story of Abraham Lincoln; or, The journey from the log cabin to the White House by Eleanor Gridley.

== Finding the Baháʼís ==
=== 1901 – A year of changes ===
Like the recent Januaries, Ford's ghost-story home was referred to by another newspaper story; this time someone was seeking to live in one like hers. It turned out that Ford's family was no longer living there. Her household was noted as an eclectic mix of family and boarders - her three children, Roland, Lynette and Gareth; a Germon woman and her young child; of an American woman and her son; of a young African or African American student of Shakespeare.

In the Winter of 1900-1901 Ford took a comparative religion class and encountered the Baháʼí Faith. This could have been, for example, through the University of Chicago, through "Vesper Services" lectures, or academic classes (for example "Religions of ancient India and Persia"). John Henry Barrows was a staff member and had been deeply involved in the 1893 World Parliament of Religions, where the Baháʼí Faith was mentioned, and that winter Charles Cuthbert Hall had been hired by the university, being appointed to an endowed lectureship based on the enthusiasm of the Parliament of Religions. It wouldn't be the only such series to be undertaken. However, in addition, whether Ford knew it or not, Baháʼís had arrived in Chicago who were sent by ʻAbdu'l-Bahá and began public presentations on the religion in December 1900 and January 1901.

Ford's ex-husband, Smith Moses Ford, died April 10.

The New York Times noted her selling an apartment in New York to her son in July.

After the comparative religion class in Chicago, Ford heard that more about the religion was to be learned at Green Acre Baháʼí School at the northern fringe of Greater Boston. Sarah Farmer, founder of the school, was publicly linked with the religion in June after she had found truth in various religions and quasi-religious groups. But of the Baháʼí Faith, it was explained, "... she has found the common faith in which all devout souls may unite and yet be free." It was then announced Green Acre would be a place to learn of the religion, run in parallel with the other classes already established, but for free. James T. Bixby, who had written previous on the religion's history, (which Ford herself would soon write differently), was presenting on the religion, but Mírzá Abu'l-Faḍl, among the most scholarly trained Baháʼís of the time, was there. Ali Kuli Khan, to serve as his translator, arrived in the United States in June. A Baháʼí publication notes Abu'l-Faḍl's talk titled "Utterances of Baháʼu'lláh" and Ford herself giving a talk "Lectures in Literature". Green Acre closed for the season in September.

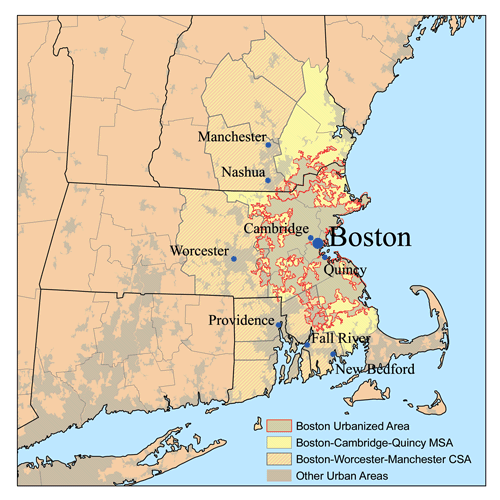
Green Acre is on the southern border of Maine and New Hampshire

Abu'l-Faḍl had accompanied Anton Hadded, the first Baháʼí to live in the United States, on his return trip to America. They too had been sent by then head of the religion, ʻAbdu'l-Bahá. The later well known Baháʼí Agnes Baldwin Alexander was there. It was at these classes with Abu'l-Faḍl that Ford is considered to have joined the religion, at the age of 44.

In Arches of the Years Alice Breed's granddaughter Marzieh Gail recalled: "When (Ali Kuli Khan) was translating for Abu'l-Faḍl at Green Acre, Mary Hanford Ford introduced him to Alice Breed". Gail also noted Ford was the "spiritual mother" of Alice Breed - that Ford lead her to the religion. Ford was visible in the Boston area in October for one talk on color, then a series of talks, and in early November where she gave a talk at Chickering Hall, Boston, with subjects like "Christ's message and its relation to his time" "The Primitive Church, or the Ideal of Brotherhood Love", and "The significance of the Holy Grail" in early December, and talks planned into January the next year. In addition Ford also participated in an animal rescue league meeting speaking on "The value of humane education for the young" in mid-November.

In November there was also more coverage of Baháʼís in New York highlighting Lua Getsinger.

=== The Boston community ===
In January news of Farmer's involvement in the religion continued to spread as well as of the religion in general, and Ford was known to have moved to Boston - Ford and the Breed family invited Ali Kuli Khan to move to Boston and together form the first active community of Baháʼís there.

News that Ford was working on translating Charles Paul de Kock's began to be noted in 1902, and 1903. News spread (in Kansas City and Kansas) that the Baháʼí Faith was being promoted in New England, and in July Ford was giving a series of talks at Greenacre. In September a talk of hers, amplified by quotes translated by Ali Kuli Khan from Mirza Abu Fazl, was profiled in the Boston Journal - it reviewed spirituality and history as a call for a new religion. She was then published giving talks in Boston in October, and November. By December Baháʼís in Chicago knew she was a Baháʼí and working with Sarah Farmer on projects. A talk of hers in December was also noted in the Boston Herald.

In March 1904 someone gave a talk on Ford's books in Kansas, while news of another book of Ford's came out - Legends of Parsifal - and news of it continues progressively over the year. Her Kock books also came out. Still news on her "The Holy Grail" appears.

In October Khan and Florence Breed were married.

In December Ford gave her Grail talk to the Lethren club in Boston.

In the Spring, Ford gave a talk in Springfield on art. Ali Kuli Khan and perhaps others passed most of the summer of 1905 in Green Acre. Ford was listed as an honorary member of the Arché Club that year.

In April 1906 Ali Kuli Khan gave a talk at the Breed home and then he and his new wife left for Persia. During their trip they first went on pilgrimage to meet ʻAbdu'l-Bahá where Mrs. Ali Kuli Khan later recalled these words of ʻAbdu'l-Bahá - "It is true that Mrs. Ford has served humanity long and faithfully. Now tell her, if she will arise to serve the Cause of Baháʼu'lláh with equal zeal and fidelity, her name will be mentioned in all the worlds of God."

The August issue of Brush and Pencil had an article "American Art Eminently Distinctive" by Ford. The December issue of Success (magazine) had a short story by Ford: "Love enough for all". The story began with a husband swearing about "modern club-woman" with contrary ideas on raising children, but as the story continues the impatient mother gets in an accident who did not deal well with the child that adored her yet kept her from clubs. While recuperating she marvels at the housewife who can hold a conversation with guests and husband, children entertained, house well kept, and she well loved. The recuperating lady dreams and sees marvels all giving gifts to this one who loves all and is loved. In the Fall of 1906 Ford had a story published in the Overland Monthly.

By the Winter of 1906 Louis Bourgeois, later architect of the Baháʼí House of Worship in Wilmette, Illinois, and his wife had joined the religion after having "come into association with the Baha'i Faith through Marie Watson and Mary Hanford Ford." But by late December 1906, Ford and her son had moved back to Kansas City.

== Back to Missouri and pilgrimage ==
A week after her arrival in Kansas City Ford gave two lectures. Then she spoke on Ibsen at Frazer Hall at the University of Kansas in January 1907 and she noted she was going abroad. In February Ford addressed comments on each of the artists showing at a university art exhibit, and had an article published in The Public. In April Ford was on the program of a Kansas state meeting of women's clubs.

Ford wrote that she went on pilgrimage to meet ʻAbdu'l-Bahá in 1907 traveling over land through Europe, Turkey, and down through Syria, at the age of 50. She connected with Baháʼís in Paris on the way to Switzerland/Italy. Ford later wrote of getting passed "plague and quarantine" and of hearing of fresh Baha'i martyrs while staying in Paris.

The house occupied by ʻAbdu'l-Bahá in Palestine then was the House of ʻAbdu'lláh Páshá.

January 1908 began with notice that Ford's talks were the first priority of the federated clubs of Topeka, while she was visible in Kansas City, but it was still an open question in early February what would happen. A week later the news is clear - Ford was to come in March for a short series of lectures. It is said she gave some talks in Kansas City in late February or early March. The topic of her Topeka talks announced is Chateaux de Touraine. Final preparations are taken, and the upcoming talks are praised suggesting it has been previewed. The first talk centers on "Chinon and Loches" and mentions Joan of Arc, a mention she would later use to example love in religion.

Overall the Baháʼís in Chicago heard that Ford was active in Kansas City.

In September Ford was living in Kansas City, and by November she was noted giving "parlor talks". In December she attended, and her comments are reported for, an exhibition there.

In January 1909 Ford was still drawing on her pilgrimage experience referring to descriptions in Turkey and Syria in a talk she gave in Leavenworth, Kansas – and a series of talks was also announced, followed by another focused on Italian cities. But in February she offers an individual talk as well - "Social adjustment, family relation and revival of neighborship", and offers follow-up talks on the religion. After a month another talk was visible, which were then called weekly talks (the next one on American art and craftsman guild, then on called "books as dangerous things").

Up until mid-June Ford had been a vice president of the Women's Dining Club but on the resignation of the president noting that the club had "... formed among the women who have accomplished things in Kansas City to solve the problems which confront women in this city", Ford was elected president.

Later in December Ford spoke for a women's group on strike or worked in a sweatshop in New York. She was in fact in suffrage meetings with Alva Belmont.

== A book, abroad, and troubled in Britain in absentia ==
1910 starts out noting Ford's daughter Lynette lived in New York by February and Ford was noted visiting over the previous winter finishing work on a book. Ford published The Oriental Rose: Or, The Teachings of Abdul Baha which Trace the Chart of "the Shining Pathway" in 1910 and it came out before mid-October. In March Ford was elected to the Baháʼí organization "Woman's Board" of New York, a precursor to the Local Assembly, and was a delegate to the national convention of Baháʼís. She visited John Sloan in New York in April. While in New York, she spoke to an audience about the religion, her pilgrimage, and her various activities were noted thankfully.

A July issue of Post Magazine included the article "On the Equivocation of 'Matter'", which was also published in the Buffalo Courier.

Starting in 1910, the head of the Baháʼí Faith, ʻAbdu'l-Bahá, was on various stages of a journey once freed from arrest. During the period in Paris there is record of a phone call – the caller may have been Ford. Ford was in Paris and was happy to see him free. She left a description and recorded some of the talks and described the atmosphere of how being around him was for people. She spent two weeks there with ʻAbdu'l-Bahá.

A month before ʻAbdu'l-Bahá's arrival in America, Ford wrote an article profiling the history of the religion, its presence in parts of the world, and ʻAbdu'l-Bahá himself, which covered over half a page in the New York Sun. ʻAbdu'l-Bahá left America for Britain in December, France in January, Germany in April. In February 1913 Ford's book Oriental Rose was being read and commented on by Marshall Black in prison in California.

Before ʻAbdu'l-Bahá left America he commented in the progress of women's equality, noting "Demonstrations of force, such as are now taking place in England, are neither becoming nor effective in the cause of womanhood and quality". A few months later, in March–April 1913, a suffrage women's organization, the Women's Social and Political Union (WSPU) in Britain, was broken up by Scotland Yard. Led by Flora Drummond the group tried Ford in absentia in April for the failure of their plans. Arrests and releases took place in February and March and some of the incidents were coordinated by WPSU itself. Ford was present and acting for a release, and coverage did appear in American newspapers, but she claimed she knew nothing of any of the charges the group had brought against her. Newspapers covered the report in many places, including places Ford had given talks - Independence, Kansas, Fort Wayne, Indiana, and Boston, Massachusetts. There had in fact been some tensions among suffrage workers in Britain because some had attempted an arson and bombing campaign and the group had been infiltrated by women working for Scotland Yard who passed on warnings of the violence of the group. Late April coverage vindicated Ford and that her involvement had been through diplomatic channels only. While this news unfolded in later April Ford attended and addressed the national convention of Baháʼís in New York. Later in June she was noted speaking on "Abdul Baha's teaching on Immortality", her first known talk on the religion to a general audience, to the "Negro Society for Historical Research" cofounded by John Edward Bruce and Arturo Alfonso Schomburg.

After ʻAbdu'l-Bahá returned to Egypt almost ending his travels outside of Palestine he sent a tablet/letter responding to a letter from Ford on October 23, 1913.

== War years ==
=== In California ===
In 1914 Ford, mentioning she had been to Florence, Italy, addressed an audience in Pittsburgh, Pennsylvania on the brewing "European War" as it was called.

In January through March 1915 Ford gave a series of talks in Kansas City. In April the Baháʼís organized a presence at the Panama–Pacific International Exposition and Ford was a keynote speaker. Her talk, as part of a review of the entire proceedings, was included in Baháʼí World, a text bringing together developments of the religion from around the world, in volume 8. This was followed by a Baháʼí meeting during Ridván at the home of Helen S. Goodall in Oakland, California Ford attended and reported on in Star of the West, among the earliest national publications of the religion. In September Ford spoke in San Mateo. Ford continued in Oakland in October with a month of Monday lectures on art hosted by a group of women including Florence Breed Khan, or as she was called, Mrs. Ali Kuli Khan. The Khan's had hit a "rough patch" in their marriage exacerbated by subterfuge by Persian relations during which Ford became concerned as she had introduced them. While there she was visited by her son Roland. Ford visited Portland and Seattle Baháʼís, and then another series of talks was noted in November back in Oakland, as well as a separate talk on peace, and still another on art at the Palace of Fine Arts. Come January 1916 another series was launched in Oakland and highlighted the new architectural forms in the West of the US. In February Ford lectures for Mills College, in March she began a series of talks, and lectured for the Ebell Society club that extends into May. Meanwhile, Ford's mother died in March, and in April Ford and Mrs. Khan are noted as patronesses of a child theatre. Near mid-summer Ford was in Portland Oregon giving a talks - one in the public library on world peace with William Hoar, and another before the local art association. The following July she was in Denver giving a talk on peace for the local women's club.

=== Traveling ===
Early travels giving talks as a Baháʼí

By September 1916, Ford had begun traveling. First she spoke before the Baháʼís of Washington, D.C. on peace, then early November she gave a talk "Spiritual Internationalism" for the Chicago Peace Society, in cooperation with the Chicago Branch of the Woman's Peace Party, then a series on the Baháʼí Faith's view various subjects in nearby Rockford, IL, and then in Wilmette, Illinois a little over a week later came an announcement of the purchase of increased land area for the Baháʼí House of Worship in Wilmette. She returned to Rockford in December for a talk on color.

In January 1917 Ford was back in Washington, D.C., and in March she was in Boston speaking before the "Free Religious Association of America", and contributed an article to Star of the West on "The economic teaching of Abdul-Baha", which was later included in the first Baháʼí World volume. In April she was in New York at a Friends of Abdul Baha meeting at St. Mark's in-the-Bouwerie, and at the national Baháʼí convention held in Boston, and elsewhere in May. By August she was in Topeka Kansas giving her first talk in the region presenting the religion. She mentioned H. G. Wells' publication, God the Invisible King, which mentioned the religion (and to Ford's reading matched the idea of God in the Baháʼí Faith).

By January 1918 Ford was back in the Oakland California area helping to host non-denominational meetings on uplifting people's lives. By April, Ford was also giving a talk on art. That December, she was back in Kansas for a weekly series of talks, as well as individual talks. On January 26, 1919, Ford received another letter/tablet from ʻAbdu'l-Bahá in response to a letter from her.

In May she was on the program for the national Baháʼí observance during Ridván again, and then addressed the national convention of Baháʼís and her talk published in the Star of the West.

Second tour of talks as a Baháʼí

In July she was in Buffalo, New York giving a talk on the religion, then Sandusky, Ohio in August, Pittsburg, Kansas in September, Urbana, Illinois in October, Chicago, Illinois the next day, before doing a round of locations in Kansas: after a short say in Kansas City she went to St. Joseph, Kansas, and was scheduled for Hutchinson, Kansas in January 1920. These do indeed occur, as well as a side trip to Sterling, Kansas for a talk. Then Ford was in Hutchinson, Kansas for a reception following a week of talks. But soon she was back in New York and this time for an extended stay.

== Postwar years in New York ==
In early February 1920, Ford was in New York for a national meeting of Baháʼís. She was still around the area a few weeks later in Brooklyn. This was also the time when she met with the First Emmanuel Church community co-presenting on a recent pilgrimage before the Christian community. While sporadic at first, she would soon be well ensconced in activities at the Church. First Emmanuel had been founded by 1914 by African American Rev. Richard Manuel Bolden and his wife Medora. They had founded the church in what at the time was the white side of Harlem after separating from the Mother AME Zion Church. Within a decade, the black side of Harlem expanded from the Great Migration to re-surround the Boldens' initiative. Aside from a personal attachment to Rev. Bolden, the church community was engaged as part of Bolden's vision of the "God with us" even from inside of us. A number of Bahá'ís responded to this necessarily interracial initiative of a black church in white Harlem that was First Emmanuel before 1918, and this expanded such that by January 1920 regular Bahá'í meetings began to be held, and doubled to two different meetings a week, and a second African American minister - James T. Simpson, a chaplain in the U.S.Army during the war joining the Church by January 1920 - being closely involved. This is what Ford stepped into in February. Meanwhile, Ford was locally visible in mid-April at St. Mark's-in-the-Bouwerie, another New York church with a close affiliation with Bahá'ís, mixing explicitly Baháʼí oriented talks and music or art topics. In May at the meeting during Ridvan Ford addressed the attendees of the National Bahá'í convention in New York.

=== First Emmanuel Church and Reality magazine ===
From late July 1920 through October 1922 Ford became a fixture at First Emmanuel Church in a variety of settings. Back in February she had co-presented to the church community but in late July she was part of the Thursday evening "Rainbow Circle" meetings that had been founded by Bahá'ís and then moved to First Emmanuel. A second set of Bahá'í meetings also took form, the "Baha'i Association", by March. Most of the coverage of these is from the African American newspaper, the New York Age.

By early August, a number of Bahá'ís, including Ford, gathered at the Circle meeting, including a Persian dinner and presentations of many, including Mabel Rice-Wray of Detroit, (mother of Edris Rice-Wray Carson,) and Rev. Howard Colby Ives, (later author of Portals of Freedom). The group formed its own organizational constitution, and Ford continued to be a regular into September. Across the same period she was the main presenter during an extended exhibition with a model of the Bahá'í Temple during its stay in New York. By late September Bolden had received a letter from 'Abdu'l-Bahá apparently accepting his declaration as a Bahá'í, because he and his church we all proclaimed as Bahá'ís in the DC Washington Bee mid-month. In September she also spoke at another Bahá'í center of activity, the Omar Khayyam, opened by some Persian Baháʼís. Then Ford published an article "The Rainbow Circle" in Reality magazine published in the October issue describing some of the history and names involved in this project that came to First Emmanuel, and Bahá'í meetings at the Church became regular entries in the magazine as well. Ford presented at the early October Sunday morning services, while at the evening service Bolden presented Bahá'í Walter Guy a letter of introduction to the churches in St. Augustine, Florida. Rev. Simpson now contributed his own talk at the Circle meeting entitled "How I became a Bahai(sic)". Ford made her regular appearance at the Circle in early November, gave a talk on Luke 14 at the evening church service in the middle of the month, and then gave a talk "Holy Communion and its meaning" as the Sunday morning sermon about the early history of Christian meetings, to close the month. "Baha'i Association" meetings were named in coverage from November, and Bolden led the Circle meeting that included readings from 'Abdu'l-Bahá. Across Thanksgiving and into early December Ford attended multiple meetings at the Church, and then gave a sermon on Isaiah, Zachariah, and Revelations and then Bolden, Urbain Ledoux and Ford were among those that took part in the Circle meeting. Before Christmas, Bolden had founded, and had a performance of, an inter-racial choir in New York as a direct consequence of the Bahá'í Rainbow Circle, and contributed an article "America's Place in the World" published in Reality December 1920. Across Christmas week both the Baha'i Association and the Rainbow Circle had meetings including Ford and Bolden.

Ford opened January 1921, introducing returned Bahá'í pilgrims Mrs. Cooper and Mrs. Franklin of California at the Sunday evening service. Bolden and Ford attended the mid-week usual Circle meeting and then Ford read from Abdu'l-Bahá's comments on the Trinity at the close of the morning Sunday service. Bolden also took up writing another article for Reality magazine, "Our Future Government" in the January 1921 edition. Mid-January included the Association and Circle meetings and this time there were letters from other cities, including Bahá'ís Harriet Gibbs Marshall of DC, Mabry Oglesby of Boston, and others. Association and Circle meetings continued, and then, in addition to those, Urbain Ledoux contributed to the Sunday morning sermon, and Ford addressed the children's Sunday School and the afternoon Baha'i meeting while Rev. James Simpson presented on the Baha'i Revelation and talked about the prospect of his pioneering. By March, Bolden was a consulting editor for Reality magazine along with Ford, Albert Vall, Howard MacNutt, and Horace Holley which continued for a time. Again there were regular Association and Circle meetings, In addition to printing articles of hers, Reality also noted some of her activities. She gave a talk "Tribute to Lathrop Ripley" (probably for the artist associated with the Rocky Mountain National Park region), March 6, 1921, in Kansas City, Missouri, her last known talk in that region, at the age of 64. Then April 13 she was at a meeting at the New York "Bahai Library" center at 416 Madison Ave. where she gave talks along with James F. Morton Jr. and Juliet Thompson. The April 1921 issue of Reality noted she went to Florida to be treated by Walter A. Guy in St. Augustine, Florida. The issue that came out in May noted her return and "constant daily attendance the Baha'i Library", and she was back to speak to the children's Sunday School of First Emmanuel in early May, the Mother's Day Sunday morning service, and at the Sunday morning sermon late in May. Louis Gregory came to give a talk as well as news of the race amity meeting of the Bahá'ís in Washington DC. Ford again spoke to the Sunday School children, as meetings and participations continued, when in July Ford was named as president of the Baha'i Association. In mid-July Ford spoke to the Sunday School children again and presided at the Baha'i Association, in addition to speaking at the Circle meeting. Late in July Bolden and Ford addressed the Sunday School with a "very large attendance... a number of visitors present" together, while the Baha'i Association and friends "motored" to the Teaneck Baha'i Center at West Englewood, the "Roy Wilhelm camp". Regular meetings continued including occasional readings from The Hidden Words and Some Answered Questions and the occasional visitor, and Ford again gave the Sunday morning sermon in late October. The second week of November Bolden's sermon pointed to the influence of dwellers on God's Holy mountain on peace plans of the time, though he did not elaborate on what he meant. Ford was also praised for "her faithfulness to the church" at the end of November, and the next week the news was shared of the death of 'Abdu'l-Bahá. The second week of December Ford gave the Sunday morning sermon on "What is meant by blasphemy against the Holy Ghost?".

Baha'i talks in New York City

It was in this time that orientalist E. G. Browne made a eulogy observation of the effect of 'Abdu'l-Bahá that "One of the most notable practical results of the Baha'i ethical teaching in the United States has been, according to the recent testimony of an impartial and qualified observer, the establishment in Baha'i circles in New York of a real fraternity between black and white, and an unprecedented lifting of the 'colour bar', described by the said observer as 'almost miraculous'."

Through the winter and into the spring of 1922 regular meetings and readings continued at the Church, amidst which a letter from Haifa on the funeral-memorial of 'Abdu'l-Bahá was read. In addition, in March Ford and Bolden again cooperated on the Sunday morning service, and Ford contributed on behalf of the Rainbow Circle on the occasion of Bolden's birthday. In March Baháʼís sponsored a dinner in New York City as an instance of its teaching on race unity – Ford spoke at the event along with Louis G. Gregory, Horace Holley, W. E. B. DuBois and others. Meanwhile, at the First Emmanuel Church, regular Bahá'í meetings, readings, talks of visitors, etc., even talks by other visiting pastors, continued through the summer of 1922.

The break in the pattern was in September 1922. The first sign of a problem was when Revs. Bolden and Simpson were announced as political adversaries. The atmosphere was surely highly charged with bullets at at least one partisan meeting. This was before Shoghi Effendi standardized avoiding political party affiliations in the religion, a principle started by 'Abdu'l-Bahá in America when asked. And this was right after the death of Medora Bolden, the pastor's wife. Among the outpouring of sympathy, flowers were sent including from the "Baha'i Headquarters" and the Rainbow Circle, but all that Simpson could do was send a condolence letter. We don't know why this situation degenerated, but following this, meetings became intermittent and then ended in October, though still mentioned in Reality in November. Rev. Simpson has yet to be found at further Bahá'í meetings, while Bolden appeared at the Bahá'í meetings across 1926-7, and Louis Gregory returned to speak at First Emmanuel in the same period.

Meanwhile, in addition to Ford's regular work through the First Emmanuel Church and after her initial writing for Reality she began to contribute to the magazine more systematically through 1921:

- January – "Claude Bragdon on the Fourth Dimension"
- February – "The Great Memorial of George Grey Barnard"
- June – "The Current Art" (reviewing the recent work of George Luks, Victor Higgins, and others as well as general exhibits)
- July – "The Symbolism of the Baha'i Temple" (note "The Current Art" from June was reprinted in July)
- August – "The Current Art" as a recurring column appears reviewing recent sales at the Anderson Galleries as a kick off to review American Art more broadly and the notes Marco Zim had done a portrait of ʻAbdu'l-Bahá and hoped to do more.
- September – "The Current Art", in which she examines some cases of why artists are artists and then noted another portrait of ʻAbdu'l-Bahá - that of Frances Soule Campbell who had been a published artist of some years.
- October – "The Current Art", noted and defended the criticized showing of Impressionist and Post-impressionist exhibit at the Metropolitan Museum that had affected American artists and then noted a bust of Dante by Paolo Abbate and work by Louis Keila.
- November – "The Current Art" notes the struggle of the wealthy with prospects of managing wealth with art as a need of the soul sometimes lost in the materialism of wealth and goes on to review notes Charles W. Bartlett and returns to the work of Marco Zim who has background as sculptor, painter, and etcher.
- December – "The Current Art" noted a traveling exhibit of American art showing in New York noting many artists and the inability to cover it all in just one article.

From April to September 1922 Ford took on general editor responsibilities of Reality magazine. Ford tried to navigate between positions she saw as "illiberalism" in the religion on the one side and editorial directives by then owner of the magazine - Herold Sweetser Robinson - that Ford failed to sustain when Robinson took the magazine down an editorial path unsupported by the mainstream in the religion. See Divisions over Shoghi Effendi as Guardian.

=== New York and United Kingdom and Italy ===
Ford was remembered as an organizing focus of the Chicago Culture Club in April 1923. Most years in the 1920s she was known to visit Italy and introduced the religion to later Hand of the Cause Ugo Giachery. Perhaps some part of each Summer - Fall would be in Italy.

Ford's first known talks at Green Acre, since joining the religion there 22 years earlier, were in July.

In February 1924 Ford gave a talk on "Communication between the Two Worlds" at a Spiritualist meeting, as well as the Bahai Library in August, and November. In December she talked for the Woman's Advance Club.

Sometime in 1924 Ford encountered Philip Leonard Green who two decades later would recall encountering the religion by contact from Ford and her gift of her book "The World of Abdu'l-Baha".

January 1925 opens with talks at the Bahai Library at 250 W 57th St., as well as attended a banquet at a Hindu center. Her talks at the Baháʼí Center continue in February, March, and April. Also the April edition of Star of the West included an article on "The new feeling of brotherhood". Talks continued at the Bahai Library in May, and June. There was a break for the summer.

In September Ford was remembered for her contribution to the Arché club studies.

Ford's talks at the Bahai Library pick up in October. In October Ford also represented the Baháʼís at a multi-faith "tribute" to Judaism in West Virginia.

Ford contributed a brief definition of who Baháʼu'lláh was in Hartmann's Who's Who in Occult, Psychic and Spiritual Realms published in November, and then Ford took up talks in the Bahai Library again. She finished out the year still doing talks at the Bahai Library.

January 1926 continued the same pattern of talks offered at the Bahai Library. These continued into February, but then there is a break until April. She continued in May, but there was then a break until December during which the old "Bahai Library" center was closed and a new center was opened at 116 W 49th St.

early Baha'i centers in New York City

She finished out the year speaking before the Pan American Commercial Congress which was attempting to reform the League of Nations focused on the Western Hemisphere, the National Club for better movies, and at the new Baha'i Center.

January 1927 began similarly at the new Center, and in February, though there was then a gap until April. In May Ford was on radio station WGL (later bought by WADO) and she was cut off the air while speaking to a banquet audience of the All Nations Association, an international peace organization, in praise of Amelia Gade Corson because the manager declared it a pacifist talk, which, according to him, "was not in line for the occasion". The news of the action was carried by Associated Press and the story printed variously in the United States. It was one of several incidents with that station. Ford later released a statement:

The All Nations association for which i was speaking feels Denmark represents the ideal for which it is working, having created peace through disarmament, I said that as Mrs. Corson, a native of Denmark, had married an American, better feeling would be created between the two countries because of the fame of this woman.

Congressman Emanuel Celler added the incident to his list of censorship of liberal views published in June. In September Ford herself was in London and Rome. But by October she was noted in New York talking at a race amity meeting.

Ford next appeared in February at another site for the Baháʼí Center - 119 W 57th St. Her next several appearances were in April. April also saw Ford publish another article on the Baháʼí Temple in Star of the West, which was echoed in Baháʼí World volumes 3 and 4. That September Ford returned to England for three weeks giving talks on the religion, and went further - an International Peace Congress in Antwerp and then an International Esperanto Congress in Amsterdam. Ford returned and gave roughly monthly talks in New York in October, November, and December.

January 1929 began with Ford giving a talk at the Baháʼí Center. Ford also bought a subscription to The Crisis and communicated briefly with W. E. B. DuBois. In February Ford continued her monthly talks at the Baha'i Center, and March. In April she was a guest in Geneva, New York. In May she was on a committee helping to host a "Peace Week" headed up by Edith Claire Bryce Cram of "Peace House" as well as addressing the national Baháʼí convention in support of the Baháʼí Temple, and wrote her own article covering the convention too.

Ford was seemingly quiet from July until November, perhaps in Europe, when she again is giving a talk at the Baháʼí Center. There is a break in her efforts again until February 1930 when she again gave talks at the Baha'i Center. She continued at a rate of one a month in March, and April, though in April she was also scheduled in Madison, Wisconsin. She also wrote a remembrance of her time at the exhibit of the Baha'i Temple model in New York.

She gave talks in May at the Center, and was visible as a signatory of the cablegram of New York clergy supporting peace in India with the work of Gandhi and his March Salt March. And she was noted renting an apartment from lower 2nd Ave. In June she was listed starting a series of talks in London, as well as submitted a paper to an Esperanto conference in August there. Come October Ford is back giving a talk at the Baha'i Center in New York, followed by one in November, and then by one for a race amity conference, as well as a follow-up at the Baháʼí Center in December.

January 1931 began with talks in the Baháʼí Center. After a brief lapse she was visible helping to host meetings like for the Urban League in March, as well as at the Baháʼí Center. Talks of hers continue into April.

During that Summer, her fifth in Britain, she spoke at the first public meeting of the religion in Bradford, Yorkshire. Then at the end of the summer it was noted that Ford had chaired a group bringing in a diversity of speakers "represented art, music, drama, literature, current events and world peace" to the Baháʼí Center - Jean Anthony reported presenters across about a page of text in the August edition of Baháʼí News, the national newspaper of the religion for decades. An article "The Baháʼí Temple" was published in Baháʼí World vol 3 published 1931. It includes mentions of Ford's work at the Kevorkian Gallery in New York and the Art Institute in Chicago presenting the model of the Temple (note the article itself includes an excerpt from the article "Symbolism of the Baháʼí Temple" Ford wrote).

Ford re-appeared in New York in October giving a talk at the Center, and then in November.

In New York meetings at the Baháʼí Center continued on Sundays through the year. In February Ford spoke at another reception held by the Baháʼís in honor of the National Association for the Advancement of Colored People and the New York Urban League as well as at Esperantist conferences. Additionally, still in February, Ford gave a talk in New Jersey.

In April Ford gave more than one talk at the Center. Still in April Ford was elected president of a vegetarian association in New York. In May Ford spoke at a youth conference of a church group, as well as at another church group,

The British national assembly noted that in addition to her work in America among the 17 noted Baháʼís undertaking activities to promote the religion in the UK, she was singled out as being responsible for "the most outstanding teaching activity during the year". Ford also spoke a few days after a Women's Peace Crusade at a Baháʼí follow-up.

Ford was next visible in October when she gives a series of talks at the Center in New York. In November she attended a banquet, a meeting of the All-World Gandhi Fellowship, and a gave a talk at the Center, as well as another in Yonkers. In December Ford again spoke at the Center.

== New England and the Central States in her last years ==
In January 1933 monthly talks by Ford began with a regional conference of five communities held in Yonkers, New York. In February she spoke at the Baháʼí Center, March at a chapter of the Women's International League for Peace, April to the All-Gandhi World Fellowship, and then back at the Baháʼí Center, May at the "World's Good Will Day" observance, June back at the Baháʼí Center, and in July, before going on to give talks at Green Acre later in July, and a Race Amity conference there in August, which is her last known appearance there. It was in July that she published recollections of her pilgrimage, and this race amity conference was noted in the Baháʼí News as well. In August/September attended the 1933 World Parliament of Religions. In October Ford was at the Chicago Century of Progress Exposition as one of the representatives of the national community, as well as at a local community meeting in Toledo, Ohio. In November she helped celebrate the Baháʼí Holy Day of the Birth of Baháʼu'lláh at the Baháʼí Center, and then gave a talk another day. In December she gave talks in Binghamton, New York a few nights December also saw her publish an article on a portrait of ʻAbdu'l-Baha in Star of the West, which was echoed in Baháʼí World vol 5.

Early January 1934 began with a talk at the Center, and a week later. In February Ford was with Ali Kuli Khan in Urbana, Illinois giving a series of talks, followed by a visit with a presentation in Chicago and the Temple there. In April Ford was back giving a monthly talk in the New York Baháʼí Center, then in May, and in June.

That summer Ford was visible starting with Summer School classes and talks in late June for youth in the Central States followed by a general program into July. Later Ford was in Milwaukee, Wisconsin in late September or early October, and Binghamton, New York in November for a few talks, then Syracuse, New York, before returning to New York City area and its Center before the end of November.

She doesn't appear at the New York Center after December 1934 until April 1935.

For all the remarkable coverage of decades of appearances there are no known records of her after April 1935 until her death in 1937. She probably moved to Toledo, Ohio where her daughter lived. The next entry in the Baháʼí News is notice of her death. However she had been working on a book on the religion and facing the issue of industrial work conditions. She died in Clearwater, Florida on February 2, 1937, with her daughter reporting her last words: "It is so beautiful, Lynette, it is so very beautiful."

== Legacy ==
At a memorial for her a few days later in New York Ali Kuli Khan read a cable from then head of the religion, Shoghi Effendi:

Her unique and outstanding gifts enabled her to promote effectively the best interests of the Faith in its new-born and divinely-conceived institutions. I will pray for her soul from the depths of my heart. Her services will always be remembered and extolled.

In 1944 Philip Leonard Green recalls encountering the religion by contact from Ford and her gift of her book "The World of Abdu'l-Baha".

In 1947 in Italy a niece of a lady who had met Ford in 1910 was found - she recalled her aunt, Mrs. Max Schobert, had her two talks from Ford in 1910 and then met ʻAbdu'l-Bahá.

In 1950 the Baháʼís of Washington state asked the national assembly to re-issue Ford's Oriental Rose.

In 1965 Ford's daughter Lynette Storm continued in the religion after her mother and was photographed with Margaret Ruhe commenting that her mother was at the 1893 Exposition and that she thought her mother had run into the religion there.

In 1972 an excerpt of Ford's Oriental Rose was included in Annamarie K. Hannold's Glimpig Early Baháʼí Pilgrimages.

In 1974 Bruce Whitemore published The Silent Teacher and noted her The Baháʼí Temple article in Baháʼí World vol iii.

From Marzieh Gail's 1991 book, Arches of Years, "Mrs Ford was actually a premature 'sixties person', as her life and opinions clearly show. ... She, who had known poverty herself, stood for labor and the underdog. She, an intellectual, stood for beauty, art, the life of the mind."

Ford's 1889 critique, A Feminine Iconoclast, originally published in The Nationalist was reprinted in Carol Farley Kessler's 1995 book, Daring to Dream: Utopian Fiction by United States Women Before, 1950.

== Bibliography ==
- "A Feminine Iconoclast" The Nationalist (November 1889) pages 252-7.
- The Syndicate - A comedy-drama in four acts by Mary Palmer Reese and Mary Hanford Ford (1891).
- Mary Hanford Finney Ford (1891). Which Wins?: A Story of Social Conditions. Lee and Shepard.
- Mary Hanford Ford (1895). Otto's Inspiration. S. C. Griggs.
- Mary Hanford Finney Ford (1897). The Holy Grail: The Silent Teacher. Message of the Mystics. A.B. Stockham & Company.
- Mary Hanford Finney Ford (1897). Goethe' Faust: Its Ethical Symbolism. Message of the Mystics. Alice B. Stockham & Company.
- Mary Hanford Ford (1897). Balzac's Seraphita: The Mystery of Sex. Message of the Mystics. A. B. Stockham & Company.
- Paul de Kock; trans. by Mary Hanford Ford (1904). The works of Charles Paul de Kock. The Frederick J. Quinby company.
- Mary Hanford Finney Ford (1904). The Legends of Parsifal. H.M. Caldwell Company.
- Mary Hanford Finney Ford (1910). The Oriental Rose: Or, The Teachings of Abdul Baha which Trace the Chart of "the Shining Pathway". Broadway Publishing Company.
- Mary Hanford Ford (1915–1916). The World Of Abdul-Baha (PDF) (4th ed.). JJ Little and Ives Co, New York.
- Mary Hanford Finney Ford (1933). The secret of life. San Francisco, CA: Upham & Rutledge. OCLC 17846408.
