= Baháʼí Faith in Greater Boston =

The Baháʼí Faith in Greater Boston, a combined statistical area, has had glimpses of the religion in the 19th century arising to its first community of religionists at the turn of the century. Early newspaper accounts of events were followed by papers on the precursor Bábí religion by Dr. Rev. Austin H. Wright were noted, materials donated, and lost, and then other scholars began to write about the religion.

The community began to coalesce being near to Green Acre, founded by Sarah Farmer, who publicly espoused the religion from 1901. From then on, the institution would progressively be associated with Baháʼís - a place where both locals and people from afar came to learn of the religion, and who officially took over controlling interest from 1913. Leaders rising to national prominence with a national level of organization soon arose after ʻAbdu'l-Bahá, then head of the religion, traveled through the area for about 40 days and across the United States for some 239 days. Most prominent were Harlan Ober, William Henry Randall, and Alfred E. Lunt, who served in events in the Boston area, Green Acre boards, and national institutions of the religion. In addition to national leaders in the religion, a number of notable individuals joined the religion and were increasingly visible - such as Urbain Ledoux, Sadie and Marby Oglesby, James Ferdinand Morton Jr., Nancy Bowditch, and Guy Murchie.

The community moved from beginning to host public meetings to systematically support a presence in a Center in Boston with services and presentations on the religion as well as a racially integrated community since 1935. Starting about the 1950s and broadening into the 1960s, there was wider recognition of the Baháʼís themselves. Sometimes this took the form of noting their persecution in Morocco and then Iran and other times noting local concerts and fairs with their participation. The modern community, albeit a tiny fraction of the wider population, is present in some concentrations and thin areas throughout the greater Boston area. Over the last couple of decades, it has been systematically pursuing programs of neighborhood community-building activities of study circles, children's classes, junior youth groups, and devotional meetings among the activities and observances of the religion.

== Firsts ==
=== Mention of Bábí period ===
The first mention related to the history of the Baháʼí Faith known in Massachusetts concerns news of Bábism in Qajar Persia, which Baháʼís hold as a direct precursor akin to the relationship between John the Baptist and Jesus. This was a newspaper article printed in the Boston Courier December 29, 1845, reporting on events from the previous June. It is an echo of the original published in the London Times Nov 1, 1845. This Boston mention repeated January 1846 in the Boston Evening Transcript, the Christian Witness and Church Advocate, In February in the Christian Journal out of Exeter, New Hampshire, and then again later in June 1847. In Baháʼí records this event is reported in The Dawn-Breakers following Quddús' arrival in Shiraz after the pilgrimage of the Báb. The next newspaper reference to events of this period was in November 1850, echoing newspaper articles as early as the previous July.

==== Austin Wright ====
The first "paper" on events of this period is a letter written to the American Oriental Society which was holding its meeting in Boston, and the library of materials was held at the Boston Athenæum. The letter was originally published as part of the minutes of the Society in The Literary World of June 14, 1851, as an untitled entry whose first quote is "notice of a singular character, who has for some years past played a prominent part on the stage of Persian life" dated February 10, 1851, by Dr. Rev. Austin H. Wright. It is considered the first paper to give an account on Bábism, though it makes mistakes typical of the period. See also Josephus on Jesus. It was subsequently also published in a Vermont newspaper June 26, 1851, and a translation was published in a German newspaper. Wright, father of Lucy Myers Wright Mitchell and John Henry Wright, was a medical missionary from New England to Persia among the Nestorian Christians.

Wright followed up with another paper/letter, "A short chapter in the history of Bâbeeism in Persia," to the Society published in May 1853. Donations to the Society, while mentioned in the first paper, are not listed actually being cataloged, however another donation in 1856 is noted when another set was sent. The library of materials of the period was first kept under Charles Folsom at the Boston Athenæum until 1855, then the materials were moved to New Haven and accepted at Yale University in July. The collection was dispersed and then regathered, purged and organized in 1905 by Hanns Oertel. By 1930 the only Bábí related texts in the collection were later works that had been gathered by E. G. Browne.

Wright died in what was then called Urumiah, in Qajar Persia, January 14, 1865.

==== Stephen Greenleaf Bulfinch ====
Bostonian Stephen Greenleaf Bulfinch wrote about the religion following the work of Frenchman Ernst Renan who wrote The Origins of Christianity: The Apostles in 1866. Bulfinch had been a Unitarian minister since 1830 but resigned circa 1860 when he accepted the Trinity Doctrine. Across some 11 pages, Bulfinch made comparisons between the Báb and Jesus mostly positive though he also calls the religion a "delusion".

He marks the court examination of the claims of the Báb like the examination of Jesus (suggesting the account may, in fact, have been copied), then after a while continues:

In various respects, the history of Mirza Ali Mohammed, surnamed the Báb, presents startling resemblance to that of the Savior. Claiming descent from an ancient prophet king, he was yet, like Jesus, born in a lowly station; still he was regarded by his followers as the sovereign of his nation and of mankind, whose advent had been long foretold and ardently expected. After leading a life of purity, and uttering words of wisdom, he was put to death, through the hostility of his own government, but by the hands of foreign soldiers; and, before his execution, he was denied by some of his most prominent followers; nay, the very form of contumely with which they were compelled to treat him, was the same which had been used towards the Savior in the hall of the high priest. It is high honor for a teacher of wisdom thus to bear in his own history a resemblance to that of the Redeemer and we would fain believe that Mirza Ali Mohammed was worthy of the distinction. But we cannot forget that the claim was made for him, that he was "the Gate of Truth, the Imam of Islam," the subject of ancient prophecy, the worker of present miracles, and the destined possessor of universal empire ...

==== James T. Bixby ====
Though later than the Bábí period perse, Unitarian minister born, educated, and worked often in Massachusetts, James Thompson Bixby wrote about the religion in 1897 and made a student journal of Boston College doing so. He also later lectured on the religion in 1901 at Green Acre. Bixby also turned his attention to the Baháʼí period. He published an article on the religion in August 1912 in the North American Review, after he had offered it to the Baháʼís to review. Objecting to it, an interview with ʻAbdu'l-Bahá was subsequently arranged in April 1912 and published in Star of the West in August as well.

=== Bahá´í period firsts ===
Though the religion was established in the United States before 1900, by then no more than a dozen Baháʼís were in New England. Compared to the early growth in other places, and massive growth in South Carolina decades later, the region had relatively little Millennium interests - see Second and Third Great Awakening and the Burned-over district. Nevertheless, individuals from, educated in, or lived their lives in, Greater Boston were among the first Baháʼís of the United States. At the same time, some perhaps well-meaning if inaccurate reviews or even misinformed views of the Bábist/Baháʼí views were done as early as 1900.

Thornton Chase (February 22, 1847 – September 30, 1912) was born in Springfield, Massachusetts and was a U.S. businessman and writer; he was commonly recognized as the first convert to the Baháʼí Faith of Occidental background. During his life, he organized many Baháʼí activities in Chicago and Los Angeles and is considered a prominent Baháʼí.

In 1895 Kate Ives, née Cowan, of Orleans, Massachusetts, may have been the first woman born in the United States to accept the Baháʼí Faith, and was the first Baháʼí to move to Boston in 1899.

==== Sarah Farmer, Green Acre and the first Baháʼí community of Boston ====
The Green Acre Baháʼí School is established in Eliot, Maine, at the northern edge of Greater Boston becoming an important learning center for Baháʼís and non-Baháʼís in Greater Boston and across the United States. Maria P. Wilson was in the company of Sarah Farmer on a trip overseas when they learned of the religion in 1900 from Josephine Locke and Elizabeth Knudson. Farmer was publicly linked with the religion in June 1901 after she had found truth in various religions and quasi-religious groups. But of the Baháʼí Faith, it was explained, "... she has found the common faith in which all devout souls may unite and yet be free." It was then announced Green Acre would be a place to learn of the religion, run in parallel with the other classes already established, but for free. Mírzá Abu'l-Faḍl, among the most scholarly trained Baháʼís of the time, was there. Ali Kuli Khan, to serve as his translator, arrived in the United States in June. Abu'l-Faḍl had accompanied Anton Haddad, the first Baháʼí to live in the United States, on his return trip to America. They had been sent by then head of the religion, ʻAbdu'l-Bahá. The later well-known Baháʼí Agnes Baldwin Alexander was also there. News of the Boston area community began to be noted in the newspapers. It was at these classes with Abu'l-Faḍl Mary Hanford Ford is considered to have joined the religion. Ford moved to the Boston area for a couple of years. It was not her first time in Boston. She, Ali Kuli Khan, and the Breeds, whom she introduced to the religion, were soon active as a community in Boston area. By December 1901 Baháʼís in Chicago knew she was a Baháʼí and working with Sarah Farmer on projects. Ford was noted in Boston in November 1903 giving her talk on "The Holy Grail", and news of the mistreatment of Bábís/Baha'is in Persia was noted in August 1903. Khan was soon visible living in Boston in 1904, and Khan had married Bostonian Baháʼí, Florence Breed in 1904. Alice Ives Breed, Florence's mother, originally from Pavilion, Illinois, born Jan 15, 1853, was a leading philanthropist socialite of the area. Ford would return for a talk a decade later.

Locations of early Baháʼís

Other Baháʼís noted in the period are: Oscar S. Greenleaf was the first Baha'i in Springfield, Massachusetts, Henry Goodale, and Maria P. Wilson soon moved to Boston, Massachusetts in 1902. Professional singer Mary Lucas who went on Baháʼí pilgrimage with Nathan Fitz-Gerald in January–February 1905 and meet ʻAbdu'l-Bahá, then head of the religion. Nebraskan/Illinoian Albert Ross Vail attended Harvard Divinity School, a center of Unitarian training, for 3 years. Vail studied with William James on pragmatist philosophy. In 1906, he served as president of the Unitarian student group as well as the Harvard Divinity School Unitarian Club in his final year there. It is unknown if he was ever aware of Ali Kuli Khan's appearance at Harvard as a guest of James in 1905, but he moved to Urbana, Illinois and served a Unitarian congregation near the University of Illinois at Urbana-Champaign, arriving in September 1906. The first known connection with Baháʼís is when Vail's group hosted "Amir Ullah Fareed", who was listed as a student of the Medical College of the University, and who spoke on April 28, 1907. Fareed circulated some early printed prayers visible in Boston and would serve as one of ʻAbdu'l-Bahá's translators in 1912.

== Growing community ==
After marrying in 1904, Khan gave a talk at Alice Ives Breed's home in Cambridge, Massachusetts. By 1905, regular Baháʼí meetings were established in Boston, whether in homes or in public venues. Khan was visible at a women's club meeting in March 1905 at Sewall Hall. Baháʼís began to be profiled in the news in 1909. Mary Lucas published an account of her pilgrimage in 1909. Lucas would be visible at occasional Baháʼí events until her death in 1934.

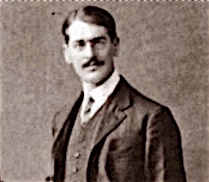
Harlan Ober in 1907

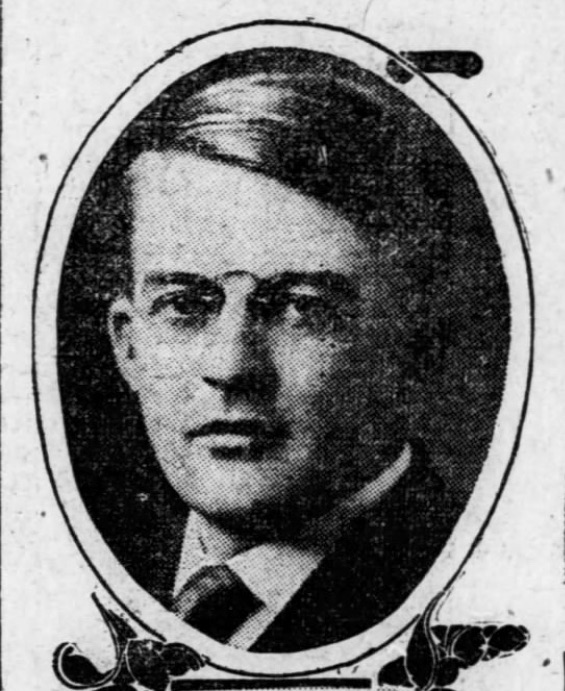
Alfred E. Lunt (1910)

Harlan Ober and Alfred E. Lunt were Bostonians who joined the religion in the summer of 1905 at Green Acre with Ober learning of the religion first through Alice Buckton, and then Lunt learned of the religion from Ober. Ober had been in shipping interests. Ober and Lunt were leaders in Republican party politics on college campuses, in the era of the Fourth Party System also known as the Progressive Era. Ober's parents lived in Beverly, Massachusetts, and Lunt was a Harvard Law school graduate. Picture of Lunt

In the summer of 1906, Stanwood Cobb learned of the religion from a series of articles in the Boston Transcript and went to Green Acre to learn more about the religion. He successively conversed with Sarah Farmer and Mary Lucas. Thornton Chase was also there giving a series of talks. It was on that occasion that Cobb joined the religion.

By the winter of 1906 Louis Bourgeois, later architect of the Baháʼí House of Worship in Wilmette, Illinois, and his wife had joined the religion after having "come into association with the Baha'i [sic] Faith through Marie Watson and Mary Hanford Ford." Khan and his family went on Baháʼí pilgrimage in 1906.

Circa early 1907 or late 1906, Ober went on Baháʼí pilgrimage and was asked to go with Hooper Harris on a trip to India promulgating the religion, an effort noted as lasting "... no less than seven months, in India and Burma, visiting Bombay, Poona, Lahore, Calcutta, Rangoon, and Mandalay." ʻAbdu'l-Bahá's guidance to them amounted to behaving very differently than Christian missionaries. Ober returned and was visible at Green Acre late summer of 1907. Ober went on a second pilgrimage in May 1909 with the MacNutt family and others. One early joke in the history of the religion comes from Ober about whether he was going to India or America ...

One day in the Holy Land He told Harlan Ober, an American Baháʼí, that he was to go to India. Harlan Ober did travel far and wide in the interests of the Faith, but at that particular time he did not cherish making that journey. A few days later ʻAbdu'l-Bahá told him to go to America. "But Master," Ober said, "I thought I was going to India." "So did Christopher Columbus," ʻAbdu'l-Bahá replied.

Lunt continued to be active in Republican politics in 1908 and was visible at Green Acre in 1909.

The Khans returned and he was visible in Boston by 1908. That year, the first Baháʼí governing board was elected, the forerunner of the first Local Spiritual Assembly of Boston. The community sent a delegate to the first national convention in 1909, and the existence of the community was noted in a national journal. The first known meeting in a public meeting space was held on November 7, 1909. The following were present: Harriet Sprague, Lily Ostburg, Frances Godard, Helen Campbell, Francis Harding, Anise Rideout, Julia Culver, Raffie Esphahani, Althea Dorr, George Ostburg, Maria P. Wilson, Alice Ives Breed. On March 24, 1910, the assembly was composed of: officers Harlan Ober, Grace Robarts, Julia Culver, George Ostburg, and members Mrs. H. Sprague; Mrs. F. Goddard, Alice Ives Breed, Helen Campbell, and Mrs. E. Flees. Notable speakers at events in the Boston community included Stanwood Cobb, Lua Getsinger, and Edna McKinney.

Khan was then appointed Iranian Charge D'Affaires in Washington D. C. in 1910.

In 1911 Lunt was visible as a solicitor for Beverly, Mass., member of the national executive board of the Baháʼís, and participating in a Bostonian Baháʼí Naw-Rúz commemoration with guests.

Fannie Fern Andrews of Boston was the second vice president of the Persian Educational Society in 1912 with strong connections to the religion.

=== ʻAbdu'l-Bahá in the area ===
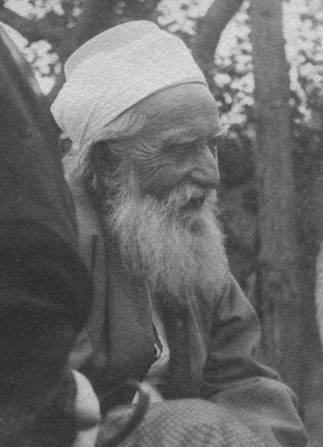
ʻAbdu'l-Bahá, during his trip to the United States

ʻAbdu'l-Bahá, then head of the religion, embarked on travels to the West following release from imprisonment and was anticipated to come to Boston.

==== Arrival in United States ====
Before coming to Boston, on 23 April 1912, ʻAbdu'l-Bahá attended several events. One was a reception in Washington D. C. by the Persian Charge D'Affaires Ali Kuli Khan, and the Turkish Ambassador; at this reception ʻAbdu'l-Bahá moved the place-names such that the only African-American present, Louis G. Gregory, was seated at the head of the table next to himself, an event that was highly noted at the time and since. One of the early versions of the story of this event was told by Harlan Ober.

Newspaper reporters in Boston asked ʻAbdu'l-Bahá why he had come to America, and he stated that he had come to participate in conferences on peace and that just giving a warning messages is not enough. A full page summary of the religion was printed in the New York Times. A booklet on the religion was published late April out of Boston.

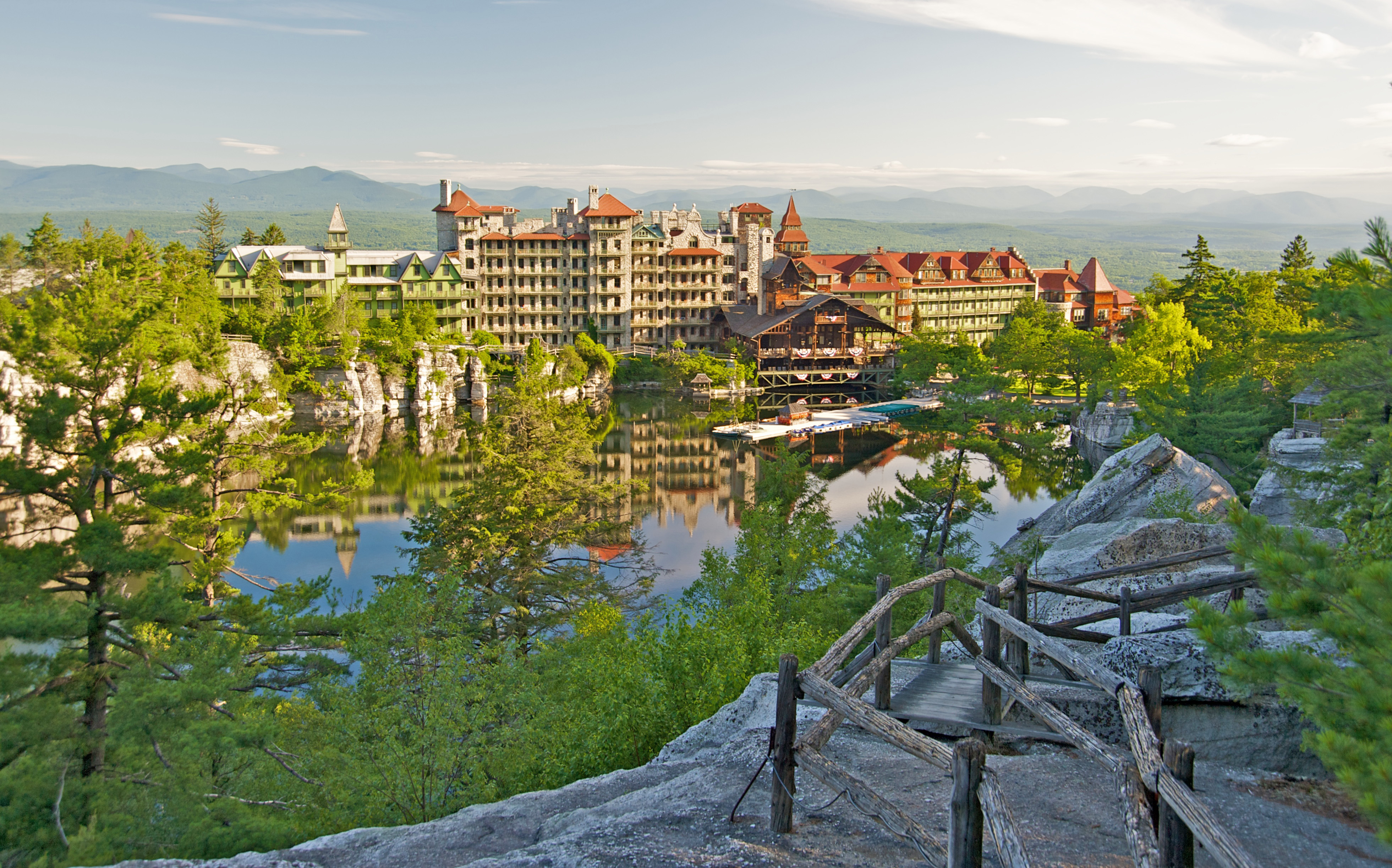
Mohonk Mountain House, a resort hotel located on the Shawangunk Ridge

On 14 May ʻAbdu'l-Bahá went to northern New York state to Lake Mohonk addressing the Lake Mohonk Conference on International Arbitration and stayed at the Mohonk Mountain House.

His talk was covered by many publications including one from Boston, and began

When we consider history, we find that civilization is progressing, but in this century its progress cannot be compared with that of past centuries. This is the century of light and of bounty. In the past, the unity of patriotism, the unity of nations and religions was established; but in this century, the oneness of the world of humanity is established; hence this century is greater than the past.

Harlan Ober and Grace Robarts (who had learned of the religion from Lua Getsinger,) were married in July 1912 with ʻAbdu'l-Bahá attending. Grace served as housekeeper and hostess for ʻAbdu'l-Bahá during his journeys in America.

==== First Boston visit ====
ʻAbdu'l-Bahá left New York City on the 22nd of May for Boston where he would be for four days. On the evening of his arrival, he addressed a Unitarian convention, then went on. There was an audience of some three thousand including hundreds of Unitarian ministers. On the 23rd he visited a Greek-Syrian relief agency, a special meeting at the University of Worcester, Massachusetts, and a party for his birthday was held during which he spoke of the importance of the Báb though he also lamented the cake, which had flags of United States, Persia, and the UK, wasn't big enough to hold flags from all countries. On the 24th, he met with individuals, a talk before some Unitarians, another in Brookline, and then a talk at the home of a Baháʼí. On the 25th, he met with individuals. Sometime during this visit is the incident where William Randall delivered grape juice for ʻAbdu'l-Bahá.

==== Second Boston visit ====
ʻAbdu'l-Bahá arrived for the second time in Boston on July 23 but sent most of the entourage ahead to Dublin, NH. That evening, he addressed an audience at a hotel as well as a later one in the home of the Breeds. On the 24th, he spoke with individual visitors and for a talk before a club. Some from the club followed him back from that talk, and on return, there was also a line of people waiting for him at the hotel that evening. He also spoke to the Boston Theosophical Society. On the 25th, he met with individuals before he left for Dublin.

==== Dublin, NH ====
From July 26 to August 16, he was in Dublin. He often met with individuals and small groups or made short trips to visit nearby Baha'is and a camp for youth. He also carried on corresponding through letter across the United States and Europe. One evening he announced the betrothal of Louis G. Gregory and Louisa Mathew and astonished the crowd. Elders with ear trumpets listened. Once he took his Persian entourage aside and spoke comparing feasts of kings that were brilliant but had no enthusiasm while there they ate modestly and in hard circumstances, or so it seemed, but everywhere there was real enthusiasm of the heart. On August 11, he was noted speaking to a local Unitarian church with answers to questions of such length and detail that it was claimed he must have memorized the answers beforehand. He compared his yearning to see the audience to the Apostles that traveled far to see people. From there, he left for Green Acre on August 16.

==== Green Acre ====
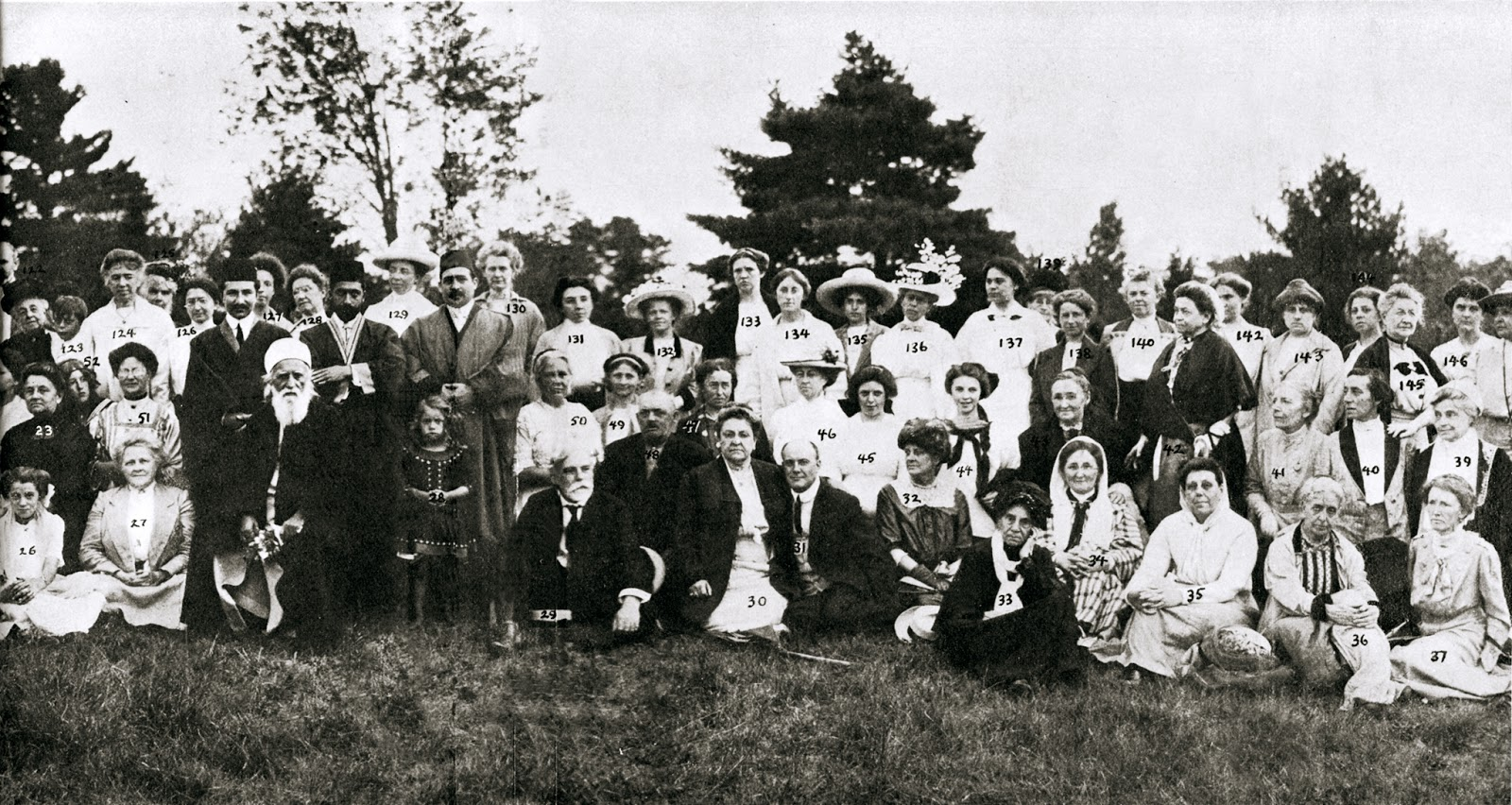
Photograph of Abdul-Baha visiting Green Acre, United States, in 1912

He then went to Eliot, Maine from 16 to 23 Aug, where he stayed in Green Acre. Some five or eight hundred people were there to hear the first talk. The talk was about ways of knowing the truth - he disavowed individual approaches like pure reason, simple authority, individual inspiration, etc., but affirmed:

[A] statement presented to the mind accompanied by proofs which the senses can perceive to be correct, which the faculty of reason can accept, which is in accord with traditional authority and sanctioned by the promptings of the heart, can be adjudged and relied upon as perfectly correct, for it has been proved and tested by all the standards of judgment and found to be complete.

Some in the audience repudiated their former beliefs of inspiration as pure truth. At other talks, audience members wept during his prayers or fainted. He spoke to a girls club camp group by the river on August 19.

Fred Mortensen arrived August 20. Mortensen had been a criminal that fled arrest - his lawyer was Baháʼí Albert Hall of Minnesota from whom he learned of the religion. Mortensen rode trains from Minneapolis to Cleveland and on to Green Acre - all by way of Freighthopping. Being introduced in a crowd, he was embarrassed at his dirty appearance and then was told to sit down amid the company of people in fine dress and wait, but soon ʻAbdu'l-Bahá returned and began to speak closely with Mortensen. His inquiry revealed how Mortisen had traveled and Mortisen felt kindness from ʻAbdu'l-Bahá. Mortisen had arrived on a day ʻAbdu'l-Baha had arranged as a feast. On the last day at Green Acre he met with individuals and left on the 23rd.

==== Malden, Massachusetts ====
His final destination in New England was Malden, Massachusetts at the home of Maria P. Wilson, originally of Boston, where he stayed from 23 to 29 August. In Malden, he spoke to various groups - a New Thought movement, a women's suffrage group, a metaphysical thought group, and a theosophical group. He also attended a marriage ceremony of Clarence Johnson and Ruby Breed, daughter of Alice Breed and sister to Florence Breed Khan.

Albert Vail accompanied William H. Randall meeting ʻAbdu'l-Bahá there in late August. Vail would later mark this as a pivotal point for his life but at first, he didn't remark on it publicly. Later he said:

Six years ago I met a servant of God named Abdul Baha, so universal in mind, brilliant in utterance, so pure, so radiant with universal love, so majestic in the power of his holy spirit that I became convinced he and his equally perfect and glorious father, Baha o'llah, were God's own messengers of light and salvation to our modern world ...

ʻAbdu'l-Bahá then left for Montreal, arriving near midnight on 30 August 1912.

=== After effects of the visit ===
A number of individuals and institutions became more prominent after ʻAbdu'l-Bahá's travels through the region.

==== Albert Vail ====
As early as January 1913, Albert Vail, then a Unitarian Minister, was visibly promulgating the religion, and was listed as the delegate to the "Bahai Temple Unity" national convention from the Urbana Baháʼí community. He reported on developments in Urbana, Illinois of study of the Baháʼí teachings and seems to quote the Writings saying: "It is remarkable to observe how the Spirit seems to catch and hold one, and the whole life seems set aflame as to the Truth. There is a mystery, a force in the Cause far above the ken of men and angels." and then spoke with an eloquence that moved and thrilled the audience. In a separate account of the convention, it was noted he was the final speaker of the meeting and that his "discourse was unique in penetrating power and beauty of utterance among all the eloquent addresses of the Convention" and that the chair had stopped reviewing the watch to limit speakers. Both accounts lamented that the speech was not written down, but one said it traced the proofs of Manifestation, noting the martyrdoms of Persia, the need for divine authority to solve human problems, and the lives of the Central Figures of the Faith.

Vail was officially recognized to have joined the religion years later, after the majority of his congregation insisted he stop promoting the religion.

==== Green Acre and contributing to the national leadership ====
In the summer of 1913, Baháʼís felt the strength of organization to attempt to win control of the board of Green Acre. Following this, Kate Ives, the first Baháʼí of Boston, wrote a letter to the editor inviting Portsmouth residents to a talk on the religion. In 1914, Alfred E. Lunt was Secretary of the annual convention to elect the national leadership and was himself then elected along with William Henry Randall.

In Spring 1915 Baháʼís gathered for the Panama–Pacific International Exposition - among them were Harlan Ober and Alfred E. Lunt. ʻAbdu'l-Bahá wrote a letter about Expo thanking those that gathered. Following this, Randall and Ober and others were visible at Green Acre. Sarah Farmer changed her will to bequeath Green Acre to the Baháʼís in the event of her death and her family involuntarily committed her to a mental institution - in 1915, Randall lead the idea of rescuing her executed in combination by Randal, Ledoux, and Montford Mills, ultimately gathering a chief of police and a judge to accompany a court order to effect her freedom. Meanwhile, Lunt again served on the national board of Baháʼís this time as president, with Ober as secretary. Meanwhile, Ober wrote a letter to the editor of the Boston Post about the religion and Green Acre. Farmer died, shortly after being released, in 1916. Kate Ives read the eulogy, and attending were Lunt, Ober, and Randall, and others from Boston and the area. Ober was noted as an officer of Green Acre along with Lunt.

The Baháʼís held meetings for the 1917 national convention at Green Acre and Boston.

===== Alfred E. Lunt =====
Lunt was on the summer schedule at Green Acre in 1917, and performed a funeral program there in July 1918. Lunt gave a series of talks in Chicago in May 1919, as well as on the question of the minimum wage in 1922.

Lunt was noted on the board of trustees of Green Acre 1925, and served on the national assembly in 1928. In 1930 Lunt gave a talk in New York, and published "The Supreme Affliction: A Study in Baháʼí Economics and Socialization". Lunt was at a Temple dedication in 1931. In 1937, Lunt was visible giving a talk in New York again.

===== William Randall =====
In 1917 Randall was noted speaking in Montreal in March. Randall was again elected to the national board, and that year he was elected as president of the board. Randall was again elected, this time as national treasurer, in 1918. In 1919, Randall accompanied Vail on pilgrimage and his account was read verbatim to the national convention in the United States. He was listed as the contact for announcing events and reserving rooms at Green Acre in 1920 by Albert Vail.

Randall was appointed to the supervisory board of the Baháʼí periodical Star of the West in 1922, and contributed an article on Green Acre. In 1923, he was noted as chairman of the board of Green Acre while continuing as treasurer for the national community for the newly designated National Spiritual Assembly. In 1925, it was announced the administrative offices of the religion would be run from Green Acre.

Randall also took part in the 1928 Race Amity Convention held at Green Acre. Perhaps Randall's final appearance was August 1928 at a commemoration of the visit of ʻAbdu'l-Bahá to Green Acre.

Randall died February 11, 1929, and a cable from Shoghi Effendi, then head of the religion, stated: "Grief stricken passing Harry Randall. Distinguished and Beloved Servant of Baháʼu'lláh. Assure family and friends fervent prayers, heartfelt condolences in behalf Holy Leaves and myself. Hold befitting Memorials -signed Shoghi."

===== The Obers =====
Harlan Ober was elected to the national executive board in 1917, and was at the 1919 national convention held in New York at which the Tablets of the Divine Plan, a series of letters about promulgating the religion intra-and-internationally following World War I were officially presented, following which he gave a talk at a Chicago meeting in May. Letters suggesting that Baháʼís take up "deeds, not words" following the Red Summer (1919) race riots arrived at Ober and soon there were Race Amity Conventions.

In 1920 Ober was present in Syria for the Knighting of ʻAbdu'l-Bahá. Randall was elected to the national board again in 1920 as treasurer and addressed the convention.

In 1928 Ober gave a talk in Brooklyn, and Grace hosted an evening social at Green Acre. Ober gave a talk in Pittsburgh, Pennsylvania in 1929. In 1930 Ober returned to Pennsylvania to give another talk, and was also noticed in Brooklyn.

1931 Ober was with Louis Gregory for a talk.

The Ober family purchased a home near Green Acre in 1932 and Harlan soon was reading on the radio at WHEB weekly after noon from Spring into the Fall from 1933 into 1935,(with occasional gaps.) Grace spoke at the Portsmouth chapter of Hadassah and Harlan was also visible at other events - a funeral, and several series of talks in 1933. In 1933, he also gave a program series on "Psychology and Life" for Alpha Beta sorority and a ladies club.

In November 1934, Ober gave a talk in Eliot for the Christian Endeavor Society, a Zeta Alpha Men's Club of a Baptist church. The family wintered in New York to February 1935, and their college student daughter visited them in the summer of 1935.

Ober was a substitute speaker in January 1936 at Green Acre, and lead a funeral there.

Grace died immediately after giving a talk at the Chicago Baha'i national convention in April 1938 - Harlan was then serving on the national spiritual assembly after traveling in Louisville, Kentucky. Harlan gave his next talk at Green Acre that July, (noted as a radio personality too,) toured universities in December 1938, and served on the Green Acre summer committee for the school in 1939. That fall he was in the Golden Gate International Exposition in October with Louis G. Gregory, and spoke at an evening meeting. In 1940 he gave a talk at the Baháʼí Temple, and was again elected to the national assembly.

In 1941 he is noted among the Green Acre management for the National Spiritual Assembly of the United States and Canada (as it was then). Their son married at the later summer. In July 1942 he gives talk at Green Acre, followed by a series of talks.

He was in a Green Acre race Amity meeting in August 1942, and directly after was at a general session at Green Acre.

Ober was one among several present in a 1943 series of talks at Green Acre. A 1944 series included Ober and Bostonian Nancy Bowditch and he gave a later series at Portsmouth Baháʼí Center.

In 1945 Ober took a trip to Montana, where he gave a talk, Ottawa in 1946, and tried to make an impression on Prince Edward Island (without much success). In 1947, he was in Utah giving a talk.

He stayed home in the summer of 1951, and officiated at funeral of Louis G. Gregory, which he followed up with a series of talks at Green Acre as well as other opportunities. For a few years, the public mentions of him are a couple of funerals he oversaw, but in 1956 he gave a series of talks.

In the summer of 1961, a Baháʼí pioneer met Ober, who was on a trip in Africa at the time.

=== Some individuals ===
==== Nancy Bowditch ====
Also known as Mrs. Harold Bowditch, (July 4, 1890 – May 1, 1979,) Nancy was the daughter of George de Forest Brush who was active in Dublin, New Hampshire as well as Europe.

The Brush family interacted with ʻAbdu'l-Bahá and the Baháʼís while in Dublin in July and August 1912, especially during an annual out-of-doors play as well as a visit to their farm, but her first husband died unexpectedly in September. Nancy moved from place to place until she married Harvard graduate Dr. Harold Bowditch October 1916.

Bowditch became more involved with costume work for theatre productions. While her life was going well she also felt "something was wanting in my existence and couldn't put a finger on ... I then began to seek for that missing link, going to most every church and attending various meetings ... (and) hearing of a meeting to be held in Boston about the Baháʼí Faith."

I'll never forget entering the large hall and seeing around me such a different type of gathering from the usual Boston crowd. Here were both rich and poor, along with every race. Many were black. I listened to a wonderful talk on the Faith by Mr. Harry Randall and was so thrilled! Afterwards I made my way straight to the table where books were being sold in order to learn more about the subject. I picked out as many as could be comfortably carried home on the streetcar, then found to my dismay that I didn't have enough money with which to pay for them! The person at the book stand told me it was all right to take them home and pay at the next meeting.

This may have been an event the Boston Baháʼí community hosted called a "World Unity Conference" as part of a series sponsored by the National Spiritual Assembly of the Baháʼís of the United States and covered in the Boston Evening Transcript. Randall helped organize and spoke at it. She then credits Randall, Louise Drake Wright and her sister Mrs. George Nelson as aiding her inquiry into the religion while she read books like Baháʼu'lláh and the New Era. She officially joined the religion in 1929. She was visible in the 1930 Race Amity Convention held at Green Acre, and left on Baháʼí pilgrimage in late March 1931 with her then 19 yr. old daughter. They spent three weeks in the area of Haifa and left by way of Jerusalem taking in Christian paths of pilgrimage. She then attended the 1931 national convention reporting on events in Boston as the Chair of the Boston Assembly. She wrote of her pilgrimage in Star of the West in July 1931, and spoke of it in August.

She would continue working with the religion with occasional gaps in public mention. In 1948 she was listed as the corresponding secretary of the Baháʼí group of Brookline, Massachusetts,

The Bowditch's moved to Peterborough, New Hampshire in the south of the state in 1959, and attended the 1963 Baháʼí World Congress with a granddaughter, and in 1965 Nancy is pictured on the first local Spiritual Assembly.

Harold died in August 1964 and their home at 12 Pine Street became the official Baháʼí Center of the community in 1967 at which Guy Murchie gave a talk for the opening ceremony.

In 1970 she was at the official presentation of a Baháʼí book to then Governor Walter R. Peterson Jr. and published a book on her father.

1972 she was noted for a Portsmouth Friends of the Library, spoke at Meriden Connecticut on her memory of meeting ʻAbdu'l-Bahá, and aided in costumes for play at Keene State College.

==== Urbain Ledoux ====
Urbain J. Ledoux, (August 13, 1874 – April 8, 1941,) later known as "Mr. Zero", referring to his not wanting his own name to be prominent, was motivated early in his quest of service to humanity. After various stages of a career of service to others he reached the stage of a career diplomat. His approach of advocating for business development as a means to promote the interests of humanity was challenged, that it would be fruitless for higher aims unless personal transformation were brought to bear. He quit the diplomatic service and sought to work with non-governmental organizations for both business and peace interests. Soon he was working with the Baháʼís and present during the conflict over the status of Sarah Farmer as noted above. After that he then began to found institutions seeking to aide humanity, making news first with the unemployment after the First World War among workers and veterans with a breadline in 1919.

He advocated for the Baháʼí Faith but was often misunderstood, though he did so with a limited understanding of the principles of the religion and proceeded to set up events aimed at raising awareness of the suffering of the unemployed in New York and Boston. His efforts were seen as too confrontational and his events were repeatedly shut down even when he sought to be less confrontational and have discussions with leaders. The work was renewed with greater intensity during the Great Depression but he was in his 60s already and died soon after. Some of his work and antics were recorded in pictures and newsreels. He died in 1941.

==== Sadie and Marby Oglesby ====
African-Americans Sadie (April 10, 1881 - Feb 1956) and Marby Oglesby (January 14, 1870 - May 19, 1945) became interested in the religion in 1913, joined it in 1917, were visible in newspapers giving talks on the religion since the 1920s through most of their lives, and Sadie went on Baháʼí pilgrimage in March 1927 during which race issues were a prominent part of the conversations and that Sadie should take a more engaged effort towards encouraging whites towards that unity as well as blacks. Sadie was the third black pilgrim, the first black woman, the first black pilgrim to meet Shoghi Effendi as head of the religion. Mabry was a railroad Pullman porter and president of the Boston chapter of the Brotherhood of Sleeping Car Porters in 1936. Sadie also worked and taught as a nurse. The couple had married in Washington DC in 1901 Both were also elected to the Boston Spiritual Assembly over many years where Sadie often served as secretary and occasionally as treasurer. Louis G. Gregory commented that the Boston Baháʼí community was integrated by 1935 with a large proportion being colored and largely through the work of Sadie.

==== James Ferdinand Morton ====
Beginning in 1907 James Ferdinand Morton, (October 18, 1870 – October 7, 1941,) published a series of articles under "Fragments of a Mental Autobiography" in a journal named Libra which outlines his religious background beginning with Baptist family heritage, goes through Unitarian relatives, and Theosophy exploration, (he was president of the Boston Theosophical Society in 1895) and placing Jesus and the Buddha among those on the highest level of his admiration even if he found fault with all scripture and organized religion. In this period Morton was an avid "evangelist" atheist, and often spoke out against religion, but he had already encountered the Baháʼí Faith which:

At first, I regarded it with amused interest, as one of many little cults; but gradually I found myself drawn into closer and closer relation with it. There was a wideness in its attitude which I had not found elsewhere. It held place for what was best in Christianity, Judaism, Mohammedanism, Buddhism, Freethought and all the rest, warring with none of these, but finding each of them definitely serviceable to the larger spiritual plan of the universe. It is the great reconciler and harmonizer. I have discovered in it an abiding-place which I had sought in vain for many restless years. It increases, rather than decreases, my eagerness to continue the investigation of truth without bias, and to labor energetically in all branches of human service. I have no fault to find with the differing conclusions of other truth-lovers, and am ready to work with them all as occasion offers. (near 1910)

He became a convert to the religion in later life. Morton is visibly in Baháʼí circles from 1915 on the program of presenters at Green Acre.

=== Progress of the local community ===
In 1913 the Boston Baháʼí community rented a room on Huntington Avenue for its weekly public meetings followed in 1914 when it moved to the S.S. Pierce building in Copley Square.

In 1917 greater Boston communities were noted sending delegates to the national convention: a combined Beverly-Salem MA delegation (Clarence H. Lunt, Edw. D. Struven), Boston proper (W. H. Randall, A. W. Randall), Cambridge (M. A. Doer), Dublin, NH (Frank A. Chant, Leona St. C Barnitz), Eliot, ME (Kate C. Ives), and Worcester, MA (Howard Stuven, Helen C Greene).

News of the survival of ʻAbdu'l-Bahá near the end of World War I made the Boston Post, October 1918.

In 1919 the Boston Baháʼí community rented a twelve-room house at 120 Charles St. which continued in early 1920. In July a meeting was held at Hotel Victoria. Baháʼí pilgrims returning by the end of the year were noted in the Boston Post included Mrs. C H Cooper., H. S. Goodall, and A. J. Frankland. By early 1921 a more sustained series of meetings are held at Chauncy Hall at 585 Boylston St, (former home of local suffrage meetings,) Sunday evenings. And there was December coverage of the death of ʻAbdu'l-Bahá in neighboring Fritchburg.

In 1926 the Boston Baháʼí community hosted a "World Unity Conference" as noted above where Nancy Bowditch learned of the religion. The first day long meeting was held at Steinert Hall, the second at the Second Unitarian Church, and third at the Church of the Redemption where Randall chaired the day.

In 1939 Louise Erickson took a trip around New England promoting the religion.

In 1940 the Local Spiritual Assembly of Boston was incorporated, and the community held its own "Race Unity Day" in 1945.

In 1950 the Boston Baháʼí Center was established at 116 Commonwealth Avenue and a regional conference was held August 1951 in Fritchburg with Baháʼís from the region and beyond. In March/April 1952 the Baháʼí Spiritual Assembly of Boston was interviewed for the show "Our Believing World" on station WBZ-TV.

==== Guy Murchie ====
Guy Murchie (Jr.), (25 January 1907 - 8 July 1997,) the son of Ethel A. and Guy Murchie Sr. Sr Murchie was close to President Theodore Roosevelt such that while sitting as president Theodore Roosevelt and his wife attended Guy Jr.'s christening. Guy Jr was raised as an Episcopalian, attended Kent School, which at the time was just "for Boys", graduated from Harvard in 1929. Murchie's interest in the Baháʼí Faith began when he was tasked with writing an article about the Baháʼí House of Worship in Wilmette, Illinois around 1938, and then officially joined the religion 1939. He had been impressed with the unique qualities of the temple being a blend of east and west styles, and extended his interest when his insights of the biological unity of humanity was raised to a spiritual affirmation. In 1946 Murchie and then wife Barbara Cooney moved to Pepperell, Massachusetts and worked with the high school. though Cooney and Murchie divorced in 1947. In 1954 Murchie toured Iran visiting several sites holy to Baháʼís. Diary notes of his travels became the basis of a series of articles in the 1960s and later. But starting in 1955 he began to be more public with his choice of religion - several news stories in the wider media noted it which were closely followed by Baháʼís. However it wasn't until the passing of his father in 1958 that he became even more public - not least was his own public statement in 1958 in the Chicago Tribune "I am a Baháʼí".

==== Matthew Bullock Sr ====
Matthew Washington Bullock (September 11, 1881 in Dabney, North Carolina - December 17, 1972, Detroit, Michigan) rose to distinction in many fields mostly in the greater Boston area for much of his life, and many of them with instances of racism in opposition to his life and skill, through which he persevered as a pioneer for justice and humanity. He began with American football playing and coaching achieving firsts, degrees from Dartmouth(1904) and Harvard Law School,(1907) service in Morehouse College and Alabama A & M University and during World War I, then on various appointed positions in Massachusetts State government totaling some 26 years, most notably the State Parole Board including 5 years as its chair, was locally and then nationally known as a member of the National Urban League and the leadership of the Massachusetts Bar Association. While several of these were ongoing he joined the Bahá'í Faith in 1940 after membership in different Christian Churches. Without electioneering in Bahá'í administration, in a decade and a year after serving on the Boston Bahá'í Spiritual Assembly and the Regional Teaching Committee he was elected to the National Spiritual Assembly of the Bahá'ís of the United States. On his second term, after pilgrimage and taking part in the Intercontinental Bahá'í Conference in Uganda, being of service in Africa and the dedication of the Bahá'í House of Worship in Wilmette, he resigned along with many of his co-members to pioneer during the Ten Year Crusade for which he was named a Knight of Bahá'u'lláh because he chose a virgin territory. After returning home he undertook tours in the North and South in America promoting the religion, a final year of service with state government, and then was given two honorary degrees - first from Harvard Law School and second from Dartmouth College. He's buried in Boston.

=== Increasing recognition ===
In 1960 Hand of the Cause, a prominent and renowned Baháʼí, Amatu'l-Baha Ruhiyyih Khanum visited the Boston Baháʼí community and offered several talks during her visit.

The Harvard Crimson's first article noting the religion seems to have been concerning the Baháʼí persecution in Morocco, followed by notice of Harvard Baháʼís attending the first Baháʼí World Congress, both in 1963, including Sam McClellan, nephew of Albert Vail.

In 1965 the first assembly is noted in Fitchburg.

In 1966 another regional conference held.

In 1967 the Boston Baháʼís move their Center to 40 St. Botolph Street.

Boston College had a class on the religion circa 1968.

Quiet since 1963, the Harvard Crimson's next mention of the religion was in 1970. It was followed up in 1971 and 1973.

A number of Portsmouth New Hampshire Baháʼís - Mr. and Mrs. Daniel Milden with children Steve and Laugel, Elizabeth Frazier and Ruth Silva - left to attend a conference of Baháʼís in South Carolina in Spring 1970 right at the beginning of a period of intense growth of the religion there.

Local Unitarian Universalist held a meeting on the religion in 1971 and Dwight W. Allen, then of the University of Massachusetts School of Education, was among speakers on the religion.

In 1974 local 'Old Ipswich Days' fair of Ipswich, Massachusetts had Baháʼí participants, while Baháʼís Seals and Crofts played at the Boston Music Hall in March.

In 1977 the Boston Baháʼí Center established a lending library as well as regular programming for children and collective activities to promote awareness of the religion.

Circa 1983 the Harvard-Radcliffe Baháʼí Association (college club) was noted having 12 members. The club was more profiled in 1987.

In 1986 the city council of Cambridge and Mayor released a proclamation recommending that the whole city read and take to heart: The Promise of World Peace, written by the Universal House of Justice, then and current head of the religion. An article also ran in The Heights profiling a college student from Iran at Boston College, and a campus meeting about the religion.

In 1988 the national assembly of the United States picked Boston among its four foci for expansion of the religion and a conference of some 800 Baháʼís gathered.

In 1990 the Boston Baháʼís move their Center to 495 Columbus Avenue and it is moved again in 1993 to its current location at 595 Albany Street.

== Modern community ==
In the 1990s, Baháʼís attending Harvard were occasionally noted in The Harvard Crimson, whether commenting about issues on campus, or being profiled about the persecution of Baháʼís in Iran. In 2002, Baháʼí words were included in a 9/11 commemoration on campus. In 2004, a student who had converted in high school during a year abroad in the Czech Republic was profiled in The Harvard Crimson. In 2005, the Baha'i association co-sponsored "Belief in Action", a day devoted to service projects, and also supported interfaith discussions. In 2006, without referencing the Baháʼí club, campus groups turned out in support of an Iran Freedom Concert on the Harvard campus, and noted a number issues related to the Baháʼí Institute for Higher Education, in Iran. Baháʼís were noted as Abrahamic in 2006. The club was again profiled by The Harvard Crimson in 2007, when it was only six members and two overseas, reporting that it was still active in supporting interfaith events. In 2011, Rainn Wilson's support of events related to freedom of education in Iran, including the Baháʼí Institute for Higher Education, was noted on the Harvard campus.

From 1996 to the present, the Greater Boston Baháʼí community adopted a systematic approach to grassroots community development taking root in Baháʼí communities all over the world, based around four core activities: study circles, children's classes, junior youth groups, and devotional meetings.

In 2008, the Boston Baháʼí community participated in the Stamford, Connecticut regional conferences convened by the Baháʼí Universal House of Justice. In 2011 and 2012, Boston University and MIT were among the cites for a campaign about the barriers to college education in Iran, to which the Baháʼí Institute for Higher Education was a response. A youth regional conference was also held in 2013. The reformed Race Amity Convention system was re-established by the National Center for Race Amity starting in 2010, which helped establish the Masschusettes observance of Race Amity Day in 2015, and its continued observance, as well as a nationally telecast documentary on positive race relations, An American story : Race Amity and the other tradition and another project of conferences in Tennessee, Texas, and Georgia, and a youtube channel.

=== Demographics ===
There is no county approaching 1% Baháʼís in the region but there are more Baháʼís per capita in southern New Hampshire. less in Massachusetts, Within that broad pattern there are significant variations - counties where the county level per capita count of Baháʼís is several times above or below the average. In Franklin County, Massachusetts and Hampshire County, Massachusetts there are 5x higher concentration of Baháʼís than that state's average, and down to Bristol County, Massachusetts and Plymouth County, Massachusetts at about half the average. On one end of the greater area, for Rhode Island, per capita Baháʼí counts range from a bit above Rhode Island average in Newport, Rhode Island, to a low in Bristol County, Rhode Island at half that state's average. And on the other end of the greater area in southern New Hampshire, per capita Baháʼí counts range from a high in Belknap County, New Hampshire to a low of near a third of that in Rockingham County, New Hampshire.

In Massachusetts, in addition to Boston, today there are Local Spiritual Assemblies, the local administrative body, in Brookline, Cambridge, Malden, Medford, Newton, Somerville, Waltham, and Watertown.

== See also ==
- Baháʼí Faith in North America
- Baháʼí Faith in South Carolina
- Religion in Massachusetts, Boston(1), Boston(2)
- Alex Rocco, a Baháʼí actor from Boston area who found the religion when in California.
