= Sadie and Mabry Oglesby =

American Baháʼí African American couple

Sadie Oglesby (April 10, 1881, Concord NC – Feb 1956, Boston, MA) and Mabry Oglesby (January 14, 1870, South Carolina – May 19, 1945, Boston, MA) were early African American Baháʼís. The couple married in October 1901 and became interested in the Baháʼí Faith in 1913, subsequently joining the religion in 1917. Mabry was visible in newspaper coverage first as a Baháʼí from 1920. Mabry was a railroad Pullman porter all his life and president of the Boston chapter of the Brotherhood of Sleeping Car Porters in 1936. Sadie went on Baháʼí pilgrimage and met Shoghi Effendi, then head of the Baháʼí Faith, in March 1927. Issues of race were a prominent part of the conversations during the pilgrimage in addition to conversations regarding Sadie taking a more engaged effort in encouraging whites toward race unity as well as blacks. Sadie was the third black pilgrim, the first black woman pilgrim, and the first black pilgrim to meet Shoghi Effendi as head of the religion. Following this experience, Sadie devoted her later years to giving talks and urging Baháʼís towards the race unity that Shoghi Effendi called for. Sadie had also worked and taught as a nurse. The Oglesbys were both elected to the Boston Spiritual Assembly where Sadie often served as secretary and occasionally as treasurer. Prominent Baháʼí Louis G. Gregory commented that the Boston Baháʼí community was integrated by 1935 with a large proportion being colored and largely through the work of Sadie.

== Shankles of NC ==
The US Census records for 1910, 1920, and 1930 show that Sadie E J Oglesby and her parents were from North Carolina and was a nurse; in fact she was a head nurse in later years. She was, indeed, a nurse back in North Carolina. Nurse S E J Shankle had three newspaper articles mentioning her as a colored nurse doing fundraising for a colored hospital in Pinehurst/Southern Pines and she actively sought contributions from white people to support the colored hospital for sufferers of "consumption" (tuberculosis).

She came from the wealthy colored Shankle family from near Concord, a place sometimes called Shankletown. The patriarch of the family was Whit Shankle. He had made news back in 1890 with his mule at the county fair. Sadie lost a brother in a mine explosion in Chatham County in 1895. In a few years she would lose a sister, and her father in 1903. Sadie was born April 10, 1881.

Sadie Oglesby was trained as a nurse at the Dixie Training School for Nurses. Sadie does not appear in any Shaw University records of the 1890s.

== Oglesby in SC ==
The 1910, 1920, 1930 and 1940 US Censuses agree Mabry C Oglesby was born in South Carolina. Mabry Chestley Oglesby was born January 14, 1870. Some Oglesbys are of mixed Scotch-Irish and Cherokee heritage and often called mulatto. The family were free persons of color. Mabry was not infrequently marked as mulatto on the US census.

At present the parents of Mabry Oglesby and their relation to the rest of the Oglesbys are unknown.

== Married ==
Mabry C Oglesby and Sadie E J Shankle were married in Washington, DC, Oct 17, 1901. He was aged 31 and she was 20. They had a child born in 1902. In November 1903 the Oglesbys acquired the home at 32 Seattle St in Boston probably based on the inheritance from Sadie's father who died in September - the house and land valued at $3300 then. That would be over $85,000 in 2018.

While Mabry began a life as a railroad Pullman Porter they also began a social life. They held receptions and toured sites upon the visit of Mabry's sister in 1907. In 1908 Sadie is reported head nurse at New York Nurses Training School and she also discussed a paper at the Thursday Evening Club. Sadie also gave a talk at St Mark's NY Literary on “Woman in Peace and War” on the crucial place of women in society.

The couple even went together to hear and discuss a paper presented by Archibald Grimké at the Thursday Evening Club in December 1908. In 1909 Sadie was on the St Mark's Musical and Literary Union executive committee.

The April 1910 Census finds Mabry C and Sadie E J Oglesby living on Seattle St. in Boston with a nephew and a lodger. It also says they were married about 8 yrs with one child born.

Sadie read a paper at Sunday School Exercises in July 1912, and is known to have given a talk at Buds of Promise in late 1913.

== Baháʼí Faith ==
The 1946 Baháʼí World biography of Mabry says the Oglebys encountered the religion in 1913, studied with Harlan and Grace Ober, and were convinced of it in 1917. The Oglesbys attended the 1920 Baháʼí national convention, and began holding meetings in Boston for the religion. Mabry spoke at the regular publicized Sunday afternoon Baháʼí meetings. The Oglesby family hosted Fazel Mazandarani, a Persian scholar of the religion sent by ʻAbdu'l-Bahá, then head of the religion. He gave a talk July 13 in their home during a tour of his in the US between dates held in town. Mabry was the speaker at Chauncy Hall, for Dec 12, 1920, on "The Bahai (sic) Revelation - the hope of Christianity”. Chauncy Hall was home to two suffrage organizations a decade earlier and the building still stands.

The 1920 Census finds Mabry C and Sadie E Olgesby, and daughter Bertha R, on Albion St. They were home owners. There is no mention of the 1902 child - either he/she had moved out by 18 yrs old, or had died in between. Their daughter Bertha was born in the District of Columbia and attended school and was 8 yrs old, born in 1912.

1921 opened on January 9 with Mabry giving a talk about the Baháʼí House of Worship (Wilmette, Illinois). Baháʼís noted at Chauncy Hall giving talks included Mabry in April. Mabry returned to give another talk a month later. In May Mabry reported on a translated cable sent to the national convention from ʻAbdu'l-Bahá.

Several meetings a week were being held in Boston in the spring of 1922, and there are reports in November of meetings, including at the Oglesby home on Tuesdays. Mabry was set to give a talk at Chauncy Hall on “The New Hope” February 4, 1923. During the 1923 national convention Mabry was on the committee for accreditation of the delegates.

While there is no mention yet found for 1924, January 1925 opens with Mabry being arrested for stealing liquor. He was found innocent and was represented in court by known Baháʼí Alfred E Lunt. In February Mabry was scheduled to talk on “The Servant of Humanity” at the Boston Baháʼí Center at one of the regular Sunday evening meetings. At the national convention Mabry contributed supporting comments about isolated Baháʼís broadening their circles of contact in the South. In June Mabry gave a talk at the Boston Bahaʼi Center entitled “Thy Kingdom Come". 1926 came with a talk by Mabry at the Bahaʼi Center “Service to man is service to God" in April, and “The need for universal understanding” in June.

=== Pilgrimage ===
Sadie wrote pilgrim notes of arriving for Baháʼí pilgrimage on March 11, 1927. There were 5 on that pilgrimage - the mother and daughter Oglesby, Edwina Powell, two others. Sadie was the third black pilgrim, first black woman, and the first black Baháʼí to be welcomed by Shoghi Effendi as head of the religion. The first was Robert Turner, second was Louis George Gregory. Sadie recorded comments about her pilgrimage. She recalled many observations Shoghi Effendi made about race issues in her notes:

- "Until the doors are opened and the colored people are attracted into the Cause the white people who are not believers will not have confidence in the sincerity of the friends and will not enter the Cause."
- "Racial unity and harmony, cooperation and freedom from racial prejudice is the first principle. If we will not keep the first principle, how can we hope to keep the following principles?"

She recalled commenting to Shoghi Effendi that she had been somewhat reticent to speak out on race matters and seeking interracial meetings and had tried to hold back her husband from doing so but Shoghi Effendi affirmed Mabry's approach and that Sadie should be insistent and urgent on the matter, had not done her duty and urged that integrated communities where "all differences are removed" was an important need of the community and its growth. In his discourses Sadie recalled others would interrupt seeking other priorities than race unity but Shoghi Effendi kept affirming race unity was a goal of the first order for America: "America's problem is the establishment of unity and harmony between the white and colored people." Another day a discussion was had about what was to be done if some elected institution lacked colored representation and he urged discussions of the needs of the Cause during meetings though not at the time of elections should be done. "At present, the colored are overwhelmed by the white." Shoghi Effendi urged Baháʼís to "look within themselves and find there the reason of so few colored people being in the Cause." However Sadie voiced the opinion that since it was the white that suffered to bring on the separation they needed to be the ones to right the matter and Shoghi Effendi was reported by her to have said "Yes, but we must help them." "Be eager, earnest and forceful in this matter."

In 1938 Shoghi Effendi would write directly himself upon such matters across several paragraphs in his text Advent of Divine Justice:

As to racial prejudice, the corrosion of which, for well-nigh a century, has bitten into the fiber, and attacked the whole social structure of American society, it should be regarded as constituting the most vital and challenging issue confronting the Baháʼí community at the present stage of its evolution. The ceaseless exertions which this issue of paramount importance calls for, the sacrifices it must impose, the care and vigilance it demands, the moral courage and fortitude it requires, the tact and sympathy it necessitates, invest this problem, which the American believers are still far from having satisfactorily resolved, with an urgency and importance that cannot be overestimated. … Let the white make a supreme effort in their resolve to contribute their share to the solution of this problem, to abandon once for all their usually inherent and at times subconscious sense of superiority, to correct their tendency towards revealing a patronizing attitude towards the members of the other race, to persuade them through their intimate, spontaneous and informal association with them of the genuineness of their friendship and the sincerity of their intentions, and to master their impatience of any lack of responsiveness on the part of a people who have received, for so long a period, such grievous and slow-healing wounds. Let the Negroes, through a corresponding effort on their part, show by every means in their power the warmth of their response, their readiness to forget the past, and their ability to wipe out every trace of suspicion that may still linger in their hearts and minds. Let neither think that the solution of so vast a problem is a matter that exclusively concerns the other. Let neither think that such a problem can either easily or immediately be resolved. Let neither think that they can wait confidently for the solution of this problem until the initiative has been taken, and the favorable circumstances created, by agencies that stand outside the orbit of their Faith. Let neither think that anything short of genuine love, extreme patience, true humility, consummate tact, sound initiative, mature wisdom, and deliberate, persistent, and prayerful effort, can succeed in blotting out the stain which this patent evil has left on the fair name of their common country.

Sadie says they were there 20 days. During this period, Mabry gave a talk at Chauncy Hall on “Independent investigation of truth”.

After returning, Sadie sent a message to the national convention read by Mrs Ober on a plea for unity crossing racial and ethnic lines. Fellow pilgrim Edwina Powell was there and echoed Sadie's pilgrimage experience with Shoghi Effendi's tone on the issue of unity.

=== Action ===
==== 1927 Race Amity Convention ====
The Olgesbys are not recorded attending the early Baháʼí efforts on public engagement on race unity - the so called Race Amity Conventions - which began in earnest in 1921. However, at a 1927 Race Amity meeting in Green Acre Baháʼí School, a major institution of the religion, Sadie was noted recently returned from pilgrimage with Edwina Powell and together they shared their shared pleas for race unity. Coverage of this also appeared in the Chicago Defender.

==== 1928 meetings ====
Sadie chaired the fourth Baháʼí sponsored public conference for "Inter-Racial Harmony and Peace" at Chaucey Hall in Boston March 18. Margaret Slattery spoke. Slattery was a then well known writer/speaker with interests in religion and women. Sadie visited the Chicago Defender offices during the national convention in Chicago, and was given a reception after. Sadie also visited Milwaukee in 1928.

Sadie was with Philip Marangella and William Randall, (a black woman on stage with two white men,) at Green Acre in August speaking of the teachings of the religion and “what it meant to those who gave themselves sincerely to it." In November Mabry appeared as one of the four panelists speaking at the second session of the Race Amity Convention at Green Acre along with Keith Ransom-Kehler, Agnes Parsons, and Mary Maxwell, (later known as Rúhíyyih Khánum,) as a black man along with three white women.

==== 1929 meetings ====
The Oglesbys went to the national convention and Mabry closed a national post-convention conference on promoting the religion in Boston. Mabry passed on a comment Sadie attributed to Shoghi Effendi had spoken to the effect that both races would have to make concessions to build unity on the race problem.

=== Boston Assembly ===
The Boston Assembly held two meetings on Race Amity in 1930 - Sadie spoke at the first and Mrs Walter Coristine at the second.

The 1930 Census says almost all the Oglesby's neighbors were Polish or Russian emigrants living at 40 Walnut Park.

In 1933-4 Sadie was treasurer of the Boston Spiritual Assembly as the Great Depression in the United States rolled on.

At the July 1933 Race Amity Convention at Green Acre, Sadie was among those who spoke at the second session sharing instructions Shoghi Effendi had given her about race relations. At the 1934 national convention Sadie was one of the delegates from Boston.

Information becomes progressively scarcer as the 1930s rolled on. Mabry continued work as a Pullman In 1935 Louise G Gregory that the Boston Baháʼí community was integrated with a large proportion being colored and largely through the work of Sadie. Sadie's home was among those that hosted some of the weekly study classes held in Boston.

Sadie was one of the delegates for the 1936 national convention from Boston, and Mabry was elected president of the Boston local chapter of the Brotherhood of Sleeping Car Porters in 1936.

Sadie was the secretary of the Boston Spiritual Assembly located for 1937. and again in 1940 mid-way in the year.

The 1940 Census found the Oglesbys on West Springfield St. At the 1941 Race Unity meeting at Green Acre Sadie read prayers and quotes at the Sunday morning session on August 10.

It is not clear when, but in 1946 Gregory and Ober said Mabry was also a member of the Boston Assembly for 14 years.

=== Ammet'u'lláh Sadie Oglesby ===
From 1943 Sadie began a series of talks and took the name Ammet'u'lláh, Arabic for "Handmaiden of God" which she used in the newspaper advertisements of her talks as well as inside the Boston community. In November her talk was "Man's birthright". In March 1944 she gave the talk “Step by step with the prophets”. In July she offered “Independent investigation of truth”, and “Divine love” Sunday evening in August. In March 1945 her talk was “The days of days”.

Mabry died May 19, 1945.

Sadie returned in her talk “The fulfillment” in June. In August her talk was “The Covenant of God”. In December her talk was “The second coming of Christ”, and her last known talk, “The call to reality”, came in March 1946.

Ammet'u'lláh Sadie Oglesby died in Feb 1956.

== See also ==
- Baháʼí Faith in Greater Boston
- Baháʼí Faith and the unity of humanity
