= James Thompson Bixby =

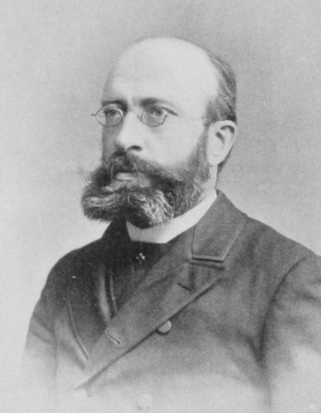
- Born: July 30, 1843; Barre, Massachusetts, US
- Died: December 26, 1921 (aged 78); Yonkers, New York, US
- Education: Harvard College; Harvard Divinity School; University of Leipzig

James Thompson Bixby (July 30, 1843 – December 26, 1921) was a United States Unitarian minister and writer.

== Biography ==
He was born at Barre, Massachusetts, and graduated from Harvard College (1864) and Harvard Divinity School (B.D., 1870). He entered the ministry, and served as a minister for Unitarian churches in Watertown, Massachusetts (1870–74), Belfast, Maine (1875-79), and Meadville, Pennsylvania (1879–83). In Meadville, he was also professor of the philosophy of religion in the Meadville Theological School from 1879 to 1883.

In 1883, he went abroad for study and travel, receiving the degree of Ph.D. at the University of Leipzig in 1885, having also attended the universities at Jena and Heidelberg. He served as a minister in Yonkers, New York (1887-1903). He retired in 1903, and spent his last years in Yonkers. He died at his home there on December 26, 1921.

He lectured on the philosophy of religious at the Lowell Institute, Boston, in 1876 and 1883. He was a member of the Authors' Club and Authors' League of America. He was interested in founding theology on a scientific basis, and his studies of comparative religion also found expression in his writings. In his later life, he wrote on immortality for Bibliotheca Sacra and Biblical World.

Bixby criticized the arguments of Felix Leopold Oswald, that Christianity was of Buddhist origin.

== Works ==
- Similarities of Physical and Religious Knowledge (1876; 2nd ed. under the title Religion and Science as Allies, 1889)
- Evolution and Christianity (1891)
- James T. Bixby (December 1897). "Babism and the Bab". The New World; A Quarterly Review of Religion, Ethics, and Theology. 6 (24): 722–750.
- The Crisis in Morals; Examination of Rational Ethics in the Light of Modern Science (1891; 2nd ed. under the title, The Ethics of Evolution, 1900)
- The New World and the New Thought (1902)
- The Open Secret (1912)
- What is Bahaism? (1912)
