= Urbain Ledoux =

American diplomat and activist

Urbain J. Ledoux
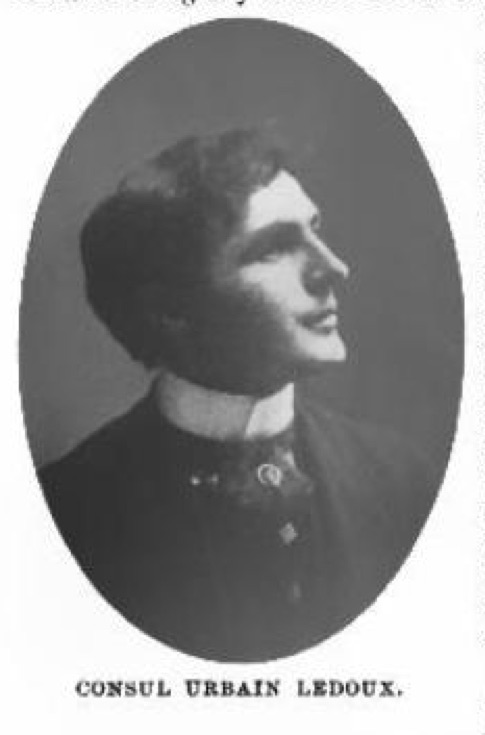
- Urbain Ledoux circa 1906
- Born: 1874-08-13; Sainte-Hélène-de-Bagot, Quebec, Canada
- Died: April 8, 1941 (aged 66); New York City, New York, United States
- Other names: Mr. Zero
- Occupations: Diplomat, activist
- Known for: breadlines for unemployed

Urbain J. Ledoux (August 13, 1874 – April 8, 1941), later known as "Mr. Zero", preferring his own name not to be prominent, was an American diplomat and activist with a declared interest in the Baháʼí Faith.

His quest to serve humanity began early in life. He sought to become a Catholic priest at 15, but witnessed a case of priest abuse and quit the seminary about the age of 17. He began to work for law and business interests, hoping to use these as a means of progress for humanity. He then sought to serve in diplomatic service for the United States with this approach and earned a few promotions. He advocated that commercial development could be a means to further the interests of humanity, but came to believe that personal transformation was more important.

He quit the diplomatic service and sought to work with non-governmental organizations for both business and peace interests. Soon he was working with the Baháʼís and was present during the conflict over the status of Sarah Farmer, when she was involuntarily committed to a mental institution in 1910. He led the efforts to free her from involuntary confinement in an insane asylum, ultimately gathering a chief of police and a judge to accompany a court order to effect her freedom.

He then began to found humanitarian organisations. He first made news seeking to help with unemployment after the First World War among workers and veterans on the breadline. He advocated for the Baháʼí Faith, albeit with a limited understanding of the principles of the religion. Ledoux set up events aimed at raising awareness of the suffering of the unemployed in New York and Boston.

His efforts were seen as too confrontational. His events were repeatedly shut down, even when he sought to be less confrontational and have discussions with leaders. The work was renewed with greater intensity during the Great Depression but he was in his 60s already and died soon after. Some of his work and antics were recorded in pictures and newsreels.

== Biography ==
Born August 13, 1874 in Sainte-Hélène-de-Bagot, Quebec, his family soon moved to Biddeford, Maine. He had limited schooling and began to work to support the family at age nine. He was an altar boy and read French religious books. At 15 he sought to enter the Catholic priesthood at a seminary in Marieville, Quebec. Two years later he witnessed a case of priest abuse of an altar boy, quit the priesthood and soon began work at a law firm back in Maine. He also began to organize political clubs, became Republican ward leader, and launched the first French language publications and newspaper stories in Maine.

In 1895, Ledoux sought an open consulate position with the US Government at the age of 21 and was assigned to Trois-Rivières where he engaged in promoting business interests, French language and culture in an anglophone environment as well as seeking balance in that advocacy. He was promoted in 1903, and sent as consul to Prague where he represented business interests. In 1907 he was promoted again, but chose not to accept appointment to Brazil.

He had been challenged that his goals required a means to transform human nature. He returned to the States in 1910 and was involved in Boston area peace initiatives the same year. In 1912 he was working with peace activist Paul Otlet.

In 1915, Ledoux was working with Baháʼís, especially at Green Acre Baháʼí School, and would later credit many of his actions to the tenets of the Baháʼí Faith. He was perhaps the third francophone Baháʼí born out of Canada. At the time Sarah Farmer, founder of Green Acre, was ill and had been involuntarily committed to an insane asylum. Ledoux led the effort to free her which, though it was confrontational, included the local chief of police and judge in the attempt with a court order. ʻAbdu'l-Bahá, then head of the religion, praised Ledoux for his work in freeing Farmer.

That year, Henry Ford financed the Peace Ship mission to attempt to end World War I, setting sail in December 1915. Ledoux attempted to join the expedition, but wasn't accepted. Instead, he jumped off the pier and made a spectacle swimming after the ship – an act that got notice in the newspapers and entered him into public awareness.

As his actions became more pronounced, he protested that his aims were apolitical - that he was neither an agitator nor a Bolshevist – and that his aims were religiously based. He claimed he was trying "to awaken the slumbering conscience of the people."

== His institutions ==
In the vicinity of Greenacre Ledoux opened a "Unity Hotel" in 1917.

During the war he began to assist in the relief of soldiers' families. After the Armistice he began to assist jobless veterans.

=== The Stepping Stone ===
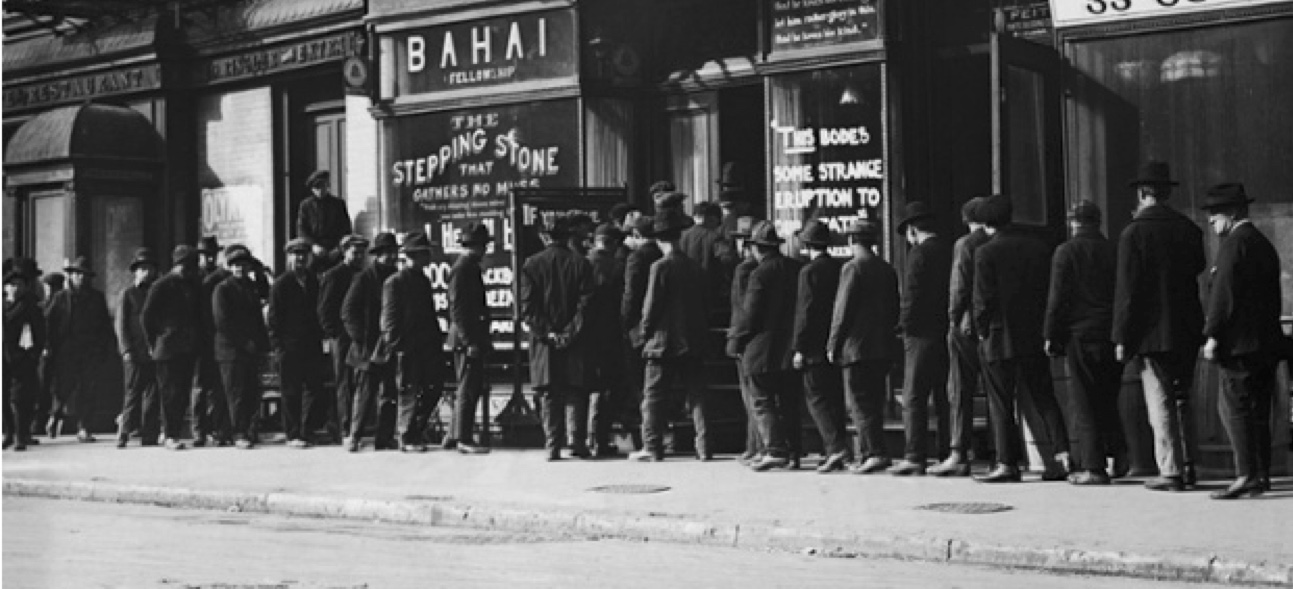
"Stepping Stone" breadline managed by Urbain Ledoux, New York, NY, 1919.

In April 1919 Ledoux opened a breadline named "The Stepping Stone" near Bowery and 9th Street in NY. He did this with the assistance of some Baháʼís as well as some financial support. Mason Remey went down one time to see what it was like and was taken up in the enthusiasm both of the work and the chance to talk.

A picture was taken of "The Stepping Stone" and several newspapers covered its establishment. Also in April 1919 Ledoux had an article published in Star of the West called "The Oneness of the World of Humanity". In June ʻAbdu'l-Bahá sent a message hoping he would promulgate the Baháʼí religion, human unity, universal peace, and overcome prejudices dividing the world. In August he was one of the signatories of a letter to ʻAbdu'l-Baha hoping for a return trip to the United States. He met Dane Rudhyar who inquired about the religion but did not join. In April 1920 he was a delegate to the national convention of the Baháʼís. In January 1921 he helped to run a Baháʼí meeting in New York. At the same time he appeared in national media like The Nation. A biographical sketch of him appeared in The Survey, a charity journal under Paul Underwood Kellogg, and The New Republic, in October and The Independent in November. Each painted him in different ways. Some of the coverage referenced his advocacy of the Baháʼí Faith, and was sometimes confused with Buddhism, - a confusion that echoes more recently.

The 'Stepping Stone' picture was eventually acquired by Getty Images, has been used some 90 years later and has been noticed by Baháʼís and others.

=== Further endeavors ===
Ledoux escalated his efforts and organized the unemployed and former soldiers. He set up hotels for them to stay in, tried to get them invited to President Harding's inaugural ball, and eventually ran foul of the law while presenting their case (and them) to the socialites of New York. He escalated his efforts with a public "slave auction" of jobless war veterans on the steps of the New York Public Library. The authorities began to systematically reject his applications for events. In 1921, he repeated the action in Boston and had some success, including getting 150 people jobs, but after a major row he became less confrontational, instead relying on churches for contributions for relief to the poor. He gained an audience with President Harding but it did not lead to a change. While in Washington, he gave several talks at the Baháʼí Center though in his enthusiasm some of his points were clearly off base compared to those of the faith. Refusing to learn the formal teachings of the religion, the remainder of his talks were canceled. Meanwhile, he was praised as a mystic. While away from Boston, much of what he had set up had been dismantled. He tried to move the starving to another hotel. In a confrontation with the desk clerk, he quoted passages from the Gospel of Matthew but the clerk was not moved enough to allow them to stay.

Ledoux broadened his advocacy for all the unemployed and labored further for years before and during the Great Depression. In one stunt he would hold a lantern "looking for an honest man" or "a Christian delegate" who would address the wrongs in society; eventually he drew attention to Eugene V. Debs. He downplayed the inspiration of the Baháʼí Faith because of xenophobic fears among the public. Films were taken of him trying to promote the work. Pictures were taken too.

He died in April 1941, with his daughter Yvette having moved there to help him. Obituaries were published by Associated Press and United Press International as well as independently. In 1973 an Ed.D thesis was done on Ledoux.

== See also ==
- List of peace activists
