= Iranian Americans =

Ethnic group in the United States

Iranian Americans ایرانیانِ آمریکا
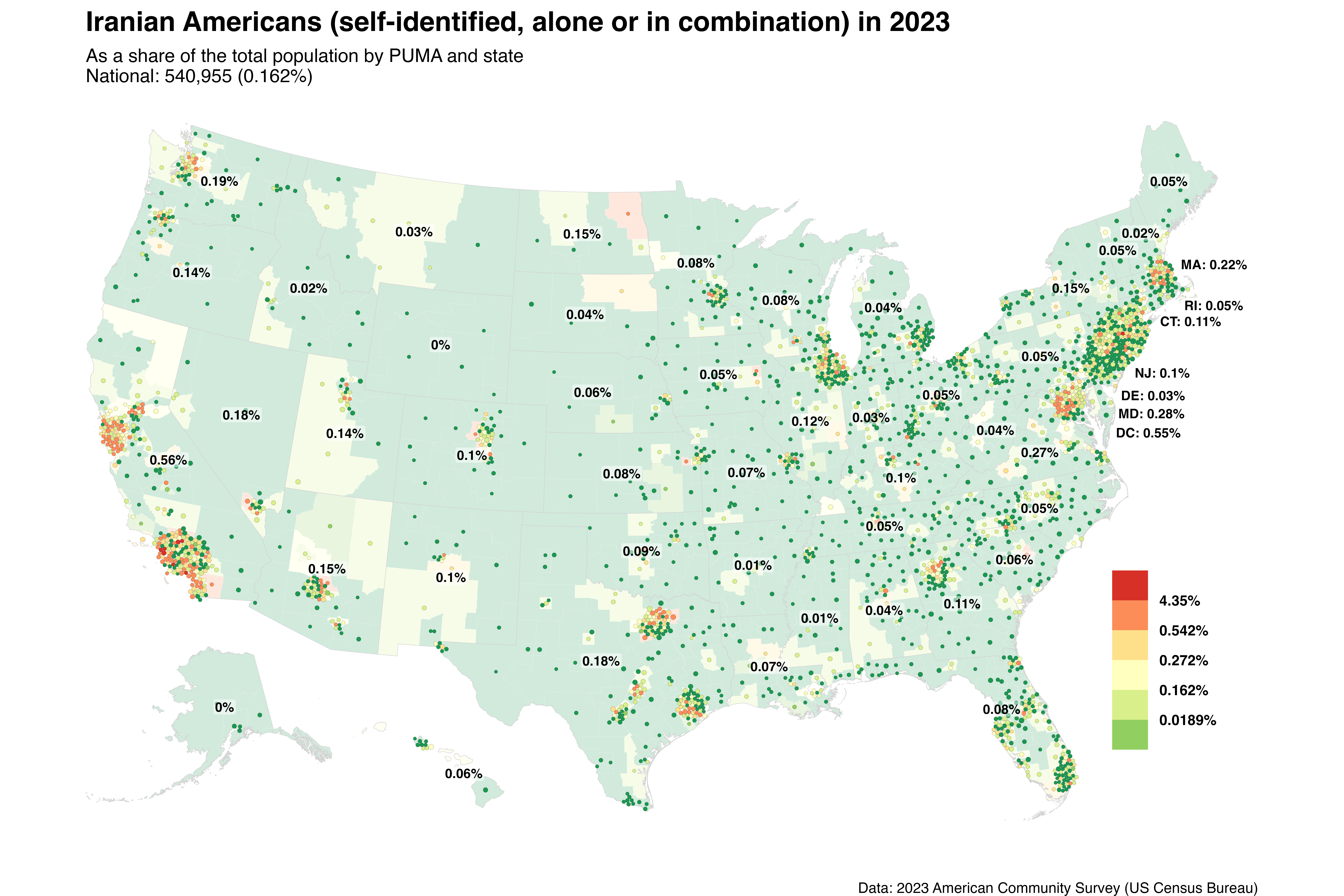
- Iranian American population by PUMA and state

Total population
- 568,564 (2020 census); 470,341 (ACS, 2011); 1,500,000 (other estimates); 0.45% of the American population

Regions with significant populations
- California (largest populations in Los Angeles, Orange and San Diego counties), Texas (especially Houston and Dallas-Fort Worth), D.C. metro area (District of Columbia, Maryland, Virginia), New York metro area, Georgia

Languages
- American English, As well native (Persian, Azerbaijani, Armenian, Kurdish, and other languages of Iran).

Religion
- Islam 31%, Atheism/Realism/Humanism 11%, Agnosticism 8%, Baháʼí 7%, Judaism 5%, Protestantism 5%, Roman Catholicism 2%, Zoroastrianism 2%, Other 15% including Mandaeanism, and No Response 15%.^{[a]}

Related ethnic groups
- Other Iranian diaspora, particularly in Western countries (Iranian Canadians • Iranians in the United Kingdom • Iranians in Germany • Iranians in France • Iranians in Sweden • Iranians of Israel etc.) Persians • Iranian Azerbaijanis • Iranian Armenians • Persian Jews • Iranian Kurds etc.
- ^aA 2012 national telephone survey of a sample of 400 Iranian-Americans in the Los Angeles area, commissioned by the Public Affairs Alliance of Iranian Americans and conducted by Zogby Research Services, asked the respondents what their religions were. The survey had a cooperation rate of 31.2%.

Iranian-Americans, also known as Persian Americans, are United States citizens or inhabitants who have Iranian ancestry or citizenship. According to Iran's National Organization for Civil Registration, the United States has the largest Iranian diaspora population in the world. A 2004 study conducted by the Massachusetts Institute of Technology estimated the number of Iranian-Americans at approximately 691,000.

Beginning in the 1950s, the Imperial State of Iran sponsored thousands of Iranian students to study in the United States through government scholarship programs, contributing to the growth of early Iranian communities centered around American universities. However, following the Iranian Revolution in 1979, a much larger wave of Iranians immigrated to the United States, many fleeing repression or pursuing greater economic opportunities. More than 40% settled in Southern California, particularly in Greater Los Angeles, where they formed distinct ethnic enclaves such as the community of "Tehrangeles" in Westwood.

== Terminology ==
"Iranian-American" is sometimes used interchangeably with "Persian-American", partly due to the fact that, in the Western world, Iran was known as "Persia". On the Nowruz of 1935, Reza Shah Pahlavi asked foreign delegates to use the term Iran, the endonym of the country used since the Sasanian Empire, in formal correspondence. Since then the use of "Iran" has become more common in Western countries. This also changed the usage of the terms for Iranian nationality, and the common adjective for citizens of Iran changed from "Persian" to "Iranian." In 1959, the government of Mohammad Reza Pahlavi, Reza Shah Pahlavi's son, announced that both "Persia" and "Iran" could officially be used interchangeably. The issue is still debated today.

Some wish to disassociate themselves from the Islamic Republic of Iran, yet this rationale has been criticized as the term "Iran" was widely used before 1979 as well. The term "Iranian" is regarded as more inclusive than "Persian", as the term "Persian" excludes non-Persian ethnic minorities of Iran. While the majority of Iranian-Americans come from Persian backgrounds, there is a significant number of non-Persian Iranians such as Azeris, Assyrians, Armenians, Arabs and Kurds within the Iranian-American community, leading some scholars to believe that the label "Iranian" is more inclusive, since the label "Persian" excludes non-Persian minorities.

== History ==
=== Early history ===
One of the first recorded Iranians to visit North America was Martin the Armenian, an Iranian-Armenian tobacco grower who settled in Jamestown, Virginia in 1618.

Mirza Mohammad Ali, also known as Hajj Sayyah, was an Iranian who came to North America in the 1800s. He was inspired to travel around the world due to the contradiction between the democratic ideals he read about and how his fellow Iranians were treated by their leaders. He began his travels as a 23-year-old looking for knowledge, to experience the lives of others, and to use that knowledge to help with Iran's progress. His stay in the United States lasted 10 years, and he traveled across the country from New York to San Francisco. He met a variety of influential American figures including President Ulysses S. Grant, who met with him on several occasions.

On 26 May 1875, Hajj Sayyah became the first Iranian to become an American citizen. He was imprisoned upon his return to Iran for taking a stand against living conditions there. He looked to the United States to protect him but to no avail. During the peak period of worldwide emigration to the United States (1842–1903), only 130 Iranian nationals were known to have immigrated.

In 1904, Mirza Ali Kuli Khan Zarabi (Nabil-Al-Dawla), an Iranian diplomat married Florence Breed Khan, an American Bahá'í convert. Together they had three children, including a daughter born in 1908 named Marzieh Nabil Khan (later known as Marzieh Gail). Marzieh Gail was educated in the United States and became a noted Bahaʾi author, essayist, and translator; and she was one of the earliest children born from a mixed Persian and American marriage.

=== First phase of emigration ===
The first wave of Iranian migration to the United States occurred from the late 1940s to 1977, or 1979. The United States was an attractive destination for students, as American universities offered some of the best programs in engineering and other fields, and were eager to attract students from foreign countries. Iranian students, most of whom had learned English as a second language in Iran, were highly desirable as new students at colleges and universities in the United States. By the mid-1970s, nearly half of all Iranian students who studied abroad did so in the United States. By 1975, the Institute of International Education's annual foreign student census figures listed Iranian students as the largest group of foreign students in the United States, amounting to a total of 9% of all foreign students in the country. As the Iranian economy continued to rise steadily in the 70s, it enabled many more Iranians to travel abroad freely. Consequently, the number of Iranian visitors to the United States also increased considerably, from 35,088, in 1975, to 98,018, in 1977. During the 1977–78 academic year, of about 100,000 Iranian students abroad, 36,220 were enrolled in American institutions of higher learning. During the 1978–79 academic year, on the eve of the revolution, the number of Iranian students enrolled in American institutions rose to 45,340, and in 1979–80, that number reached a peak of 51,310. At that time, according to the Institute of International Education, more students from Iran were enrolled in American universities than from any other foreign country. The pattern of Iranian migration during this phase usually only involved individuals, not whole families. Due to Iran's increasing demand for educated workers in the years before the revolution, the majority of the Iranian students in America intended to return home after graduation to work, especially those who had received financial aid from the Iranian government or from industry on condition of returning to take jobs upon graduation. Due to the drastic events of the 1979 Revolution, the students ended up staying in the United States as refugees. These several thousand visitors and students unintentionally became the basis of the cultural, economic, and social networks that would enable large-scale immigration in the years that followed.

=== Second phase ===
The second phase of Iranian migration began immediately before and after the Iranian Revolution of 1979 and the overthrow of the Shah Mohammad Reza Pahlavi, and became significant in the early 1980s. As Ronald H. Bayor writes, "The 1979 Revolution and the 1980–88 war with Iraq transformed Iran's class structure, politically, socially, and economically." The revolution drastically changed the pattern and nature of Iranian emigration to the United States, while the Iran-Iraq War that ensued afterwards was also another factor that forced many of the best-educated and most wealthy families into exile in the United States and other countries. Once basically an issue of brain drain during the Pahlavi period, it was now predominantly an involuntary emigration of a relatively large number of middle- and upper-class families, including the movement of a considerable amount of wealth. During and after the revolution, most students did not return to Iran, and those who did were gradually purged from the newly established Islamic Republic. Many students who graduated abroad after the revolution also did not return, due to the ruling clergy's repression. As a result, the educated elite who left Iran after the revolution, and the new graduates in the United States who chose not to return home, created a large pool of highly educated and skilled Iranian professionals in the United States. By 2002, an estimated 1.5 to 2.5 million Iranians lived abroad, mainly in North America and Europe, due to the Islamic government's authoritarian practices.

A further notable aspect of the migration in this phase is that members of religious and ethnic minorities were starting to become disproportionally represented among the Iranian American community, most notably Baháʼís, Zoroastrians, Jews, Armenians, Assyrians and Arabs According to the 1980 US census, there were 123,000 Americans of Iranian ancestry at that time. Between 1980 and 1990, the number of foreign-born people from Iran in the United States increased by 74 percent.

The revolution caused a drastic change in the Iranian culture. Iran was no longer a thriving country. This is part of the reason so many Iranians began to flee to America.

=== Contemporary period ===
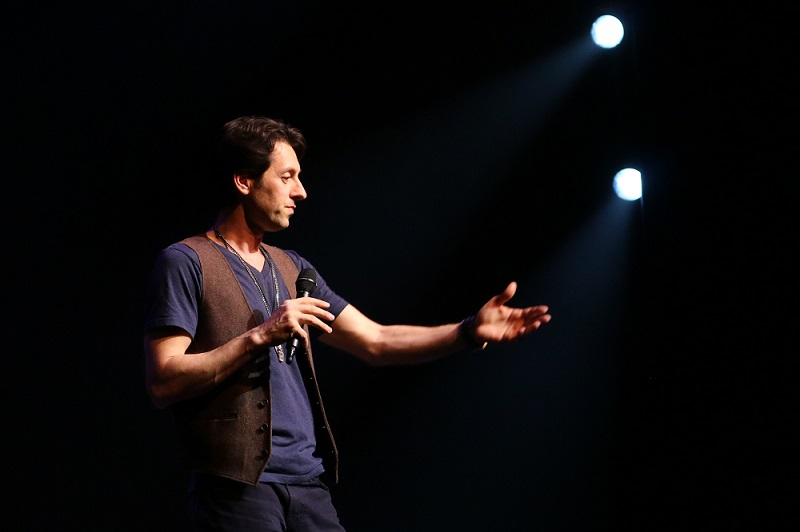
Max Amini, Iranian American stand-up comedian.

The third phase of Iranian immigration started in 1995 and continues to the present. According to the 2000 US census, there were 283,225 Iranian-born people in the US. According to the same 2000 US census, there were 385,488 Americans of Iranian ancestry at that time. The 2011 American Community Survey (ACS) estimate found 470,341 Americans with full or partial Iranian ancestry. However, most experts believe that this is a problem of underrepresenting due to the fact that "many community members have been reluctant in identifying themselves as such because of the problems between Iran and the United States in the past two decades." and also because many were ethnic minorities (Jewish, Armenian, and Assyrian Iranians) who instead identify as the ethnic group they are part of rather than as Iranians. Estimates of over 1,000,000 are cited by a range of sources, including scholars, media, and community organizations. Kenneth Katzman, specialist in Middle Eastern affairs and part of the Congressional Research Service, in December 2015 estimated the number at over 1,000,000. Paul Harvey and Edward Blum of the University of Colorado and the University of San Diego in 2012 estimated their number at 1,000,000, as well as Al-Jazeera. According to the PAAIA (Public Affairs Alliance of Iranian Americans), estimates range from 500,000 to 1,000,000, numbers backed up by Ronald H. Bayor of the Georgia Institute of Technology as well. The Atlantic stated that there were an estimated 1,500,000 Iranians in the United States in 2012. The Iranian interest section in Washington, D.C., in 2003 claimed to hold passport information for approximately 900,000 Iranians in the US.

Today, the United States contains the highest number of Iranians outside of Iran. The Iranian-American community has produced individuals notable in many fields, including medicine, engineering, and business.

== Demographics ==
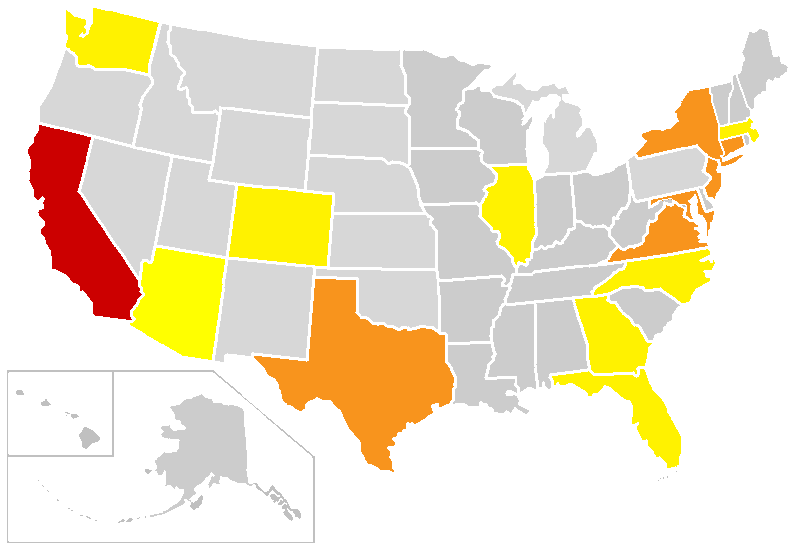
Relative population distribution estimate of 1st and 2nd generation Iranian Americans living in the United States by percentage of total population. > 49% of all Iranians 6–9% of all Iranians 2–5% of all Iranians < 1% but may still be a notable population

Although Iranians have lived in the United States in relatively small numbers since the 1930s, a large number of Iranian-Americans immigrated to the United States after the Iranian Revolution of 1979. Data on this group is well documented by the United States Citizenship and Immigration Services (USCIS). According to the 2000 US census, there were 385,488 Americans of Iranian ancestry at that time. In the 2011 ACS, the number of Americans of full or partial Iranian ancestry amounted c. 470,341.

=== Population ===
Federal data on Iranian Americans in the 2010 United States census was not according to race, but rather ancestry, which is collected by the annual American Community Survey (ACS). Data on Iranian ancestry from the annual ACS is available on the Census Bureau's American Factfinder website. Racially, on the census, Iranian Americans have been classified as a white American group.

Most experts believe that the underrepresented number of Iranian-Americans in the ACS is a problem due to the fact that "many community members have been reluctant in identifying themselves as such because of the problems between Iran and the United States in the past two decades." Estimations of 1,000,000 and above are given by many Iranian and non-Iranian organizations, media, and scholars. Kenneth Katzman, specialist in Middle Eastern affairs and part of the Congressional Research Service, estimated their number at over 1,000,000 in published December 2015. Historians Paul Harvey and Edward Blum estimate their number at 1,000,000 in 2012, as well as Al-Jazeera. According to the PAAIA (Public Affairs Alliance of Iranian-Americans), estimates range from 500,000 to 1,000,000, numbers backed by Ronald H. Bayor of the Georgia Institute of Technology. The Atlantic, in 2012, stated that there are an estimated 1,500,000 Iranians in the United States. The Iranian interest section in Washington D.C., in 2003, claimed to hold passport information for approximately 900,000 Iranians in the US.

According to research done by the Iranian Studies Group, an independent academic organization at the Massachusetts Institute of Technology (MIT), Iranian Americans are most likely far more numerous in the United States than census data indicate. The group estimates that the number of Iranian-Americans may have topped 691,000 in 2004—more than twice the figure of 338,000 cited in the 2000 US census.

Sources from the Ministry of Foreign Affairs of Iran have stated the United States has the highest number of Iranians outside the country, stating 1,500,000 Iranians who were born in Iran are living in the U.S. However this number only represents Iranian born population who moved to the U.S. at some point and does not include the number of U.S.-born Iranian-Americans and other groups with Iranian ancestors.

Roughly half of the nation's Iranians reside in the state of California alone. Other large communities include New York/New Jersey, which have 9.1% of the U.S.'s Iranian population, followed by Washington, D.C./Maryland/Virginia (8.3%) and Texas (6.7%).

Approximately 6,000–10,000 Iranian Americans reside in the city of Chicago, while up to 30,000 reside in the Chicago metropolitan area. Some of this population is Iranian Assyrian.

Kings Point, New York, a village in Great Neck, New York, is said to have the largest concentration of Iranians in the United States (nearly 30%). However, unlike the population in Los Angeles, the Great Neck population is almost exclusively Jewish.

Nashville, Tennessee has the largest Kurdish population in the United States, many of whom emigrated from Iran.

==== Significant Iranian population centers ====
===== California =====
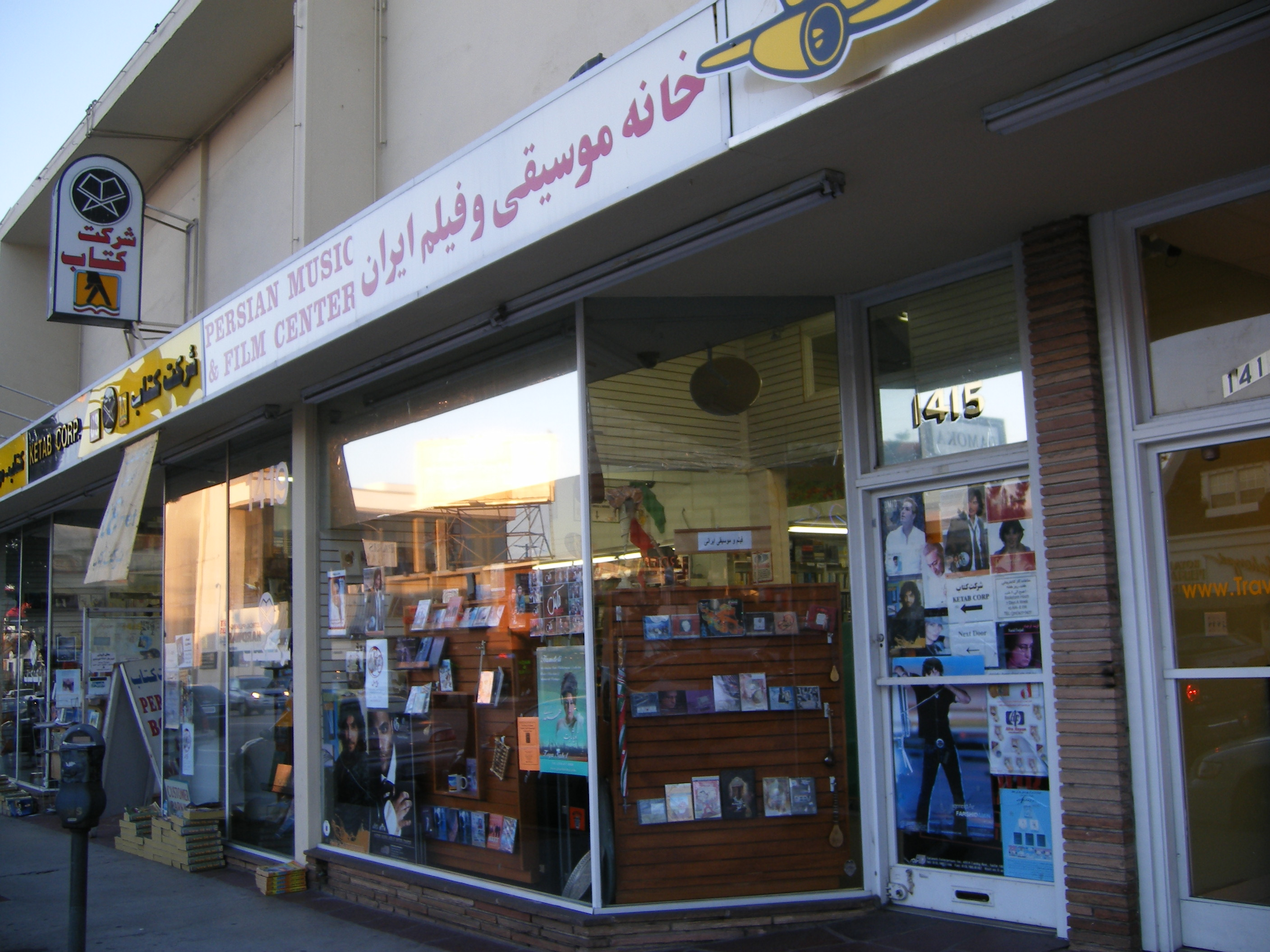
The Los Angeles metropolitan area has the largest concentration of Iranian-Americans. An area along Westwood Boulevard in Los Angeles has been officially designated Persian Square by the city.

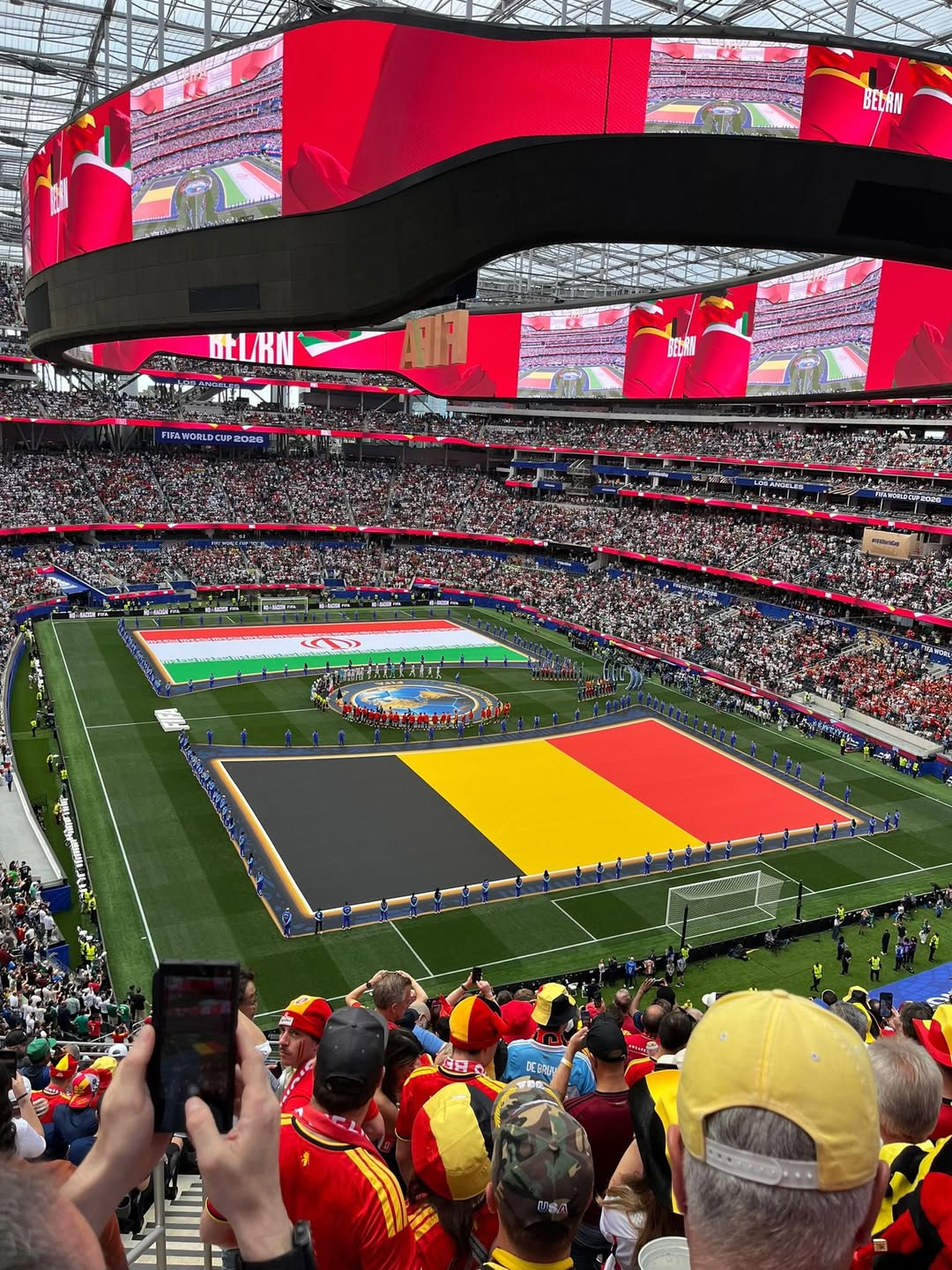
During the 2026 FIFA World Cup, Iran played two matches at SoFi Stadium in the Greater Los Angeles area, which is home to the largest Iranian diaspora population in the US.

It is widely believed that most Iranian-Americans in the United States are clustered in the large cities of California, namely Greater Los Angeles, the San Francisco Bay Area, San Diego, Sacramento, and Fresno. According to extrapolated U.S. census data and other independent surveys done by Iranian-Americans themselves in 2009, there were an estimated one million Iranian-Americans living in the U.S., with the largest concentration—about 300,000 people—living in the greater Los Angeles area. For this reason, the Westwood, L.A. area, with its Iranian American residents, is sometimes colloquially referred to as "Tehrangeles", "Irangeles", or "Little Persia" among Iranian-Americans.

In 1985, the Los Angeles Times estimated 200,000 Iranian-Americans were living in California; and by 1991 the estimate jumped to 800,000, however the accuracy of these numbers could be debated due to a lack of data. In 1990, Los Angeles had a larger population of religious minorities than Muslims, who were the religious majority in Iran.

Regarding Iranian-Americans of Armenian origin, the 1980 US census put the number of Armenians living in Los Angeles at 52,400, of whom 71.9% were foreign born: 14.7% in Iran, 14.3% in the USSR, 11.5% in Lebanon, 9.7% in Turkey, 11.7% in other Middle Eastern countries (Egypt, Iraq, Israel, etc.), and the rest in other parts of the world. Beverly Hills, Irvine, and Glendale all have large communities of Iranian-Americans (much of the Iranian population in Glendale being of Armenian descent); 26% of the total population of Beverly Hills is Iranian Jewish, making it the city's largest religious community.

Iranian-Americans have formed ethnic enclaves in many affluent neighborhoods mostly in the Los Angeles metropolitan area. In Los Angeles, Iranians were concentrated in Tarzana, West Hills, Hidden Hills, Woodland Hills, Beverly Hills, Calabasas, Brentwood, and Rancho Palos Verdes. Tarzana has the highest concentration of Iranians in Los Angeles County, according to the US census in 2000.

Second-generation Iranian Americans living outside major population centers showed high rates of intermarriage and lower Persian literacy.

Areas in Los Angeles with the highest concentrations of Iranians (2015)
Rank	Cities	Percentage of population of Iranian descent
1	Beverly Hills	20.8%
2	West Los Angeles	12.2%
3	Westwood	10.3%
4	Tarzana, Los Angeles	10.3%
5	Woodland Hills, Los Angeles	8.8%
6	Bel Air, Los Angeles	8.8%
7	Century City	8.1%
8	Rancho Palos Verdes	3.7%

In San Diego County, the communities of La Jolla and Westlake village also held a large Iranian population. La Jolla was the first American city to have an Iranian American mayor Iraj Broomand.

===== Texas =====
Texas also has a large population of Iranian descent. And like California, Iranians in Texas are concentrated in the larger major cities of the state. Houston has the largest population of Iranians and Iranian expats, with an estimated 70,000 residents (50,000 in 1994), mainly due to the Texas Medical Center and the presence of large energy companies. Houston contains an Iranian business district including shops and restaurants that has been dubbed "Little Persia" by the Houston Press. There are many Iranian Zoroastrians and Baháʼís living there.

Some of the more well known residents of the Houston area in the past or present are Jasmin Moghbeli, Susan Roshan, Shawn Daivari, Farinaz Koushanfar, Hayedeh, Mahasti and Kavon Hakimzadeh (captain of the US09S Harry Truman Naval aircraft carrier). Ibrahim Yazdi was a graduate of Baylor College of Medicine and Kamal Kharazi also is an alumnus of University of Houston. Hushang Ansary, an active philanthropist, has been a "founding benefactor" of the Houston Museum of Fine Arts. The George Bush Presidential Library has a gallery named after him. Iranians in Houston particularly came under the spotlight when Iranian student and activist Gelareh Bagherzadeh was murdered in Houston in 2012. The perpetrator, Ali Irsan, was later convicted and sentenced to death for the crime, an honor killing in retaliation against Bagherzadeh's encouragement of Irsan's daughter to leave Islam and marry a Christian man. The other notable Iranian in Texas that gained national attention in recent years was UT Austin's Omid Kokabee who was imprisoned in Iran for political reasons.

The Dallas-Fort Worth metropolitan area is estimated to have over 30,000 Iranian-Americans. Iran's first astronaut Anousheh Ansari for many years was a resident of Plano, Texas, a suburb of Dallas-Fort Worth. Dallas' Iranian community was large and influential enough to host US Secretary of State Mike Pompeo for a private visit in April 2019. And San Antonio and Austin each are said to have 3000–5000 Iranian American residents each, who are mostly attracted to large academic centers of excellence such as South Texas Medical Center and UT Austin or the climate of the Texas Hill Country area that is not un-similar to the southern Iran Zagros Mountains region. The largest concentration of Mandaeans from Khuzestan outside the middle east are settled in the San Antonio area. The Shah of Iran was also last hospitalized at San Antonio's Wilford Hall Ambulatory Surgical Center in Lackland Air Force Base during his last days. This is the same base that trained many pilots of Iran's Royal Air Force before the 1979 revolution.

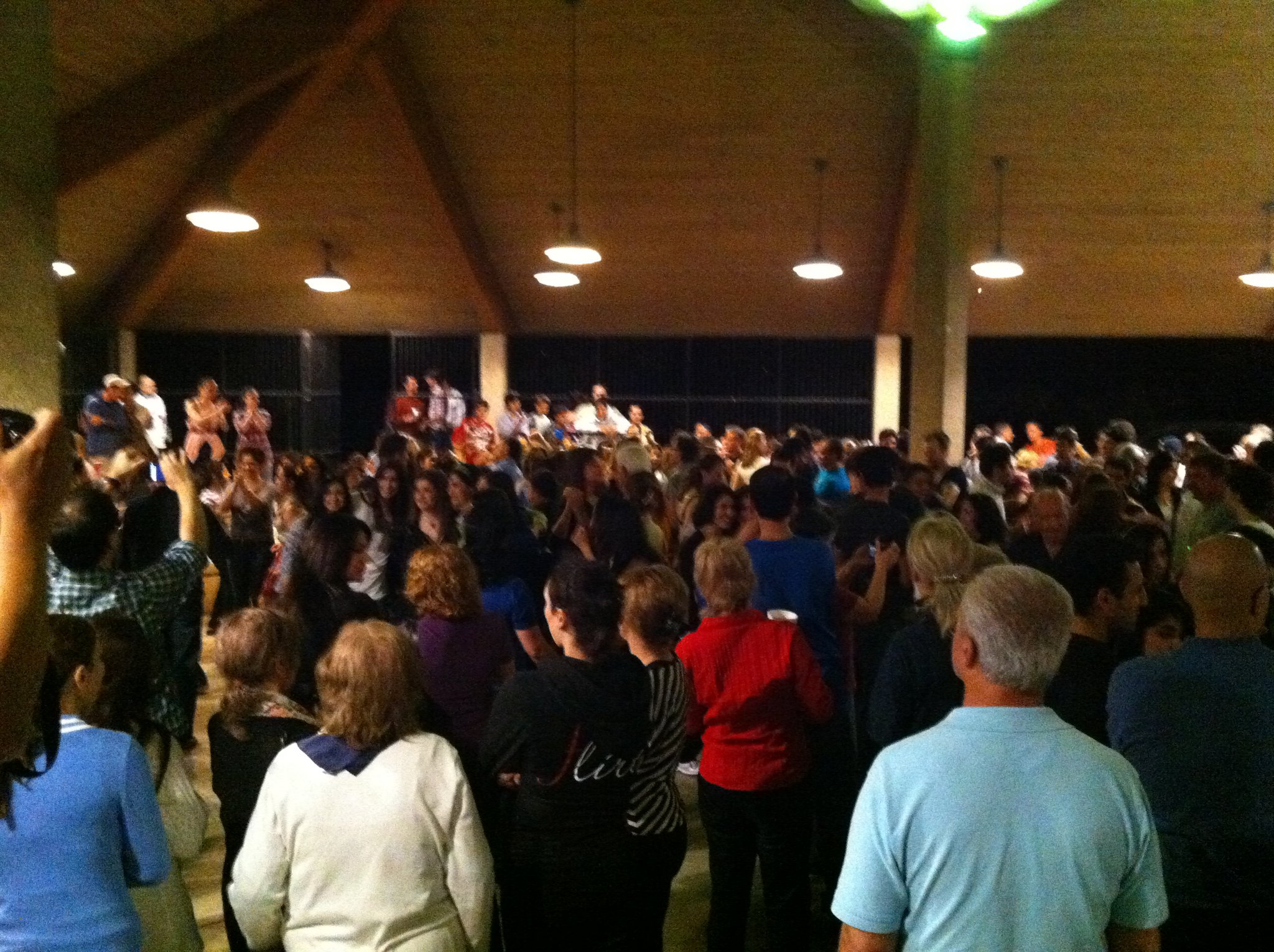
Public party during Chaharshanbe Suri in San Antonio.

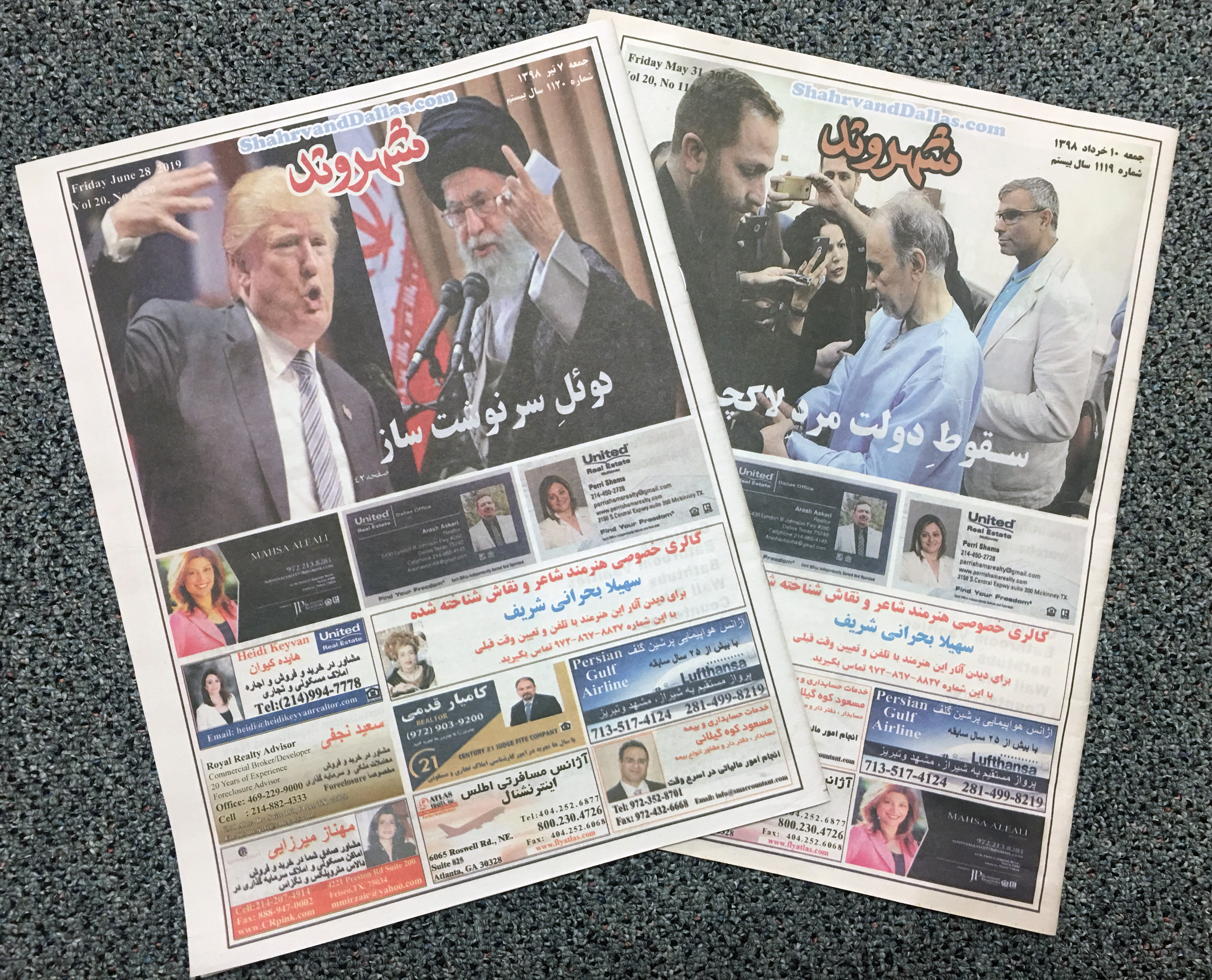
Shahrvand newsletter has been published in Dallas for over 20 years.

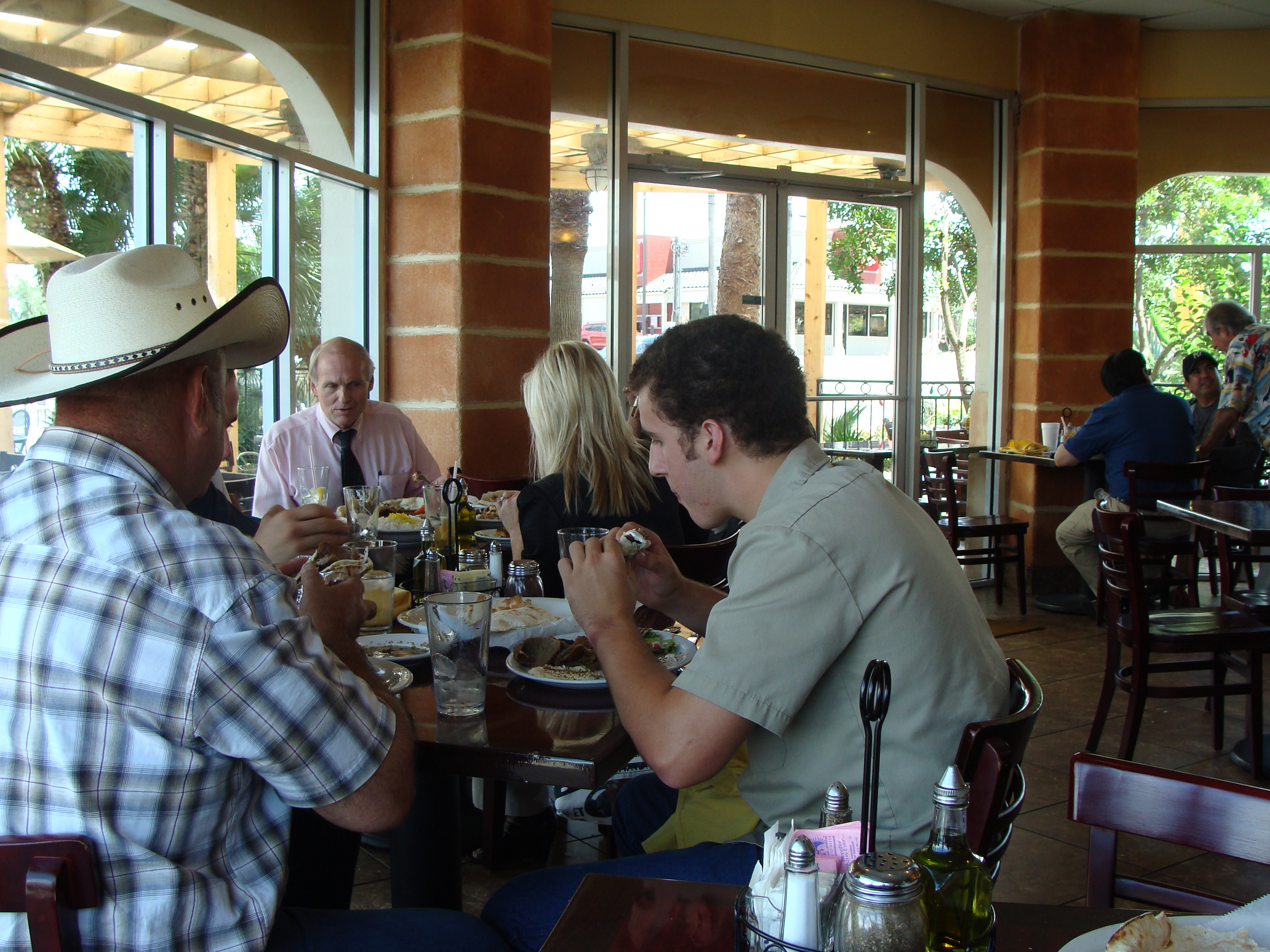
A popular Iranian restaurant in southern Texas.

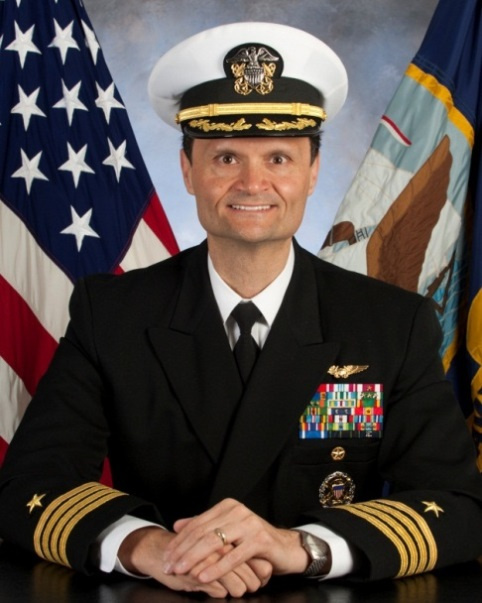
Kavon Hakimzadeh the captain of the USS Harry Truman is a Texan by birth.

=== Religion ===
Many Iranian-Americans are non-Muslim due to the religious composition of those fleeing the Iranian Revolution, which included a disproportionate share of Iran's religious minorities, as well as subsequent ex-Muslim asylum seekers and other conversions away from Islam. Many Iranian Americans identify as irreligious or Shiite, but a full one-fifth are Christians, Jews, Baháʼís, or Zoroastrians. Additionally, there are also some Iranian Mandaeans, but they are very small in number. According to Pew Research, about 22% of those who left Islam in the United States are Iranian Americans.

A 2012 national telephone survey of a sample of 400 Iranian-Americans, commissioned by the Public Affairs Alliance of Iranian Americans and conducted by Zogby Research Services, asked the respondents what their religions were. The responses broke down as follows: Muslim 31%, atheist/realist/humanist 11%, agnostic 8%, Baháʼí 7%, Jewish 5%, Protestant 5%, Roman Catholic 2%, Zoroastrian 2%, "Other" 15%, and "No response" 15%. The survey had a cooperation rate of 31.2%. The margin of error for the results was +/- 5 percentage points, with higher margins of error for sub-groups. Notably, the number of Muslims decreased from 42% in 2008 to 31% in 2012.

According to Harvard University's Robert D. Putnam, the average Iranian is slightly less religious than the average American. In the book Social Movements in 20th Century Iran: Culture, Ideology, and Mobilizing Frameworks, author Stephen C. Poulson adds that Western ideas are making Iranians irreligious.

There are religious and ethnolinguistic differences among the Muslim, Jewish, Baháʼí, Zoroastrian, Christian, Armenian, Azerbaijani, Kurdish, and Assyrian groups. Calculating the percentage of Christian Iranian-Americans is difficult because most Iranian Christians (especially those raised in the faith) are of Armenian or Assyrian origin; and, apart from identifying as Iranian, a number amongst them also strongly self-identifies as Armenian or Assyrian, rather than as (or apart from) Iranian.

=== Ethnicity ===
The majority of Iranian-Americans are ethnic Persians, with sizeable ethnic minorities being Iranian Azerbaijanis, Armenians, Iranian Jews, Kurds, Assyrians, Mandaeans, Turkmen, Baloch, Arabs, among others.

According to Hakimzadeh and Dixon in 2006, members of religious and ethnic minorities such as Baháʼís, Jews, Armenians, and Assyrians were disproportionately represented amongst the early exiles of the 1978–1979 revolution.

=== Citizenship ===
According to DHS, in 2015, 13,114 people born in Iran were issued green cards, while 13,298 were issued one in 2016. In 2015, 10,344 Iranians became naturalized, with a further 9,507 in 2016. Nearly all Iranians who reside in the United States are either citizens (81%) or permanent residents (15%) of the United States (2008 survey). Iranian-Americans regard their culture and heritage as an important component of their day-to-day life and their overall identity within the United States.

== Integration ==
External videos
- The Limits of Whiteness: Iranian Americans and the Everyday Politics of Race
- Race and Racialization in the Iranian Diaspora

Four benchmarks are traditionally used to measure assimilation: language proficiency, intermarriage, spatial concentration, and socio-economic status. Per these criteria, one can determine with a significant degree of confidence that the Iranian-American community has made significant strides in successfully assimilating to a new culture and way of living. According to a survey commissioned by the Public Affairs Alliance of Iranian Americans (PAAIA) in 2008, only 21 percent of Iranian-Americans reported interacting mostly with other Iranian Americans outside of their workplace, demonstrating that most of them have successfully integrated into United States society.

The intermarriage rate is very high among Iranian Americans. It has been estimated that nearly 50 percent of Iranian-Americans who married between 1995 and 2007 married non-Iranian Americans. Research has furthermore indicated that Iranian-Americans who are Muslim are more open to intermarry than those who are members of religious or ethnic minorities, such as Jews and Armenians. Compared to men, Iranian women are less likely to mix or intermarry outside their group, which, according to the PAAIA, is likely because, as a group, they are more likely to adhere to traditional Iranian values, including making marriages that are approved by their families and are within Iranian cultural norms. Regarding language proficiency in the United States among its immigrant groups, the first generation principally speaks their native language, the second generation speaks both English and their parents' language, and the third generation typically speaks only English, while maintaining a knowledge of some isolated words and phrases from their ancestral tongue. The Iranian American community follows this pattern.

=== Community outreach ===
Camp Ayandeh, sponsored annually by the Iranian Alliances Across Borders (IAAB), has attracted children of the Iranian diaspora from multiple nations with the intention of uniting Iranian youth following the mass migration after the fall of the Shah.

=== Education ===
According to Bayor, from the very beginning, Iranian immigrants differed from other arrivals in their high educational and professional achievements. According to census 2000, 50.9 percent of Iranian immigrants have attained a bachelor's degree or higher, compared to a 28.0 percent national average. According to the latest census data available, more than one in four Iranian-Americans holds a master's or doctoral degree, the highest rate among 67 ethnic groups studied.

A 1990 University of California, Los Angeles study showed that by virtue of education and occupation, native-born and Armenian-Americans of Iranian origin "tend to have the highest socioeconomic status... while those from Turkey have the lowest", although Turkish Armenians boast the highest rate of self-employment. In 1988, a New York Times article claimed that Middle Eastern Armenians, which includes Armenians from Iran, preferred to settle in Glendale, California, while Armenian immigrants from the Soviet Union were attracted to Hollywood, Los Angeles.

A study regarding Americans of Armenian descent showed that Armenians from Iran (Iranian-Armenians) are known for quick integration into American society: for example, only 31% of Armenian Americans born in Iran claim not to speak English well, while those Armenians from other nations were shown to have less success at integrating.

=== Occupations and income ===
The Small Business Administration (SBA) conducted a study that found Iranian immigrants among the top 20 immigrant groups with the highest rate of business ownership, contributing substantially to the U.S. economy. According to the report, there were 33,570 active and contributing Iranian American business owners in the U.S., with a 21.5% business ownership rate. The study also found that the total net business income generated by Iranian Americans was $2.56 billion. Almost one in three Iranian-American households have annual incomes of more than $100,000 (compared to one in five for the overall U.S. population). Ali Mostasahri, a founding member of the Iranian Studies Group, offers a reason for the relative success of Iranian-Americans compared to other immigrants. He believes that, unlike many other immigrants who left their home countries because of economic hardships, Iranians left due to social or religious reasons like the 1979 revolution. About 50 percent of all working Iranian Americans are in professional and managerial occupations, a percentage greater than any other group in the United States.

==== Physicians ====
The earliest Iranian people in the U.S. were mostly young trainees who worked as medical interns or residents. Some established themselves to continue practice beyond the residency stage. Their motives to extend their stay in the United States were more for professional than economic reasons. Researchers from Johns Hopkins University in 1974 reported, in the Journal of the American Medical Association, that, in 1971, the number of Iranian physicians in the U.S. was 1,625. The authors further studied the causes for immigration by sending questionnaire to all Iranian MDs in the United States. According to the 660 respondents, the main reasons for migration were mandatory two-years' military service, low salaries as compared to the United States, expensive housing, and socio-political reasons.

In 2013, another report was published, in the Archive of Iranian Medicine (AIM), saying that, post-revolution, the number of Iranian medical school graduates in the United States had grown to 5,045. Those who migrated to the U.S. after the 1979 revolution were mostly experienced physicians who came with their families and an intent to stay permanently. As of 2013, there are 5,050 Iranian medical school graduates in the United States.

Prior to the revolution, the 1,626 physicians migrated to the United States were 15% of all Iranian medical school graduates, while the 5,045 medical graduates who migrated post-Islamic Revolution represent only 5% of total Iranian medical graduates. This is not indicative of the entire United States, merely of the areas in which most of the Iranian-American population is concentrated.

== Politics ==
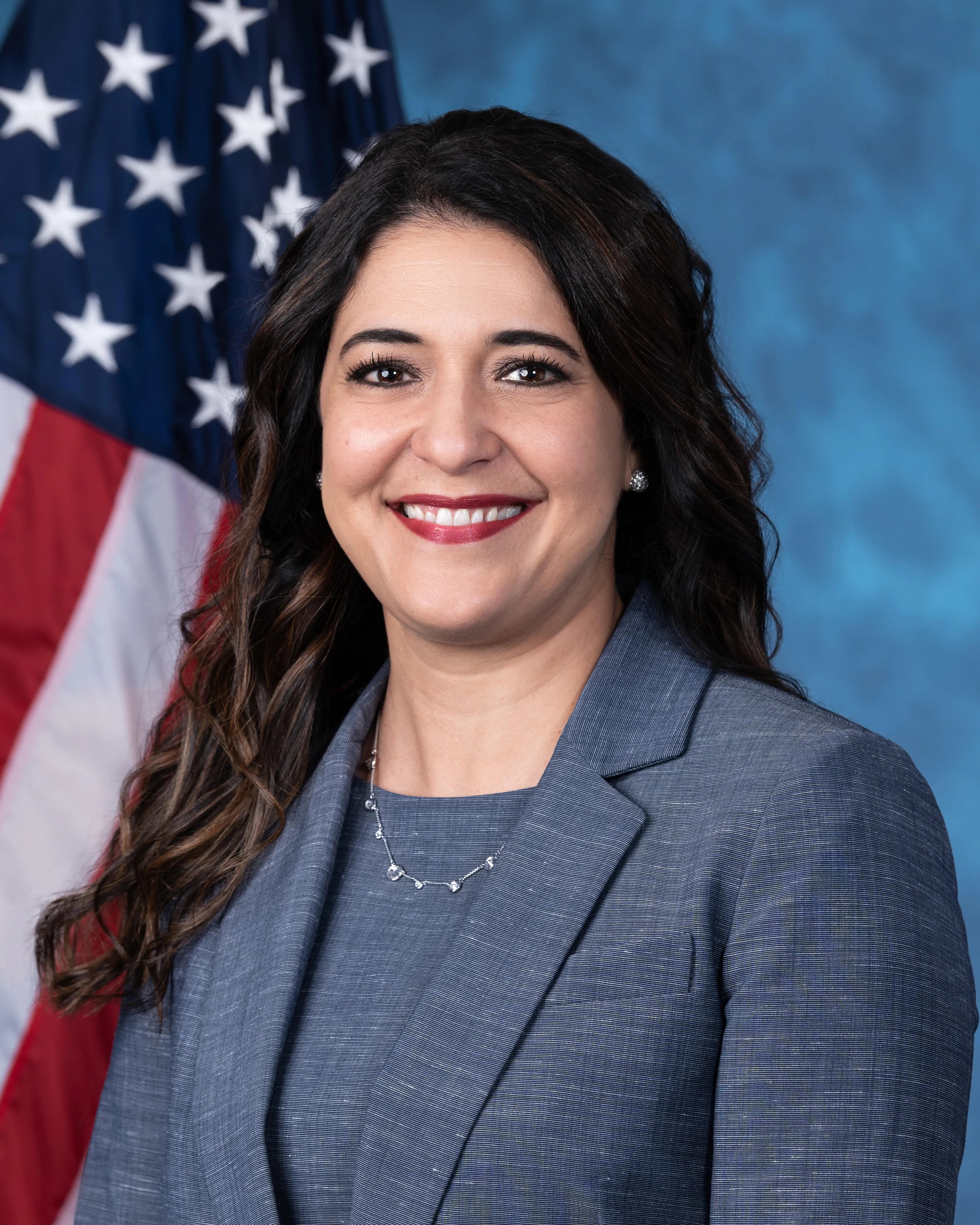
Stephanie Bice the first Iranian American elected to Congress, from the Republican Party.

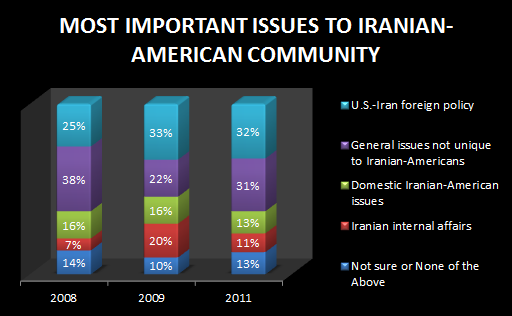
Most important issues to the Iranian-American community

Though Iranian-Americans have historically excelled in business, academia, and the sciences, they have traditionally shied away from participating in American politics or other civic activities. Iranian-Americans do not appear to engage in American politics, as demonstrated by survey results from large cities showing only 10 percent of them voted in the 2004 election.

In Los Angeles, Iranian Americans paid for a billboard to inform thousands of travelers on the 405 freeway of how the Iranian regime had murdered ten thousand political prisoners.

An August 2008 Zogby International poll, commissioned by the Public Affairs Alliance of Iranian Americans, found that approximately one-half of Iranian Americans identified themselves as registered Democrats, in contrast to one in eight as Republicans and one in four as independents (2008). A 2019 Zogby International survey, commissioned by PAAIA, found that in the 2016 presidential election, 56% of Iranian Americans respondents voted for Hillary Clinton, the Democratic candidate. The survey also states that 69% of Iranian American respondents planned to vote for the Democratic candidate in the 2020 election.

The same 2008 PAAIA poll indicates that more than half of Iranian Americans cite domestic U.S. issues, including issues that are not unique to Iranian Americans, as the most important to them. In contrast, one quarter of Iranian Americans cite foreign policy issues involving Iran–U.S. relations and less than one-in-ten cite the internal affairs of Iran as being of greatest importance to them.

More recently, the 2019 Zogby International survey, commissioned by the Public Affairs Alliance of Iranian Americans, found that one-half of Iranian American respondents consider foreign policy most important when voting. This is a significant increase from the one quarter of Iranian Americans that reported foreign policy issues, such as the Iran-U.S. relationship, as important in 2008.

Similarly, the 2019 survey also suggested that 75% of Iranian American respondents perceived the Trump Administration's Iranian foreign policy negatively. In 2017, the Trump administration put strict travel restrictions on travel to the United States from several countries, including Iran. The survey indicates that this travel ban instituted by the Trump administration in 2017, received opposition from 76% of respondents. In contrast, only 16% of respondents supported the ban. The survey states that 70% of respondents have been personally affected by the travel ban, or had family and friends affected by the ban.

The PAAIA survey states that the type of regime that works best for Iran's future is a parliamentary and democratic republic, according to 55% of Iranian-Americans. These individuals have a divided opinion on the approval of the United States strikes to nuclear sites in Iran. 45% agreed with the decision to take these actions; 44% disagreed with this decision; 11% were not sure. The most common reason for disapproving this measure was the fear of civilian casualties.

Following the outbreak of hostilities in early 2026, the Iranian-American community has demonstrated significant opposition to the ongoing military conflict involving the United States, Israel, and Iran. According to the Zogby polling conducted between March 24 and March 27, 2026, approximately 66% of Iranian Americans expressed opposition to the war, while only 33% remained in favor. This data reflects a 16-percentage-point swing from the beginning of the conflict in late February, when the community was nearly evenly split at 49% support and 49% opposition. Observers and community leaders attribute the shift to the escalating civilian casualties and the destruction of infrastructure within Iran, which evoked comparisons to previous regional conflicts. In reports published by The Intercept, Jamal Abdi, president of the NIAC, noted that the survey results challenge the narrative that the diaspora provides a "mandate" for military intervention. The polling further indicated that 61.6% of Iranian Americans favor a diplomatic "off-ramp" and de-escalation. Furthermore, approximately 60% of respondents expressed skepticism regarding the outcomes of U.S.-led regime change, citing concerns that the conflict could lead to state collapse, civil war, or the installation of a worse government rather than a democratic transition.

== Ties to Iran ==
According to a survey conducted in 2009, more than six in ten Iranian Americans have immediate family members in Iran, and almost three in ten communicate with their families or friends in Iran at least several times a week. An additional four in ten communicate with their families or friends in Iran at least several times a month. This study indicates an unusually close relationship between Iranian-Americans and Iranians.

In the updated 2019 PAAIA survey, 15% of Iranian American respondents reported contacting with friends and family in Iran daily, while 26% of respondents communicated with relatives in Iran several times a week. Additionally, 26% of Iranian American respondents contacted with family and friends in Iran several times a month, and 14% communicated with relatives in Iran several times a year. The survey also indicated that 74% of Iranian American respondents preferred contacting their relatives in Iran via phone calls, but communication over mobile communications apps and internet services had increased to 69% and 66% respectively.

As of 2013, U.S. laws require U.S. persons to obtain a license from the U.S. Office of Foreign Assets Control (OFAC) to engage in transactions related to the sale of their personal property in Iran. Similarly, U.S. persons will need a license from OFAC to open a bank account or transfer money to Iran.

=== Travel to Iran ===
The U.S. government does not have diplomatic or consular relations with the Islamic Republic of Iran and therefore cannot provide protection or routine consular services to U.S. citizens in Iran. The Swiss government, acting through its embassy in Tehran, serves as protecting power for U.S. interests in Iran. The Iranian government does not recognize dual citizenship and will not allow the Swiss to provide protective services for U.S. citizens who are also Iranian nationals. The Iranian authorities make the determination of a dual national's Iranian citizenship without regard to personal wishes. In 2016, the U.S. Department of State warned U.S. citizens of the risks of travel to Iran. In some instances, foreigners, in particular dual nationals of Iran and Western countries including the United States, have been detained or prevented from leaving Iran.

== Accomplishments ==
In Los Angeles, Iranians have become the largest ethnic group in many Los Angeles' wealthiest enclaves including Bel Air, Beverly Hills, and Woodland Hills.

The Iranian Revolution resulted in many Iranians fleeing to America in the late 1970s, where, forty years later, Iranian immigrants have become a major force in Silicon Valley as investors, executives, and creators. Iranians have been founders or senior executives at eBay, Oracle, Google, Dropbox, YouTube, Uber, Expedia, Twitter, and other major corporations.

Iranians have the highest percentage of master's degrees than any other ethnic group in the United States. Iranians have also played a large role in the American education system with over 500 Iranian-American professors teaching at top-ranked U.S. universities which include Massachusetts Institute of Technology; Harvard University; University of Pennsylvania, Columbia University, Yale University; Princeton University; University of California, Berkeley; University of California, Los Angeles; and Stanford University.

Iranian philanthropists constructed the Freedom Sculpture in the Century City neighborhood, in honor of the Persian artifact Cyrus Cylinder.

== Representation ==
=== Television ===
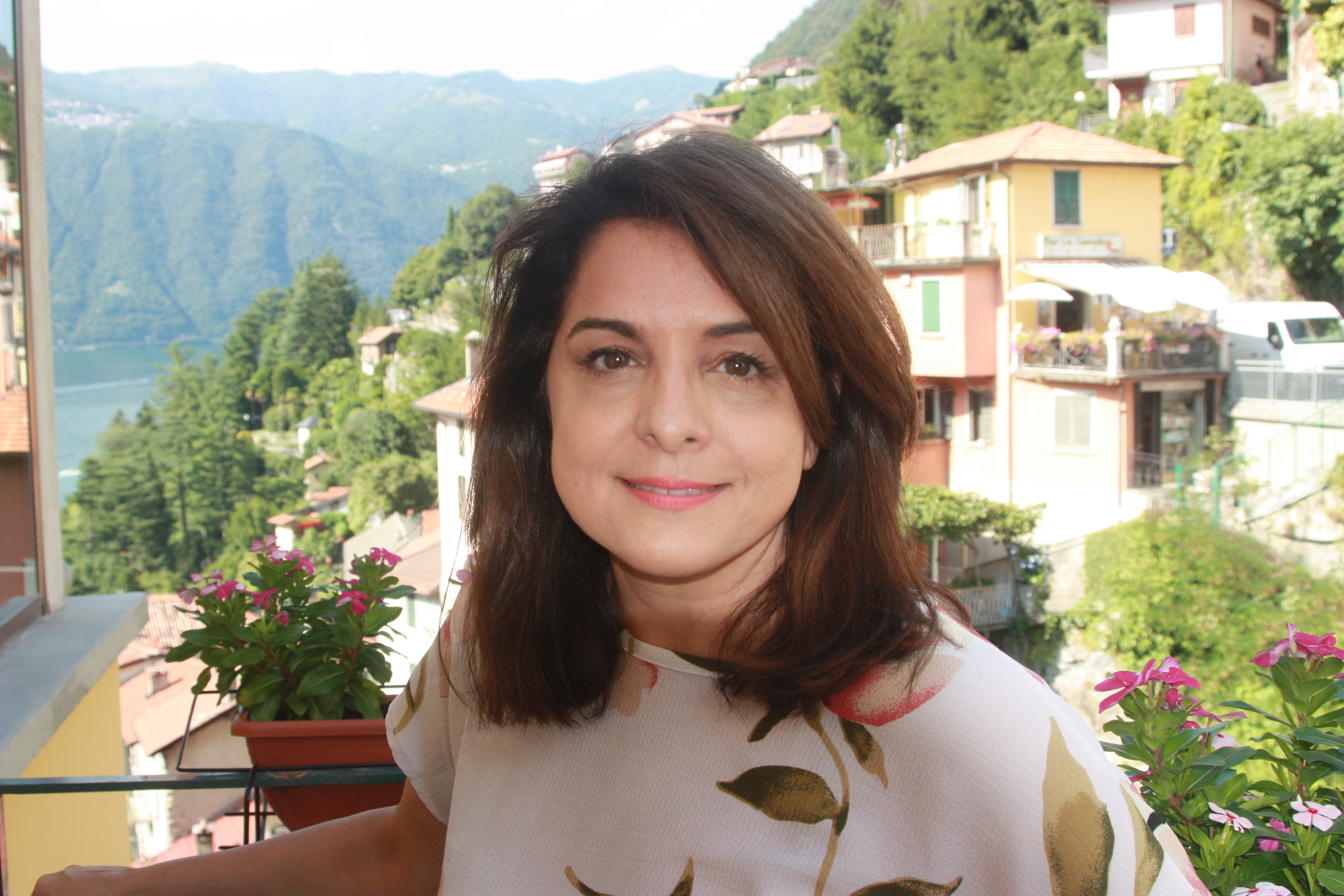
Davar Ardalan, Executive Producer of Audio at National Geographic and longtime journalist at NPR news.

Early Iranian diaspora television has been credited with helping form the local community in the United States. As a result of the Iranian Revolution, the first Iranian American television was formed, and with its formation there were existing political factions that were carried over. The dominant voice in television during this time was from the royalist-support. It was argued by scholar Hamid Naficy, this was not due to political sponsorship, but rather due to market support. Up until 1992, most all Iranian American television programming was in the Farsi language with exceptions to Assyrian and Armenian languages (this included for Iranian-Kurdish and Azeri-specific shows in Farsi). Most all programming was non religious, and this was reflecting the population of more minority religions of Los Angeles. There are no reliable statistics on viewership because "Middle Eastern" and Iranian wasn't defined by rating services (such as Nielsen Holdings). However, the Los Angeles Times estimated that by 1991, the Iranian American population was roughly 800,000, which would indicate the opening of a new share of the television viewing market.

The Long Beach-based independent television station, KSCI-TV dubbed themselves the "international station" and claimed to offer the most diverse ethnic television programming in the early 1980s, including the majority of Iranian American television during this time. Starting on March 15, 1981, the first Iranian diaspora television broadcast show IRTV (acronym for "Iranian television") was created by Ali Limonadi in Los Angeles. Other early Iranian American television programs included Nadar Rafii's Midnight Show; Parviz Sayyad's Parsian TV (on KSCI-TV); Hamid Shabkhiz's Iran; and Manuchehr Bibian's (also known as Manouchehr Bibiyan) Jaam-e-Jam TV channel. Other notables in Iranian American television programs in the 1980s included Shohreh Aqdashlu's Sima va Nava-ye Iran TV; Parviz Kardan's Shahr-e Farang TV; and Hushang Towzi's multiple television series.

In 2013, BravoTV launched Shahs of Sunset which followed a group of six Iranian American friends in Los Angeles who try to juggle their active social lives and careers while also balancing the demands of their families and traditions; the show was accused of racism and relying on stereotypes.

In 2020, the television series Taste the Nation with Padma Lakshmi (season 1, episode 6, "Where The Kabob is Hot") focused on Iranian food in Los Angeles; where Lakshmi interviewed Bottom of the Pot cookbook author, Naz Deravian; Shamshiri Grill owner, Hamid Mosavi; and comedian, Maz Jobrani.

=== Film ===
Iranian Americans have been the focus of film documentaries, including The Iranian Americans (2012; directed by Andrew Goldberg); and Immigration Stories: Iranian Americans of Silicon Valley (2021; directed by Nima Naimi, Alireza Sanayei, Julian Gigola). Critical response in the HuffPost of The Iranian Americans (2012) PBS documentary included a lack of representation for "interracial marriage". The film documentary, The Dawn Is Too Far (2024; directed by Soumyaa Behrens, Persis Karim) follows eight Iranian Americans from the San Francisco Bay Area and their shared experience.

Fictional films with Iranian American themes include the satire Jimmy Vestvood: Amerikan Hero (2014; directed by Jonathan Kesselman), and Shirin in Love (2014; directed by Ramin Niami). The fictional drama Surviving Paradise (2001), is the first English-language Iranian film with theatrical release in the United States; the storyline is about two Iranian refugees in Los Angeles.

=== Education ===
The Center for Iranian Diaspora Studies at San Francisco State University, directed and chaired by Persis Karim, was founded in 2017 and was the first program specifically focused on Iranian diaspora (which includes Iranian Americans). The center offers grants, fellowships, and scholarships, as well as scholarly lecture series, research, and creative performances.

== Discrimination ==
According to the Public Affairs Alliance of Iranian Americans, nearly half of Iranian-Americans surveyed in 2008 by Zogby International have experienced or personally know Iranian Americans who have experienced discrimination due to their ethnicity, religion, or country of origin. The most common types of discrimination reported are airport security check, social discrimination, racial profiling, employment or business discrimination and discrimination at the hands of immigration officials.

In 2009, Martin Kramer, a Harvard professor, warned about the dangers of allowing Iranian Americans to get too close to power during the 2009 American Israel Public Affairs Committee (AIPAC) conference:

In 2009, Merrill Lynch & Co. agreed to pay $1.55 million to resolve a U.S. government lawsuit accusing the bank of discriminating against an Iranian American employee. The government accused the firm of refusing to promote and later firing this employee on the basis of his national origin and religion.

On 8 September 2015, 22-year-old Iranian American Shayan Mazroei was stabbed to death by white supremacist Craig Tanber. Mazroei, who resided in Laguna Niguel, was a successful businessman operating his own car dealership in Santa Ana. On the night of 8 September 2015, Mazroei began discussing his mother visiting Iran to his girlfriend in a restaurant until Elizabeth Anne Thornburg spat on Mazroei shouting racial slurs. Tanber, who would later be sentenced to life in prison, then proceeded to stab Mazroei resulting in his death.

In 2017 in the Kansas City suburb of Olathe, Adam Purinton shot and killed two Indians at a bar, mistaking them for Iranian. While murdering them Purinton yelled "Get out of my country."

In 2018, while on national television, having a discussion about taking a DNA test, Senator Lindsey Graham remarked that it would be "terrible" if he discovered he had Iranian heritage. Graham's statement outraged many high-profile Iranian-Americans, including Omid Kordestani (chairman of Twitter), Ali Partovi, Hadi Partovi and Dana Pishdar (CEOs of Code.org), Pejman Nozad, and British Iranian Christiane Amanpour.

In 2020, the United States Border Patrol instituted a large scale detention of Iranian Americans at the Canadian border without probable cause. While returning to the U.S. from Canada, Americans of Iranian heritage were detained by border officers. Over 60 Americans of Iranian descent were detained and interrogated at the Canadian border. The incident took place during a time of escalated tensions between Iran and the U.S.

== Notable people ==
=== Business and technology ===
Iranian-Americans are among the most educated and successful communities in the U.S., according to a report by the Iranian Studies group at MIT. Iranian-Americans have founded, or hold senior leadership positions at, many major US companies, including Fortune 500 companies such as GE, Intel, Citigroup, Verizon, Motorola, Google, and AT&T. Pierre Omidyar, founder/CEO of eBay is of Iranian origin, as is the founder of Bratz, Isaac Larian. Hamid Biglari is vice-chairman of Citicorp. Bob Miner was the co-founder of Oracle Corporation and the producer of Oracle's relational database management system.Brandon Truaxe was the Founder/CEO of The Ordinary. In 2006, Anousheh Ansari, co-founder of the Ansari X Prize, became the first female space tourist and first Iranian astronaut. Ansari is also the co-founder and former CEO of Prodea Systems, Inc., and Telecom Technologies, Inc. Test pilot Jasmin Moghbeli became the first NASA astronaut of Iranian descent as mission commander of SpaceX Crew-7 and flight engineer aboard the International Space Station for Expedition 69 and Expedition 70 in 2023. In 2024, cardiologist Eiman Jahangir became the first Iranian male astronaut on Blue Origin NS-26. Ahmadreza Rofougaran is a pioneer in RF CMOS technology and the co-founder of Innovent Systems (presently a part of Broadcom).

Other well known Iranian-American entrepreneurs include designer Bijan Pakzad, entrepreneur Sam Nazarian, business executive Hamid Akhavan, former CEO of Unify GmbH & Co. KG (formerly Siemens Enterprise Communications), Omid Kordestani of Twitter and former Senior Vice President of Google, CEO of YouTube Salar Kamangar, Sina Tamaddon of Apple Inc., and Shahram Dabiri Lead Producer for the massively multiplayer online role-playing game (MMORPG) World of Warcraft from 1999 to 2007. Dara Khosrowshahi became CEO of Expedia in August 2005 and then in August 2017, Khosrowshahi became the CEO of Uber, succeeding founder Travis Kalanick. Kam Ghaffarian is the founder of IBX, Axiom Space, Intuitive Machines, and X-energy; he reportedly has a net worth of $2.1 billion.

=== Philanthropy ===
Many Iranian-Americans are active philanthropists and leaders in improving their community. In 2006, the University of Texas M. D. Anderson Cancer Center was the recipient of a $10 million donation from an Iranian-American couple based in Houston, Texas. The University of Southern California was the recipient of a $17 million gift from an Iranian-American, as was San Francisco State University which received a $10 million gift from an Iranian-American couple. Chicago's Swedish Covenant Hospital received $4 million; Portland State University, $8 million; and UC Irvine, $30 million.

=== Academia ===
Notable Iranian-Americans in science include Firouz Naderi, a director at NASA; Ali Javan, inventor of the first gas laser; Maryam Mirzakhani, the first female winner of the Fields Medal; Nima Arkani-Hamed, a leading theoretical physicist; cancer biologist Mina J. Bissell; Gholam A. Peyman, the inventor of LASIK; theoretical physicist Cumrun Vafa; electrical engineer Babak Hassibi; economist Nouriel Roubini; engineer Ali Hajimiri; computational biologist, medical geneticist, and evolutionary geneticist Pardis Sabeti; electrical engineer and computer scientist Vahid Tarokh; Ehsan Afshari; professor and historian George Bournoutian; scientist Nader Engheta; professor Payam Heydari; and Rashid Massumi, M.D., a pioneer in the fields of electrophysiology and cardiology.

Prominent Iranian-Americans in American higher education include:

- Rahmat Shoureshi, researcher, professor, and provost of New York Institute of Technology (NYIT).
- Lotfi Asker Zadeh, founding member of the Eurasian Academy and University of California Berkeley professor.
- Nariman Farvardin, president of Stevens Institute of Technology.
- Vartan Gregorian, educator, and historian and former president of the Carnegie Corporation and the New York Public Library (NYPL).

=== Media ===
Well known American media personalities of Iranian descent include Christiane Amanpour of ABC News and CNN, born in England; Daron Malakian, member of the rock band System of a Down; Susie Gharib, of Nightly Business Report; Roya Hakakian; Yara Shahidi; and Rudi Bakhtiar. There are several Iranian American actors, comedians and filmmakers, including the Academy Award nominee and Emmy Award winner Shohreh Aghdashloo, the award-winning director, producer and screenwriter Cyrus Nowrasteh, screenwriter Arash Amel, actresses Tala Ashe, Catherine Bell, Sarah Shahi, Nadia Bjorlin, Nasim Pedrad, Desiree Akhavan, Sheila Vand, Necar Zadegan, Medalion Rahimi, and Bahar Soomekh, actors Adrian Pasdar, Shaun Toub, Arian Moayed, Navid Negahban, Reza Sixo Safai, Rostam Batmanglij, and Em Beihold, comedians Max Amini, Maz Jobrani and Tehran Von Ghasri, filmmakers Bavand Karim and Kamshad Kooshan, producers Bob Yari and Farhad Safinia, author and performer Shahram Shiva, and artist and filmmaker Daryush Shokof. Notable children's media writer/director Shabnam Rezaei has created several children's TV series on Hulu and PBSKids. There are also notable American YouTube personalities of Iranian descent, including JonTron.

=== Medicine ===
Abol Ghassem Bakhtiar (1872–1971) was an Iranian physician that moved to the United States in 1918 to attend medical school, he later returned to Iran and was the founder of faculty of Tehran University of Medical Sciences.

Sayyed Bozorg Mahmoody, an Iranian anesthesiologist is known for taking American wife Betty and daughter Mahtob to Iran in mid-1980s and keeping them there for eighteen months, as documented in the book Not Without My Daughter (1987).

=== Sports ===
Professional tennis player Andre Agassi, NFL football players T. J. Houshmandzadeh, David Bakhtiari and Shar Pourdanesh, professional wrestlers Shawn Daivari and The Iron Sheik, professional mixed martial artist Amir Sadollah, professional soccer players Alecko Eskandarian and Steven Beitashour, professional soccer coaches Jalal Talebi and Afshin Ghotbi, and professional basketball player Behdad Sami.

=== Politics ===
The son of the late Shah of Iran, Reza Pahlavi, as well as several high-ranking officials in the Shah's administration, such as Hushang Ansary and Jamshid Amouzegar live or have lived in the United States. Goli Ameri is the Under Secretary General for Humanitarian Affairs of the International Federation of Red Cross and Red Crescent Societies, as well as the former U.S. Assistant Secretary of State for Educational and Cultural Affairs from 2008 to 2009, during which she was the highest-ranking Iranian-American public official in the United States. Drug policy expert Kevin Sabet is Iranian-American and the only person to serve as an appointee in the drug czar's office of George W. Bush and Barack Obama. Beverly Hills elected its first Iranian-born Mayor, Jimmy Delshad, in 2007. Bob Yousefian served as the mayor of Glendale, California from 2004 to 2005. In November 2011, Anna M. Kaplan was elected Councilwoman in the Town of North Hempstead, New York, becoming the first Iranian-American to be elected to a major municipal office in New York State. Cyrus Amir-Mokri, who was appointed as the Treasury Department Assistant Secretary for Financial Institutions by President Obama, is the highest ranking Iranian-American official in government as of 2012. In November 2012, Cyrus Habib of Washington state and Adrin Nazarian of California became the first Iranian-Americans elected to state legislatures. Habib rose to the position of Lieutenant Governor of Washington before leaving politics to join the Jesuit order, becoming the first Iranian-American elected to any statewide office. Following the 2020 House elections, Republican Oklahoma Representative Stephanie Bice became the first Iranian-American elected to Congress. Following the 2024 House elections, Arizona Democratic Representative Yassamin Ansari, became the second Iranian-American elected to Congress and the youngest woman elected to the 119th Congress.

Roozbeh Farahanipour, Iranian-American activist, media personality, West Los Angeles Chamber of Commerce CEO, Glorious Frontiers Party co founder, business owners, Polititon.

Azadeh Shahshahani is a human rights attorney based in Atlanta and is a former president of the National Lawyers Guild.

== See also ==
- Iranian diaspora
- Iranian nationality law
- Iranian Psychological Association of America
- Iran–United States relations
- List of Iran-related topics
- List of Persia-related topics
- List of Iranian women
- Little Persia, Los Angeles, California
- Mandaean Americans
- Middle Eastern Americans
- Not Without My Daughter
- National Iranian American Council
- Shirzanan
- Tehrangeles
- History of Iranian Americans in Los Angeles
- Roozbeh Farahanipour

== Sources ==
- Bakalian, Anny (1993). Armenian Americans: From Being to Feeling Armenian. New Brunswick, New Jersey: Transaction Publishers. ISBN 978-1-56000-025-9.
- Bayor, Ronald H. (2011). Multicultural America: An Encyclopedia of the Newest Americans. ABC-CLIO. ISBN 978-0-313-35787-9.
- Bozorgmehr, Mehdi., Sabagh, Georges (1988). High Status Immigrants: A Statistical Profile of Iranians in the United States, Iranian Studies.
- Sabagh, Georges; Bozorgmehr, Mehdi; Der-Martirosian, Claudia (1990). Subethnicity: Armenians in Los Angeles. Institute for Social Science Research, University of California Los Angeles.
- Samkian, Artineh (2007). Constructing Identities, Perceiving Lives: Armenian High School Students' Perceptions of Identity and Education. ISBN 978-0-549-48257-4.
