= Sakineh (Simin) M. Redjali =

Iranian–American psychologist and author (1934–2025)

- سکینه سیمین رجالی
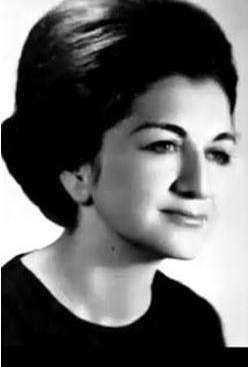
- Born: 1934; Tehran, Persia
- Died: 15 October 2025 (aged 91) near Washington, D.C., U.S.
- Education: University of Tehran; Heidelberg University
- Occupations: Psychologist, author
- Spouse: Saeid Khadiri
- Children: 2
- Family: Farah Pahlavi

Sakineh Simin M. Redjali (Persian: سکینه سیمین رجالی; 1934 – 15 October 2025) was an Iranian–American psychologist and author. Simin Redjali was the first female professor of National University of Iran. She published her autobiography A Symphony of Life : triumph of education over adversity, a journey of a Persian-American woman through war, love, revolution and freedom in 2013.

== Early life and family ==
Sakineh Mostafavi Redjali was born in Tehran, Persia in 1934, to an old aristocrat family. Her father, Ali Reza, and her mother Fatemeh, were titled by the Shah of Persia as Jalaelmolk and Sharafatdole, both honors of the government. Redjali's grandfather, Haji Mirza Mohammed Taghi Dabir-al- Doleh was a member of Dar-al-Shora Kobra (council of Ministers) and an able servant of Naser al-Din Shah Qajar's court.

== Education ==
Redjali earned a BA in educational science and philosophy from the University of Tehran in 1955. She earned a PhD in education, clinical psychology and sociology from the University of Heidelberg in 1961. She completed her post-doctoral fellowship at the University of London in 1963. She completed a research program in psychology and programmed learning in 1967 and was a licensed clinical psychologist.

== Career ==
Between 1963 and 1979 Redjali was professor of psychology at the National University of Iran. As secretary general of the Women's Organization of Iran from 1969 to 1971 she helped establish 180 family welfare centers throughout Iran. Between 1973 and 1979 she was president of Shemiran College, Iran.

From 1979 to 1992 she was center director for the Child Development Center and Adult Training Center in Lynchburg, Virginia, progressing to research director from 1992 to 1995. Between 1992 and 1996 she was on the clinical faculty of the Medical College of Richmond's psychiatry dept and was a clinical associate for the South Eastern Rural Mental Health Research Center, University of Virginia. From 1995 to 1996 she was director of staff development and research at Northern Virginia Mental Health Institute, Virginia.

From 1996 to 2009 Redjali conducted research and consulted in the field of mental health, developmental disabilities, behavioral science and dual diagnosis. Between 1998 and 2000 she was on the board of directors for the Virginia Chapter of American Association on Mental Retardation.

== Death ==
Redjali died on 15 October 2025, at the age of 91.

== Honors and awards ==
Year	Award / honour	Awarding body
1956–1961	Academic scholarship	University of Heidelberg
1962–1963	Cento Fellowship	University of London, Institute of Education
1966	National Science Foundation fellowship for psychology	University of Michigan
1971	2500th Anniversary Medal for the research in the role of women in education and women studies	Iranian Monarch
1973	Tadj and Haftpaykar medals	For 19 years of volunteer services to children's special education
1977	Pahlavi Medal	Ministry of Higher Education for Excellence of Academic Achievement of Shemiran College
1984, 1989, 1994	Service Award	Commonwealth of Virginia
1996	Fellow	American Association on Intellectual and Developmental Disabilities (AAIDD, former AAMR)

== Publications ==
=== Books ===
- Bereday, George Z F (1965). The Education Explosion. New York, USA: Harcourt, Brace and World, Inc. - contributor
- Redjali, S M (1969). Psychology of Teachers. Iran: National University of Iran Press.
- Iran and the West: a critical bibliography. Madrid, Spain: Sirus Ghani. 1970. - contributor
- Redjali, S M (1978). Readings in Psychology. Iran: Shemiran College Press.
- Neville Postlethwaite, T (1988). Education System of Iran, The Encyclopedia of Comparative Education and National Systems of Education. Oxford, UK: Pergamon Press. p. 364-369. - contributor
- Redjali, S M (2013). A Symphony of Life : triumph of education over adversity, a journey of a Persian-American woman through war, love, revolution and freedom.

=== Journals ===
- Journal of Mental Health
- Journal of Mental Retardation
- Journal of Association of Public Developmental Disabilities
- Journal of Psychology, Iranian Psychological Association
- World Yearbook of Education of Teachers College
