= The Secret of Divine Civilization =

1875 book written anonymously by ʻAbdu'l-Bahá

The Secret of Divine Civilization is a book written anonymously by ʻAbdu'l-Bahá in 1875, addressed to the rulers and the people of Persia, but can be applied to developmental reform in any society. It is considered to be part of the authoritative religious text of the Baháʼí Faith. The work was lithographed in Bombay in 1882 and received wide circulation in Iran under the Persian title Risali-yi-madaniyyih or the Treatise on Civilization.

== Background ==
The first English translation was published in London in 1910, and Chicago in 1918, under the title Mysterious Forces of Civilization written by "an Eminent Bahai Philosopher", who states that his purpose for remaining anonymous is to promote the general welfare. The currently used translation was completed by Marzieh Gail and published in 1957, with an introduction by Horace Holley. A new translation is included in Abdu'l-Baha Principles for Progress, tr. Sen McGlinn, Leiden University Press, 2018. According to Peter Smith, "the book was written at a time when genuine reform of Iran seemed possible as Mirza Husayn Khan was still politically influential and Nasser al-Din Shah Qajar had just made his first visit to Europe" in 1873. The reform process petered out in the late 1870s and ʻAbdu'l-Bahá did not pursue his plan to write other books on related themes such as education.

See the full online text here.

== Overview ==
The book was widely known in its time as an attempt to improve the degraded condition of Persia. The author frequently references current issues that were being debated, such as whether to modernize and accept Western technology, or to reject Western culture and rely on technology developed in Persia and the Islamic world.

Among the topics discussed is the honor of an individual and a nation. "The happiness and pride of a nation consist in this, that it should shine out like the sun in the high heaven of knowledge... And the honor and distinction of the individual consist in this, that he among all the world's multitudes should become a source of social good." The text highlights the importance of a nations ability to learn from its history, and from other nations in the formation of its social structure, and the importance of education and altruism of the nation's individuals.

Attention is also given to the reformation of academic curriculum and the methods of studying, advising that schools and universities should stay away from idle disputes and debates on subjects that are based on pure supposition which are not relevant to the current societies need, and that certain valuable subjects are neglected in the process. His counsel on this is that "the individual should, prior to engaging in the study of any subject, ask himself what its uses are and what fruit and result will derive from it. If it is a useful branch of knowledge, that is, if society will gain important benefits from it, then he should certainly pursue it with all his heart."
