= Marzieh Gail =

Persian-American Bahá'i writer and translator

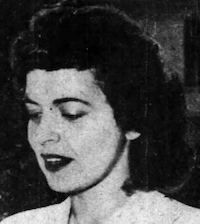
- Marzieh Gail, from a 1945 newspaper photo
- Born: Marzieh Khanum; 1 April 1908 near Boston, Massachusetts, US
- Died: 16 October 1993 (aged 85); San Francisco, California, US
- Other names: Marzia Nabil Khan, Marzia Nabil Carpenter, Mardiyyih Nabil
- Occupations: Writer, translator
- Spouse(s): Howard Carpenter (d. 1935); Harold Gail (d. 1992)
- Parents: Mirza Ali Kuli Khan Zarabi (father); Florence Breed Khan (mother)
- Relatives: Alice Ives Breed (grandmother); Abdorahim-khan kalantar Zarabi (grandfather)

Marzieh Gail (1 April 1908 – 16 October 1993), born Marzieh Nabil Khan, was an American Bahá'i writer and translator of Persian descent.

== Early life ==
Marzieh Khan was one of the three children of Mirza Ali Kuli Khan Zarabi (Nabil-Al-Dawla) Iranian diplomat and Florence Breed Khan. Her father was a diplomat from Iran; her mother was an American Bahá'i convert and diplomatic hostess. Her grandmother, Alice Ives Breed, was a Boston clubwoman and socialite. Her grandfather, Abdorahim-khan Zarabi, was historian, writer, poet and painter and sheriff.

As a child, Khan lived in Washington, D.C., Paris, Tehran, Istanbul, and Tbilisi, because of her father's work. Khan attended Vassar College, Mills College, and Stanford University, graduating from the last of these in 1929. She earned a master's degree in English in 1932, at the University of California, Berkeley.

== Career ==
Khan was an early admirer of Shoghi Effendi, longtime head of the Bahá'i Faith. She and her first husband went to Iran to teach Bahá'i classes. Gail was an early woman journalist in Tehran. After her husband's death, she concentrated on translating Bahá'i texts. From 1936 to 1939, she taught summer classes at Louhelen Baháʼí School in Michigan. During World War II, she did translation work for the Office of War Information. In the 1950s, with her second husband, she worked on Bahá'i projects in France, Austria, and the Netherlands.

Gail's writing included three books about the fourteenth century, books on Bahá'i topics, newspaper articles, and magazine essays. She translated several Bahá'i texts into English.

== Selected works by Gail ==
- Persia and the Victorians (1951)
- Six Lessons in Islam (1953)
- Bahá'i Glossary (1955)
- The Sheltering Branch (1959)
- Avignon in Flower, 1309-1403 (1966)
- Life in the Renaissance (1968)
- The Three Popes (1969)
- Khanum, The Greatest Holy Leaf (1981)
- Dawn Over Mount Hira, and other essays (1976)

Gail also wrote three family memoirs, Other People, Other Places (1982), Summon Up Remembrance (1987), and Arches of the Years (1991). She edited an autobiography by fellow American Bahá'i Juliet Thompson.

Gail translated The Seven Valleys and Four Valleys (1945) (as a combined text), The Secret of Divine Civilization (1957, with her father), Memorials of the Faithful (1971), Selections from the Writings of 'Abdu'l-Bahá (1976), My Memories of Bahá'u'lláh (1982).

== Personal life ==
Marzieh Khan married Howard Luxmoore Carpenter, a medical doctor, in 1929. Carpenter was paralyzed by polio while the couple were living in Iran. He died in 1935. She married again in 1939, to Harold Gail. They lived in California. She was widowed again when he died in 1992; she died in 1993, aged 85 years, in San Francisco.
