= Chargé d'affaires =

Head of diplomatic mission when no higher official exists

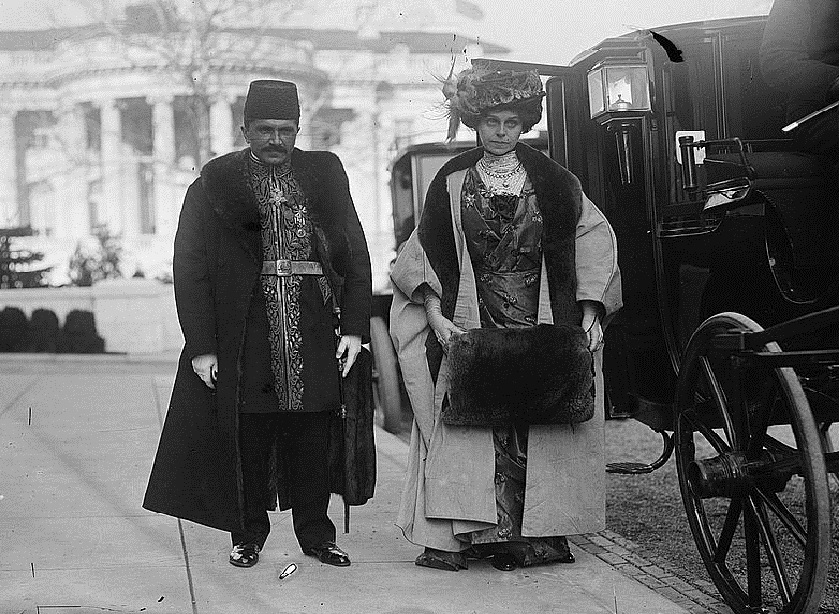
Persia's chargé d'affaires, Mirza Ali-Qoli Khan and his wife visiting U.S. President Woodrow Wilson at the White House in May 1913

A chargé d'affaires (French pronunciation: [ʃaʁʒe dafɛʁ]), plural chargés d'affaires, often shortened to chargé (French) and sometimes in colloquial English to charge-D, is a diplomat who serves as an embassy's chief of mission in the absence of the ambassador. The term is French for "person charged with business", meaning they are responsible for the duties of an ambassador. Chargé is masculine in gender; the feminine form is chargée d'affaires (pronounced the same way).

A chargé enjoys the same privileges and immunities as an ambassador under international law, and normally these extend to their aides as well. However, chargés d'affaires are outranked by ambassadors and have lower precedence at formal diplomatic events. In most cases, a diplomat serves as a chargé d'affaires on a temporary basis in the absence of the ambassador. In unusual situations, in cases where disputes between the two countries make it impossible or undesirable to send agents of a higher diplomatic rank, a chargé d'affaires may be appointed for an indefinite period.

== Types of chargés ==
Chargés d'affaires ad interim ("a. i.") are those who temporarily head a diplomatic mission in the absence of the accredited head of that mission. It is usual to appoint a minister-counsellor, counsellor, or embassy secretary as chargé d'affaires ad interim, and that person is presented to the foreign minister of the receiving state. By definition, chargés d'affaires ad interim do not possess diplomatic credentials.

Chargés d'affaires en pied ("e. p.") are appointed to be permanent heads of mission, in cases where the two countries lack ambassadorial-level relations. They are appointed by letters of credence from the foreign minister of the sending state to the foreign minister of the receiving state. Chargés d'affaires en pied have precedence over chargés d'affaires ad interim, but are outranked by ambassadors. They are sometimes referred to as chargés d'affaires ad hoc or en titre.

== Long-term chargé-level relations ==
In certain cases, a chargé d'affaires may be appointed for long periods, such as when a mission is headed by a non-resident ambassador who is accredited to multiple countries. In addition, a mission may be downgraded from an ambassadorial to a chargé d'affaires level to show displeasure, yet avoid taking the extremely serious step of breaking diplomatic relations. For example, Saudi Arabia and Thailand did not exchange ambassadors between 1989 and 2022, due to the Blue Diamond Affair. The Holy See recalled the ambassador to Taipei right after United Nations General Assembly Resolution 2758 ceased to recognize the Republic of China as the sole legitimate representative of China, and thus chargé d'affaires becomes the most top-ranked de facto envoy to Taipei since then (the ambassador did not leave his position until 1979).

Sometimes when diplomatic recognition is extended to a new government, a chargé may be sent to immediately establish diplomatic representation. However, if a timely exchange of ambassadors does not take place, this may result in a prolonged period of chargé-level relations. For example, the United Kingdom recognized the People's Republic of China in 1950 and posted a chargé d'affaires in the new capital of Beijing. However, China was unwilling to exchange ambassadors until the United Kingdom withdrew its consulate from Taipei. Sino-British relations were not upgraded to the ambassadorial level until 1972.

Since a chargé d'affaires presents his or her credentials to the foreign minister rather than the head of state, the appointment of a chargé may avoid a politically sensitive meeting that would imply approval or recognition of that head of state or government. Similarly, the receiving country may decline to receive an ambassador, but still maintain diplomatic relations by accepting a chargé. For example, the Republic of Cyprus appoints a number of chargés d'affaires en pied to its embassies abroad.

== History ==
In modern use, chargés d'affaires essentially differ from ambassadors in that, like all diplomats, chargés represent their nation, but unlike an ambassador, they are not personal representatives of their head of state. Apart from rank and precedence, chargés enjoy the same privileges and immunities as other diplomatic agents.

However, there have been rare historical circumstances in which the title chargé d'affaires was in fact employed in a more significant colonial role, as commonly held by a resident. Thus, in Annam-Tonkin (most of present Vietnam), the first French chargé d'affaires at Huế, the local ruler's capital, since 1875, one of them (three terms) was appointed the first resident-general on 11 June 1884, as they stopped being tributary to the Chinese Empire, less than a year after the 25 August 1883 French protectorates over Annam and Tonkin (central and northern regions).

In French, chargé d'affaires may be used outside diplomacy to designate an individual with some more or less temporary responsibility for a specific area of business, understood broadly.

== Spelling and grammar ==
Chargé d'affaires generally follows French usage: chargé d'affaires is singular, chargés d'affaires for plural. The "d'affaires" is always in the plural form, and should be lowercase even if Chargé is capitalized. Following the French declension, chargée d'affaires (with the feminine ending) may be seen where the chargé is female.

For temporary chargés, ad interim may or may not be added depending on the context, but is always lower case; it may be italicized or shortened to simply a.i.

== See also ==
- Ambassador
- Attaché
- Head of mission
- High Commissioner (Commonwealth)
