= Kavon Hakimzadeh =

U.S. Navy admiral (born 1968)

- کیوان حکیم‌زاده
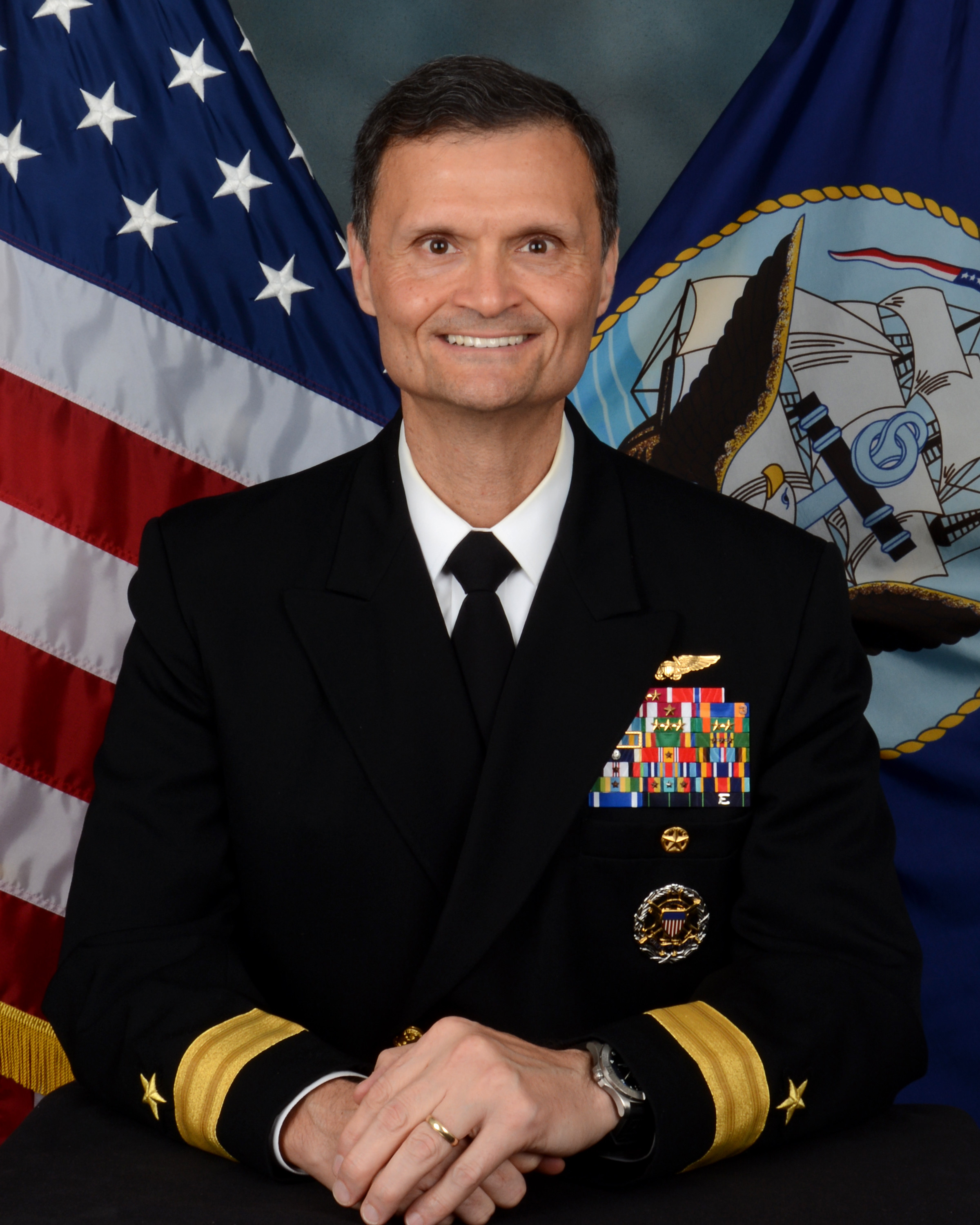
- Official portrait, 2022
- Born: 1968; Texas, United States
- Education: Naval Nuclear Power School; Carnegie Mellon University; Johns Hopkins University; Old Dominion University
- Children: 1
- Military career
- Branch: United States Navy
- Rank: Rear Admiral (lower half)
- Nickname: Hak
- Awards: Legion of Merit; Defense Meritorious Service Medal

Kavon "Hak" Hakimzadeh (Persian: کیوان حکیم‌زاده) (born 1968) is an Iranian-American rear admiral in the US Navy. He has served as the commander of Carrier Strike Group 2 since June 16, 2024. He served as the director of joint/fleet operations of the United States Fleet Forces Command from 2022 to 2024, and as the director of aircraft carrier requirements in the office of the Chief of Naval Operations from 2021 to 2022. He previously served as commanding officer of the USS Harry S. Truman aircraft carrier from 2019 to 2021. On February 1, 2022, he was nominated for promotion to rear admiral.

== Early life ==
Kavon Hakimzadeh was born in Texas in the 1960s to an Iranian father and American mother. When he was a baby, his family moved to Iran.

Hakimzadeh attended an international school where they spoke both Persian and English. He kept the faith of his Southern Baptist mother.

Hakimzadeh lived in Iran until 1979, when his family was forced to flee to the United States during the Islamic Revolution.

== Military career ==
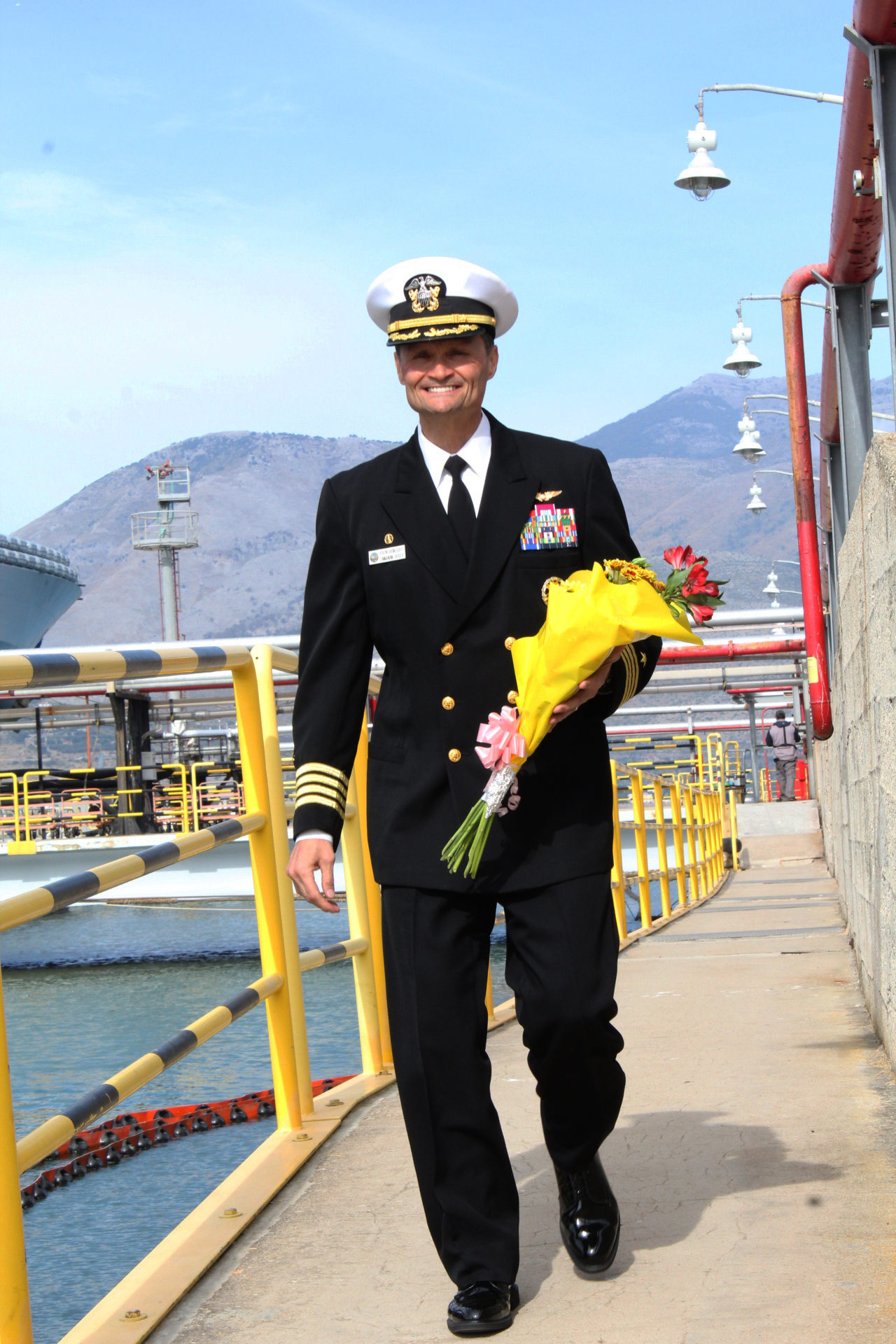
Capt. Kavon Hakimzadeh, commanding officer of the Blue Ridge-class amphibious command ship USS Mount Whitney (LCC 20) carries a bouquet of flowers for his wife following the ship's arrival at its forward-deployed port of Gaeta, Italy Oct. 27, 2017.

Hakimzadeh enlisted in the Navy in 1987 and earned a Navy ROTC scholarship to Carnegie Mellon University. Upon commission, he became a flight officer on the E-2 Hawkeye. He later joined the Tigertails for his initial sea tour. Additional sea duty assignments include Carrier Strike Group Eight as Flag Lieutenant, VAW-123 Screwtops as a department head and VAW-126 Seahawks as executive officer and commanding officer. These tours included multiple deployments aboard USS Enterprise (CVN-65), USS Dwight D. Eisenhower (CVN-69), USS Theodore Roosevelt (CVN-71) and USS Harry S. Truman (CVN-75).

He served ashore with the VAW-120 Greyhawks as an FRS instructor, as a student at the Naval War College, and duty under instruction as an Arthur S. Moreau fellow. He completed three Pentagon assignments with the Joint Staff (J-3) readiness division, SOUTHCOM Washington field office and OPNAV N00X and N9I as a strike warfare analyst and assessment branch head.

Hakimzadeh holds master's degrees from Old Dominion University, the Naval War College and the Johns Hopkins University School of Advanced International Studies. He is a joint qualified officer and has completed the Aviation Nuclear Officer training pipeline.

He began serving as director of aircraft carrier requirements in the office of the Chief of Naval Operations in August 2021. His command tours include the USS Harry S. Truman (CVN-75) from 2019 to 2021 and the USS Mount Whitney (LCC-20) from 2016 to 2018. He served as executive assistant to the director of air warfare in the office of the Chief of Naval Operations from 2018 to 2019 and as executive officer of the USS John C. Stennis (CVN-74) from 2014 to 2016.

In June of 2024, he was assigned as commander of Carrier Strike Group Two and oversaw its operations in the Red Sea for a few days, with the squadron withdrawing from the combat area on June 22, 2024.
