= Shirzanan =

Shirzanan logo

Shirzanan (شير زنان or literally 'heroines' in Persian) was an online weekly magazine and the first publication on Iranian women's sports. It existed from 2007 to 2009.

== History and profile ==
Shirzanan's first issue was published online on 21 May 2007 in New York City. It was published every week on Saturday and it covered news on women's sports within and outside Iran and it covered national and international women's sports issues in these sections:

- news reports
- editorials
- interviews
- photos
- video reports

The website explains its origins in this way: “In the year 2000 that the idea of this weekly magazine was presented to the Ministry of Culture and Islamic Guidance (in Iran) in order to get the publication permission. After 4 years of bureaucratic process and endless hardship the proposal for a sport magazine dedicated to women’s sports was rejected.”

In addition Shirzanan writes: “The first Iranian women’s sports weekly magazine, Shirzanan, aimed to fill the lack of the news coverage in the national media on women's sports in Iran. Shirzanan was a private magazine.” Shirzanan's editorial board included journalists and reporters who have been working closely with Iran's national press.

One of the most significant features of Shirzanan was its photo report page. It was the first time that the images of Iranian women's national teams - in different fields - were published. Shirzanan also has an English version, which translated its main page from Persian to English.

== Editorial Board ==
Shirzanan's permanent editorial board members were:

- Solmaz Sharif (Editor in Chief)
- Marjan Namazi (World News Executive)
- Shabnam Shakorian (National News Reporter)
- Maryam Majd (Photographer)
- Roja Najafi (English Page Executive)
