= Alice Ives Breed =

American social leader, salonnière and clubwoman

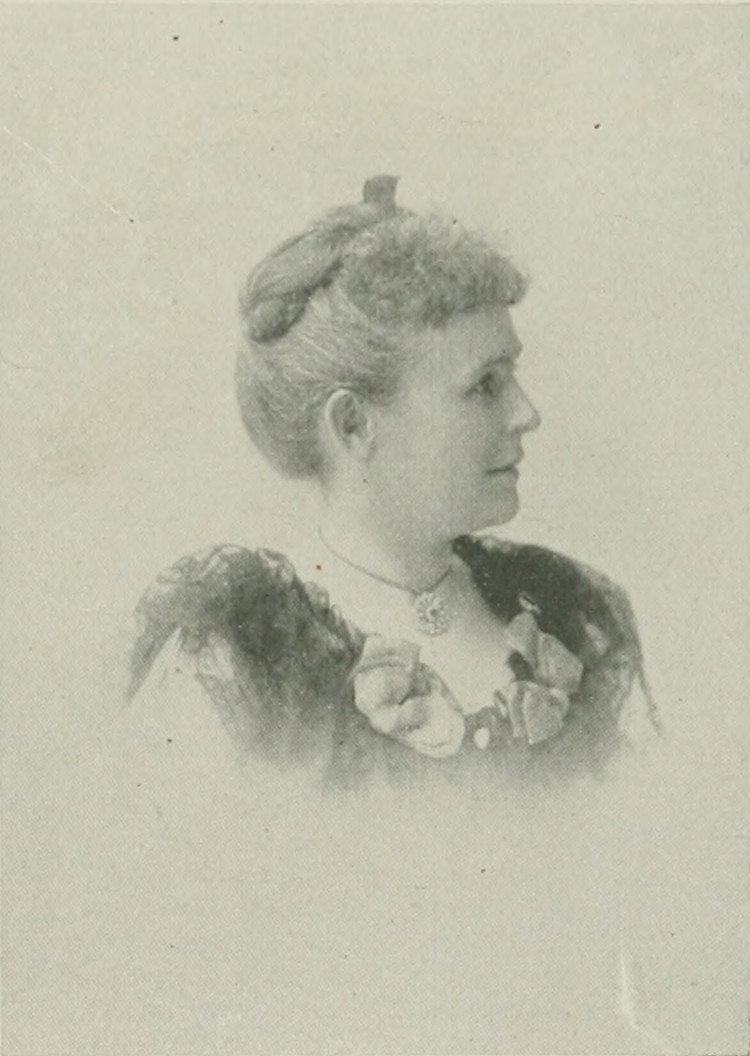
Alice Ives Breed, "A Woman of the Century"

Alice Ives Breed (January 15, 1853 – October 16, 1933) was an American social leader, salonnière, and clubwoman. She excelled as an organizer, using her executive abilities in religious, philanthropic, literary and social channels, aiming to improve the community.

Breed was conversant with the entire history of the club movement. She was a member of or held leadership positions in the Browning Club, Daughters of the American Revolution (D.A.R.), Emergency Association, General Federation of Women's Clubs, Lynn Woman's Club, Massachusetts Society of the Sons and Daughters of Illinois, Massachusetts State Committee of Correspondence of the General Federation of Women's Literary Clubs, North Shore Club, Woman's Auxiliary of the YMCA, Woman's Club House Association, and the Women's Committee of the World's Congress Auxiliary on moral and social reform.

== Early years and education ==
Alice Ives was born in Pavilion, Illinois, January 15, 1853. Her parents were Franklin Benedict Ives, one of the first pupils to be graduated from the Rush Medical College of Chicago, and Frances M. Luce, his wife. Dr. Ives practiced as a specialist in Chicago, in which city his son and two of his three daughters resided. Mrs. Ives died in 1885. She was descended from a Revolutionary soldier of Connecticut who, when word came to him that there was fighting at Lexington, shouldered his gun and followed Israel Putnam to Massachusetts. Family tradition also claims for her a collateral descent from Ethan Allen, of Ticonderoga. In the 1830s, her paternal grandparents moved with their large family from Chautauqua County, New York, to a little settlement in Illinois known as Franklin Grove. At about the same time, her maternal grandmother, twice widowed, journeyed with her twelve children from Lewis County, New York, for the same destination. These families shared many sentiments in common, being strict Baptists, staunch abolitionists, and strong prohibitionists, and there was much intermarrying between them.

In 1871, she graduated from Mount Carroll Seminary and of the Frances Shimer School, and moved to Lynn, Massachusetts. (Note: According to Willard & Livermore (1893), in 1871, Breed removed to Boston, Massachusetts.)

== Career ==
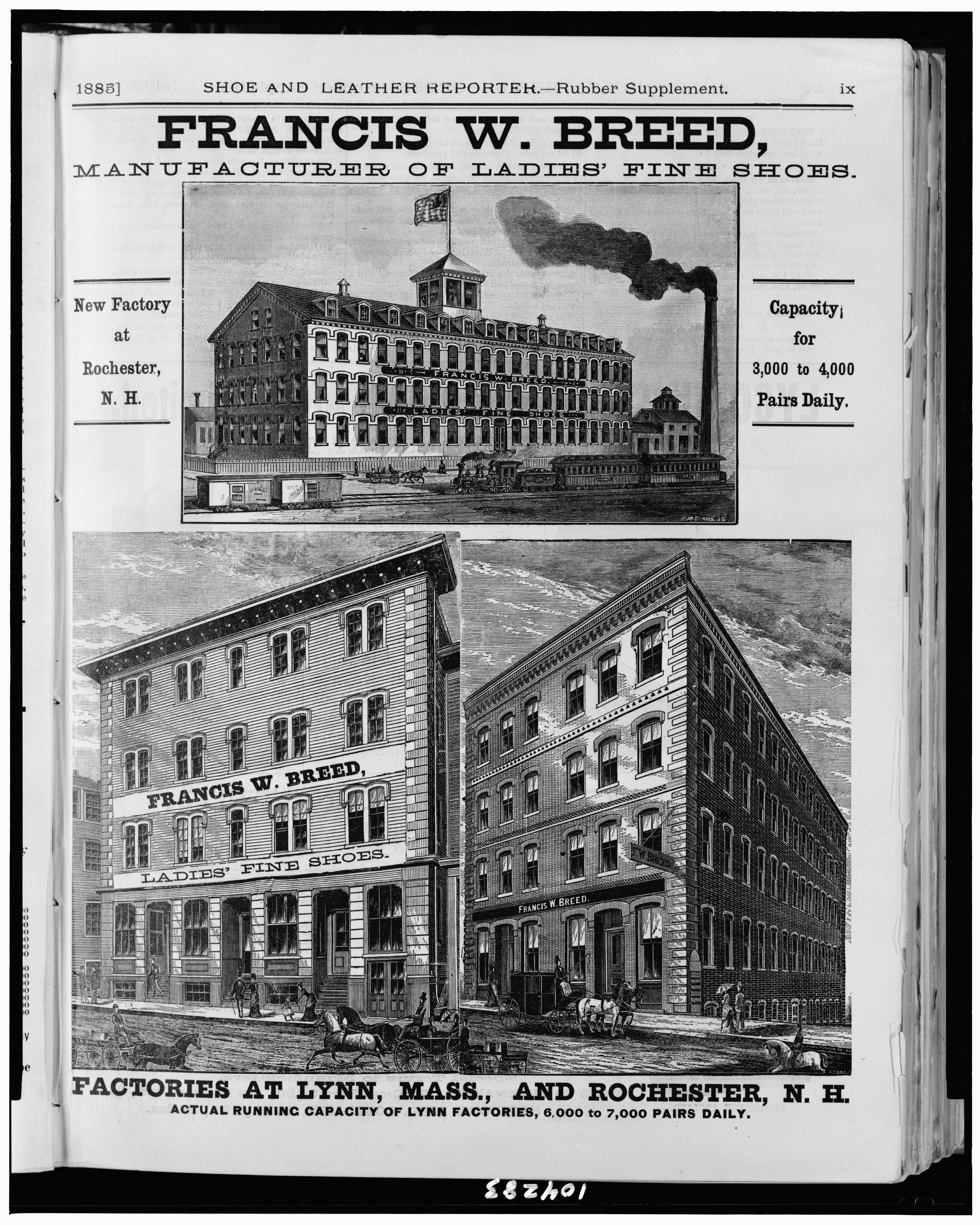
Breed shoe factory.

In 1873, she married Francis William Breed, a prominent shoe manufacturer, who was connected with business interests in Boston and Lynn. The couple were equally interested in music, art, and literature. They were noted for their hospitality, and were supporters of philanthropic work. They traveled extensively. Breed visited every part of the United States, including Alaska. She visited Canada, every country in Europe but Portugal, journeyed in Egypt, and left China in 1898 in order to attend meetings in Denver. She was well-read, and exhibited a sympathy with every movement of her time in the world of music, art and literature. Her home was a center for people distinguished in all those fields. She was an accomplished musician.

== Affiliations ==
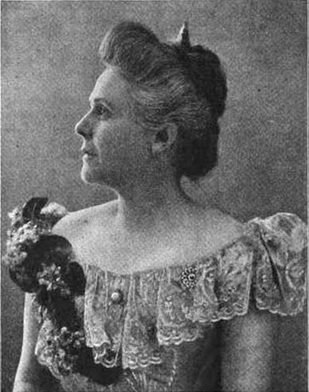
Alice Ives Breed

For years, Breed served as chair of the Lynn branch of the Emergency Association. She was the first president of the Woman's Auxiliary of the YMCA at Lynn, an early vice-president of the Lynn Woman's Club, and the first officer to preside over the North Shore Club. She was a member of the Massachusetts State committee for correspondence of the General Federation of Women's Literary Clubs. She was appointed a member of the Women's Committee of the World's Congress Auxiliary on moral and social reform, in 1893. She also served as chairperson of the Massachusetts State Committee of Correspondence, and was a member of it from the time of its formation. In 1896, she was elected vice-president of the General Federation of Women's Clubs. She was an officer of the Woman's Club House Association, where she represented the Browning Club, of Boston, and she served as president in the Massachusetts Society of the Sons and Daughters of Illinois. Breed was a member of the Daughters of the American Revolution.

== Personal life ==
The Breed's family consisted of five children, including daughter Florence Breed Khan. Their home was in Lynn.

In religion, Breed was of the Baháʼí Faith. In 1918, she served as chair of the Second Session Bahai Congress. She was a resident of New York City at the time.

Breed died October 16, 1933, in Manhattan, and was buried at Pine Grove Cemetery, Lynn, Massachusetts.
