= Shahram Shiva =

American writer

Shahram Shiva (AKA Valentino St. Germain)
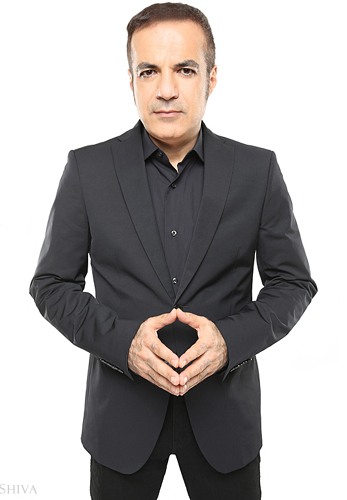
- Born: Mashhad, Khorasan Province, Iran
- Occupations: Performance poet, author, translator, teacher, lecturer, and recording artist
- Years active: 1990s–present
- Website: www.shahramshiva.com

Shahram Shiva, (shah ram shiva, transl. king rama shiva) (AKA Valentino St. Germain), born in Mashhad, Khorasan Province, Iran is an author, writer, poet, recording artist and translator of the works of Rumi, a 13th-century Persian poet and philosopher. Shiva is also the founder of Rumi Network.

Shahram Shiva taught Robert Downey Jr. the whirling movement in the movie Game 6 directed by Michael Hoffman.

Shahram Shiva began translating Rumi's poetry in 1988 and presented his first public performance four years later. From April 25 to May 5, 1998, Shiva's opera Until the Next Whirl was presented at La Mama in New York, with Shiva in the lead role.

== Performances ==
Since 1992, Shahram Shiva has been presenting concerts and readings at numerous venues, including the United Nations, the Smithsonian Institution, Museum of Contemporary Art San Diego, Cathedral of St. John the Divine, Joyce Theater, Kripalu Center, Omega Institute for Holistic Studies, New York Open Center, Yale University, Columbia University, and New York University, among many others.

From April 25 to May 5, 1998, Shiva performed in his own opera, Until the Next Whirl, at La MaMa Experimental Theatre Club on the Lower East Side of Manhattan.

== Bibliography ==
- Lord Vaal Prophecies: The Galactic Gods of the Continuum, Beings of Light, Masters of Time. A Novel. (2026)
- The Forbidden Bride of Jesus: The Secret Teachings of Jesus and Mary Magdalene Decoded. (2026)
- Rumi Unchained - The Forbidden Biography: Essential Chapters of Rumi’s Untold Story from 35 Years of Research. (2026)
- The Essential Rumi Transmission: Rumi's Hidden Path to Absolute Self-Mastery, Enlightenment and Ascension. (2026)
- The Ascension Prophecies: The Secret Guide to Unlocking Your Superpowers and Mastering Your Soul's Mission on the Path to Ascension. (2024)
- The Prophet Is You: The Secret Guide to Unlocking Your Own Powers and Discovering Your Soul’s Mission on the Path to Ascension. (2024)
- The Essential Rumi Quotes: Top 300 Most Inspiring. Rumi Network (2023)
- Rumi: The Beloved is You: My Favorite Collection of Deeply Passionate, Whimsical, Spiritual and Profound Poems and Quotes. (2022)
- 12 Secret Laws of Self-Realization: A Guide to Enlightenment and Ascension by a Modern Mystic. (2020)
- Rumi's Untold Story: From 30-Year Research. (2018)
- Transformative Whirling: Shahram Shiva's Unique & Proven 4-Step Method to Whirling. (2018)
- Rumi, Thief of Sleep: Quatrains from the Persian. Foreword by Deepak Chopra. Hohm Press. (2000)
- Hush, Don't Say Anything to God: Passionate Poems of Rumi. Jain Publishing. (1999)
- Rending the Veil: Literal and Poetic Translations of Rumi. Hohm Press. (Recipient of a Benjamin Franklin Award) (1995)
- A Garden Beyond Paradise: The Mystical Poetry of Rumi. Bantam Books (Random House) (1992).

== Discography ==
- Rumi: Love Evolve, 10 Favorite Rumi Songs. A mix of Rumi poetry set to music, and original songs with lyrics by Shahram Shiva. Produced by the GRAMMY Award-winner Danny Blume and Shahram Shiva. (2023)
- Love Evolve, a collection of 10 songs. A mix of Rumi poetry set to music, and original songs with lyrics by Shahram Shiva. Produced by the GRAMMY Award-winner Danny Blume and Shahram Shiva. (2012)
- Rumi: Lovedrunk (Remastered), 2012 Release. A remastered release with enhanced sound and new cover design. A collection of 10 songs with lyrics based on Rumi poems, as translated and interpreted by Shahram Shiva. Produced by Olivier Glissant and Shahram Shiva. (2012)
- Rumi: Lovedrunk, a collection of 10 songs with lyrics based on Rumi poems, as translated and interpreted by Shahram Shiva. Produced by Olivier Glissant and Shahram Shiva. (2005)
