= Mirza Ali-Qoli Khan Zarabi =

Iranian diplomat and Baháʼí translator

Mirza Ali-Qoli Khan
- علی‌قلی
- Photograph by Georges Chevalier, 1919

Iranian ambassador to United States

Chargés d'affaires ad interim
- In office 25 April 1918 – 18 June 1919
- Monarch: Ahmad Shah Qajar
- Preceded by: Mehdi Khan Mansur od-Dowleh
- Succeeded by: Mirza Abdolali Khan
- In office 31 August 1910 – 17 March 1914
- Monarch: Ahmad Shah Qajar
- Preceded by: Morteza Khan
- Succeeded by: Mehdi Khan Mansur od-Dowleh

Personal details
- Born: c. 1879 Kashan, Iran
- Died: April 7, 1966 Washington, D.C., United States
- Spouse: Florence Breed Khan
- Children: 3, including Marzieh Gail
- Other names: Mirza Ali Kuli Khan; Ali Gholi Khan

Mirza Ali-Qoli Khan (Persian: میرزا علی‌قلی‌ خان) also known as Ali-Qoli Khan Nabil od-Dowleh (Persian: علی‌قلی ‌خان نبیل‌الدوله; c. 1879 – April 7, 1966) was an Iranian diplomat who served as ambassador to united states twice, from 1910 to 1914 and from 1918 to 1919 also he was a translator of Baháʼí scriptures.

== Background ==
Ali-Qoli Khan's father, Mirza Abdolrahim Khan, was a member of notable Zarabi family of Kashan, had become a Bábi in 1866 and later a Baháʼí. Mirza Abdolrahim Khan moved to Tehran in 1880, where he became counselor (Mostashar) in the new-style police department (Nazmiyeh), hence his title Kalantar.

== Early life and education ==
=== Education and Early Baháʼí Involvement ===
Ali-Qoli Khan studied English and French at Dar al-Fonun. Together with his older brother, Hosaynqoli Khan Kalantar, who later served as Chamberlain to Mozaffar ad-Din Shah Qajar (r. 1896–1907) during his tenure as Prince-governor of Tabriz, he frequented zurkhanehs (traditional Persian gymnasiums). It was at one of these zurkhanehs that Hosaynqoli Khan was converted to Bahai faith by a wrestler named Ostad Gholam-Hossein Kashi. He, in turn, introduced Ali-Qoli Khan to new movement around 1895. After a period spent traveling as a wandering Bahai Dervish, Ali-Qoli Khan learned that ʻAbdu'l-Bahá required translators to assist with new American co-religionists. Consequently, he departed for Akka in 1899 to serve as ʻAbdu'l-Bahá's secretary. In 1901, Ali-Qoli Khan accompanied Mírzá Abu'l-Faḍl to Paris and United States, serving as his official translator.

== Diplomatic career in the United States ==
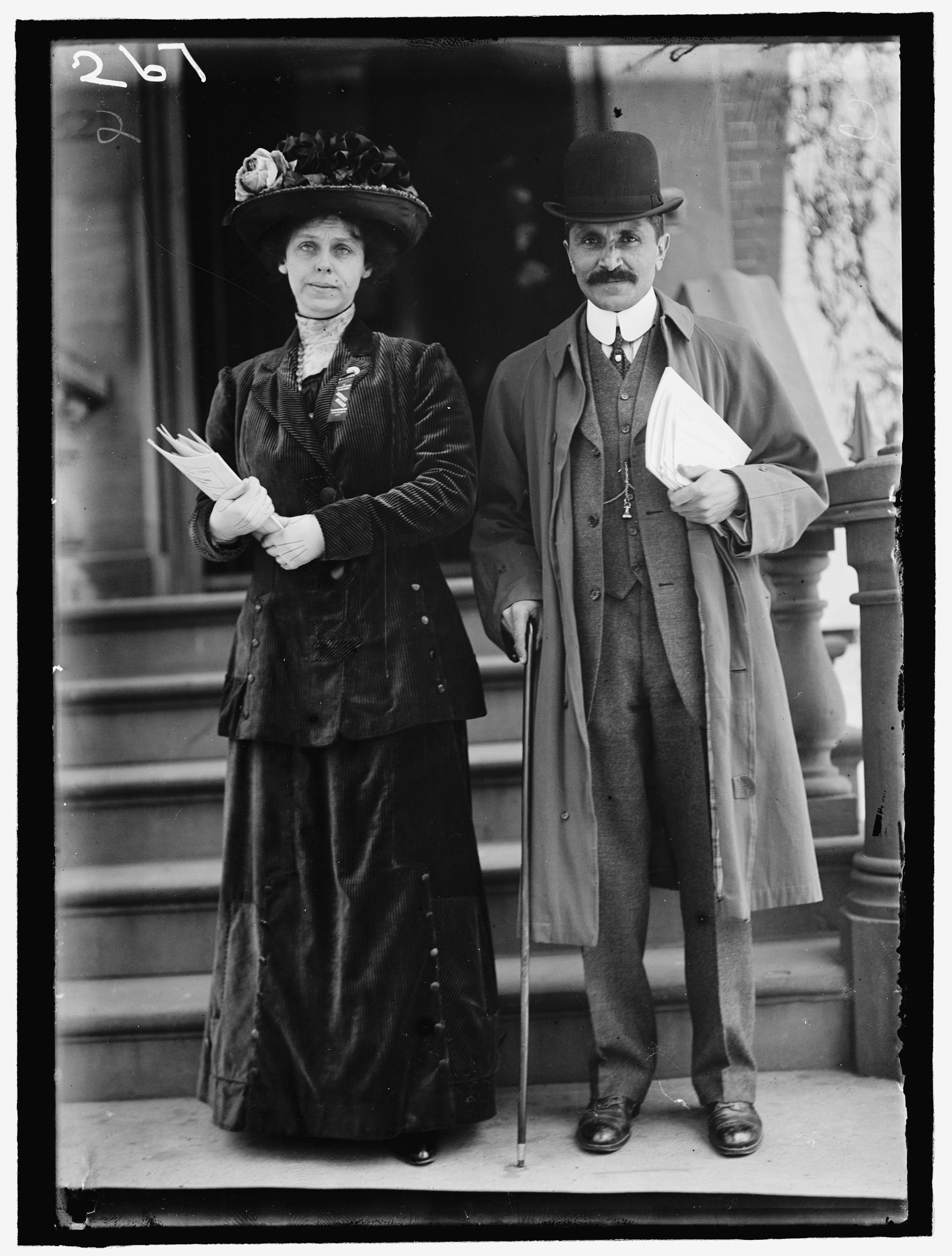
Florence Breed Khan and Ali-Qoli Khan in 1911

Ali-Qoli Khan settled in America, where he was known as Ali Kuli Khan and became secretary to Persian ambassador in Washington, D.C. on 1902. In 1904, he married Florence Breed, a Bahai lady from Boston. Ali-Qoli returned to Tehran in 1906/1907 with his family, visiting the Bahai leader ʻAbdu'l-Bahá on the way. On his return to Washington, he was appointed Iranian consul in Washington from 1907. He firmly believed that Persia should look to the United States—a nation with no colonial ambitions in the region—rather than European powers to drive its modernization. In his efforts to foster bilateral economic ties, Ali-Qoli Khan cultivated connections with prominent American politicians, industrialists, and financiers, including Henry Ford and President Woodrow Wilson. During a visit to Persia in 1910, he argued against hiring a German financial advisor, advocating instead for appointment of an American expert to reform the nation's finances. Upon returning to Washington as charge d'affaires with the title Nabil od-Dowleh, Ali-Qoli Khan advocated the appointment of an American financial advisor to reform Persia's finances. William Morgan Shuster was later appointed for this position. Ali-Qoli Khan was also in Washington when ʻAbdu’l-Bahá visited the city in 1912. At the Panama–Pacific International Exposition, a world's fair held in San Francisco in 1915, Ali-Qoli Khan was responsible for the Persian exhibit, which consisted largely of his personal collection of Persian art. Following the exposition, he was invited to lecture throughout the United States on Persian art.

After World War I, Ali-Qoli Khan was appointed a minister in persian delegation to Paris Peace Conference (1919–1920). In March 1919, he hosted a dinner for senior members of the American and Persian delegations at the Ritz Hotel. Early in 1921, he was appointed ambassador at the Ottoman government in Istanbul, replacing Khan-Malek Sasani. Ali-Qoli Khan did not remain in Istanbul for long. Later year, Mohammad Hassan Mirza, the Crown prince, passed through Istanbul and was impressed by Ali-Qoli Khan's managerial abilities. He subsequently asked him to return to Persia and serve as his minister of the royal court, although Ali-Qoli Khan does not appear to have ever held the position. Frustrated in his attempts to bring about reforms and increasingly attacked by the clerics for being a Baháʼí, Ali-Qoli Khan took up the offer of becoming Persian minister to the five republics of the Caucasus at Tbilisi, where he observed the early stages of Communism during 1923-1942.

In 1924, after staying with the new Baháʼí leader Shoghi Effendi in Haifa, the family traveled to the United States and settled in New York. There, Ali-Qoli Khan, no longer in Persian government service and with limited financial resources, supported himself by lecturing and operating a gallery of Persian art in Rockefeller Center. He increasingly devoted himself to serving the Baháʼí community, frequently lecturing on Baháʼí subjects throughout the United States. In 1925–1926, he served as a member of the National Spiritual Assembly of the Baháʼís of the USA.

== Later life and death ==
His most important service to Baháʼí community, however, was his translation of Baháʼí scriptures, as there were few reliable translations available to the American Baháʼí community at the time. He sometimes wrote under the pen name "Ishtael-ebn-Kalenter". Florence died in 1949, while Ali-Qoli Khan was in Iran on business. After this, he moved to Washington, D.C., where he remained until his own death on 7 April 1966.

=== Family ===
Ali-Qoli Khan and Florence Breed had three children, Rahim (born 1905), Marzieh (1908–1993), and Hamideh (1910–1989). Their daughter Marzieh Gail published a series of family memoirs, Other People, Other Places (1982), Summon up Remembrance (1987), and Arches of the Years (1991).

== Sources ==
- Etemad, Guity (2000). "NABIL-AL-DAWLA". In Yarshater, Ehsan (ed.). Encyclopædia Iranica (Online ed.). Encyclopædia Iranica Foundation.
- Fazel Mazandarani, Asad-Allah (1974). تاریخ ظهور الحق [History of the Manifestation of Truth] (in Persian). Vol. 8, pt. 1. Tehran: Bahá'í Publishing Trust.
- Shuster, William Morgan (1912). The Strangling of Persia. New York: The Century Co.
- McDaniel, Robert A. (1974). The Shuster Mission and the Persian Constitutional Revolution. Minneapolis: Bibliotheca Islamica.
- "PERSIA WANTS OUR HELP.; Foreign Minister Tells Needs at Dinner in Paris". The New York Times. 8 March 1919.
- Sasani, Ahmad Khan-Malek (1966). یادبودهای سفارت استانبول [Reminiscences of the Embassy in Istanbul] (in Persian). Tehran: Ferdowsi.
- Chen, Constance M. (1996). "Obituary: Marzieh Nabil Carpenter Gail (1908–1993): Translator and Author, "Patron Saint" of Women Bahá'í Scholars". Baháʼí Studies Review.
