= Florence Breed Khan =

American Bahá'í

- Portrait by Chevalier Georges, 1919
- Born: Florence M. Breed; 1875; Lynn, Massachusetts, US
- Died: June 24, 1950 (aged 74–75); Teaneck, New Jersey, US
- Spouse: Mirza Ali Kuli Khan
- Children: 3, including Marzieh Gail
- Mother: Alice Ives Breed

Florence Breed Khan (1875 – June 24, 1950) was an American political hostess and Bahá'í convert from Boston, wife of Mirza Ali Kuli Khan, a Persian translator and diplomat.

== Early life ==
Florence M. Breed was born in Lynn, Massachusetts, the daughter of Francis W. Breed and Alice Ives Breed. Her father was a shoe manufacturer. Her mother, an active clubwoman, was also a Bahá'í convert, introduced to the faith by suffragist Mary Hanford Ford.

== Career ==
Breed, who acted as a young woman and studied Eastern religions and texts, married a Persian diplomat, Mirza Ali Kuli Khan, in 1904. They met when he was lecturing at Harvard University. Following his diplomatic career, they lived in Washington, D.C., San Francisco, Paris, Tehran, Istanbul, and Tbilisi.

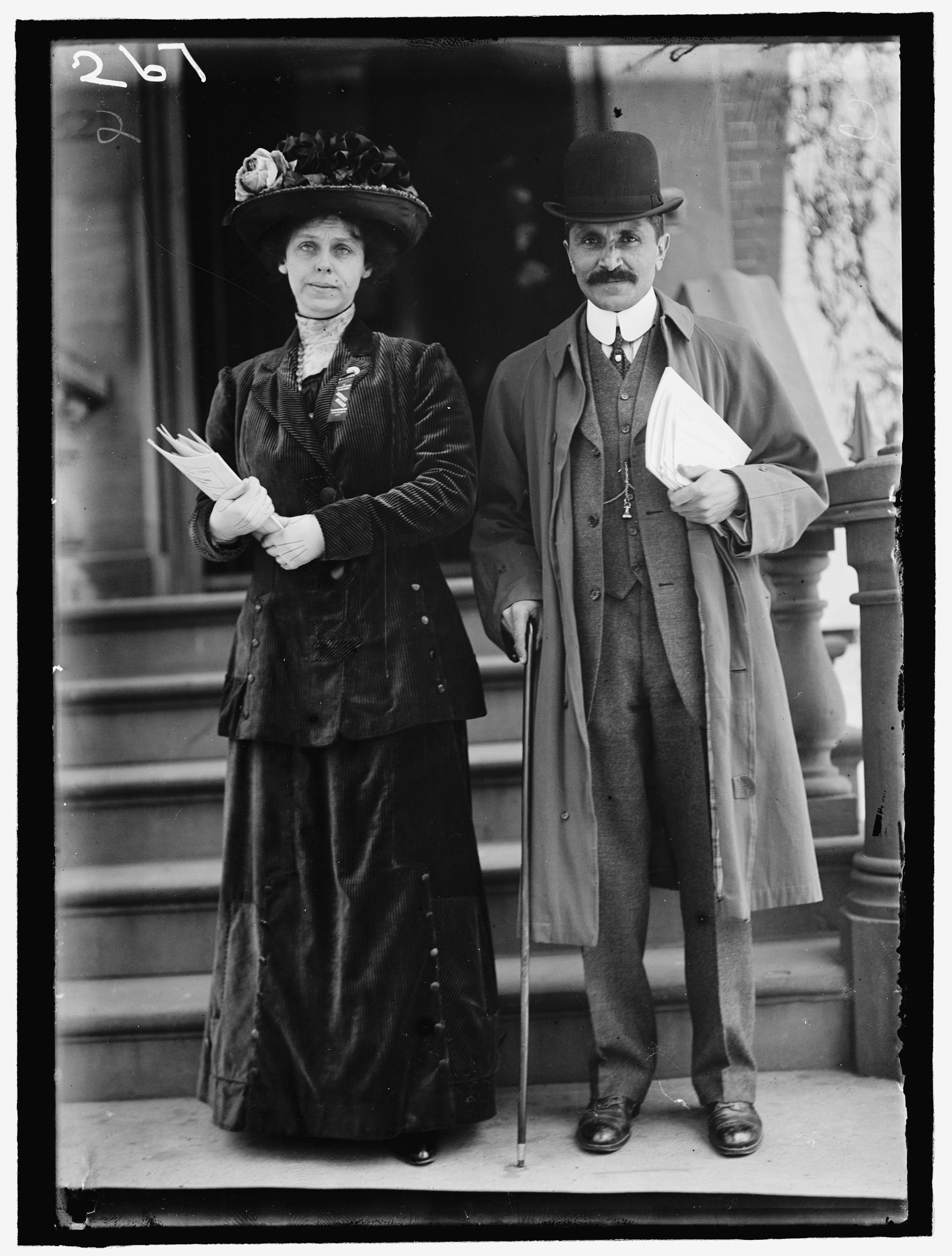
Florence Breed Khan and Mirza Ali Kuli Khan in 1911. Library of Congress

Khan was a society hostess in Washington while her husband was the Persian chargé d'affaires there. "I find that few Americans, even traveled and cultured ones, know Persian as it deserves to be appreciated," she told an interviewer in 1910. The Khan family greeted Bahá'i leader ‘Abdu’l-Bahá on his arrival in Washington in 1912, and hosted a luncheon for him, with guests including Louis Gregory. She contributed Persian recipes to The Economy Administration Cookbook (1913). In 1915, she and her husband attended the Panama-Pacific International Exposition in San Francisco, representing Persia. She was an occasional lecturer on Persia to community groups.

== Personal life ==
Florence Breed and Ali Kuli Khan had three children, Rahim (born 1905), Marzieh (1908–1993), and Hamideh (1910–1989). Florence Breed Khan died in 1950, in Teaneck, New Jersey, in her seventies. Their daughter Marzieh Gail published a series of family memoirs, Other People, Other Places (1982), Summon up Remembrance (1987), and Arches of the Years (1991).
