= Iranian Psychological Association of America =

Iranian Psychological Association of America (IPAA) is a non-profit organization that promotes research and training on psychological issues in the Iranian and American communities.

== History ==
IPAA was established on June 10, 2005, as a non-profit organization composed of Master's and Doctoral level clinicians and students in the mental health field. Its goal is to raise awareness of mental health issues affecting the Iranian community.

IPAA has received continuing education sponsorship approval from the American Psychological Association. IPAA is also approved by the California Board of Behavioral Sciences to provide continuing education classes to Marriage and Family Therapists and LCSWs. Monthly meetings are held in which licensed psychologists present continuing education classes to IPAA's members.

== Collaborations ==
IPAA works in collaboration with the Los Angeles County Psychological Association to enhance awareness and treatment of different mental health issues through a multicultural lens.

== See also ==
- American Psychological Association
