= Baháʼí Faith in Barbados =

The Baháʼí Faith in Barbados begins with a mention by ʻAbdu'l-Bahá, then head of the religion, in 1916 as the Caribbean was among the places Baháʼís should take the religion to. The first Baháʼí to visit came in 1927 while pioneers arrived by 1964 and the first Baháʼí Local Spiritual Assembly was elected in 1965. Hand of the Cause ʻAlí-Muhammad Varqá attended the inaugural election of the Barbados Baháʼís National Spiritual Assembly in 1981.

== Size and demographics ==
The government census of 2010 reported 178 Baháʼís on the island, and Baháʼís report about 400 members.

The UN Statistics Division estimated 98 Baháʼís in 2016, and in 2010 the Association of Religion Data Archives (relying on World Christian Encyclopedia) estimated some 1.2% of Barbadians - some 3,300 - was Baháʼís.

== Pre-history ==
Hubert Parris may well be the first Barbadian to encounter the Baháʼí Faith. He was a Barbadian Christian minister working in the area of trade relations with the United Kingdom up to around 1899, working with Victor Branford and traveling to Ireland. In 1899 he also attended Teachers College, Columbia University, in New York. In the Summers of 1902, 1903 and 1904, Parris gave talks at Greenacre for the Monsalvat School for the Comparative Study of Religion. The talks he offered over the years were: "The West Indian Woman", "How I made bricks without straw", "The Rochdale Co-operative Movement in England", and "Horace Plunkett and the economic and industrial redemption of Ireland". At the time Greenacre hosted talks also by Mírzá Abu'l-Faḍl, a scholar of the Baháʼí Faith of the time, and Sarah Farmer, founder of Greenacre, had converted to the religion in 1900. He would recollect his time there fondly more than 50 years later. In 1905 he graduated from Howard University, and was ordained as an Episcopal priest serving in various churches in the south-east of the United States across the next decade, and began to work in the medical field, then earned a doctor degree from Shaw University in North Carolina, and was licensed. From the Fall of 1915 he was visible practicing medicine in Wilmington, and continued his ministerial work, until 1920 when he resigned from the church, while continuing his medical practice. By 1924 he was no longer living in Wilmington, and was soon known as a small country doctor in Rich Square where he became known as a Baháʼí.

ʻAbdu'l-Bahá, the son of the founder of the religion, wrote a series of letters, or tablets, to the followers of the religion in the United States in 1916-1917; these letters were compiled together in the book titled Tablets of the Divine Plan. The sixth of the tablets was the first to mention Latin American regions and was written on April 8, 1916, but was delayed in being presented in the United States until 1919—after the end of the First World War and the Spanish flu. The first actions on the part of Baháʼí community towards Latin America were that of a few individuals who made trips to Mexico and South America near or before this unveiling in 1919, including Mr. and Mrs. Frankland, and Roy C. Wilhelm, and Martha Root. The sixth tablet was translated and presented by Mirza Ahmad Sohrab on April 4, 1919, and published in Star of the West magazine on December 12, 1919.

His Holiness Christ says: Travel ye to the East and to the West of the world and summon the people to the Kingdom of God....(travel to) the Islands of the West Indies, such as Cuba, Haiti, Puerto Rico, Jamaica, the Islands of the Lesser Antilles (which includes Barbados), Bahama Islands, even the small Watling Island, have great importance…

In 1927 Leonora Armstrong was the first Baháʼí to visit and give lectures about the Baháʼí Faith in many Latin American countries including Barbados as part of her plan to complement and complete Martha Root's unfulfilled intention of visiting all the Latin American countries for the purpose of presenting the religion to an audience.

=== Seven Year Plan and succeeding decades ===
Shoghi Effendi wrote a cable on May 1, 1936 to the Baháʼí Annual Convention of the United States and Canada, and asked for the systematic implementation of ʻAbdu'l-Bahá's vision to begin. In his cable he wrote:

Appeal to assembled delegates ponder historic appeal voiced by ʻAbdu'l-Bahá in Tablets of the Divine Plan. Urge earnest deliberation with incoming National Assembly to insure its complete fulfillment. First century of Baháʼí Era drawing to a close. Humanity entering outer fringes most perilous stage its existence. Opportunities of present hour unimaginably precious. Would to God every State within American Republic and every Republic in American continent might ere termination of this glorious century embrace the light of the Faith of Baháʼu'lláh and establish structural basis of His World Order.

Following the May 1 cable, another cable from Shoghi Effendi came on May 19 calling for permanent pioneers to be established in all the countries of Latin America. The Baháʼí National Spiritual Assembly of the United States and Canada appointed the Inter-America Committee to take charge of the preparations. During the 1937 Baháʼí North American Convention, Shoghi Effendi cabled advising the convention to prolong their deliberations to permit the delegates and the National Assembly to consult on a plan that would enable Baháʼís to go to Latin America as well as to include the completion of the outer structure of the Baháʼí House of Worship in Wilmette, Illinois. In 1937 the First Seven Year Plan (1937–44), which was an international plan designed by Shoghi Effendi, gave the American Baháʼís the goal of establishing the Baháʼí Faith in every country in Latin America. With the spread of American Baháʼís in Latin American, Baháʼí communities and Local Spiritual Assemblies began to form in 1938 across the rest of Latin America.

The first Baha'i enrolled in the Bahamas, Charles Winfield Small, was also the next to visit Barbados when he did so in 1958. By the fall of 1964 Mr. D. R. Holder and Etta Woodlen were pioneers and there may have been 2 native Barbadians. By April 1965 two assemblies - a minimum of 18 people including Woodlen - were formed. However Woodlen died in June when on a return trip to the States though her will provided for a center.

== Inter/National development ==
As far back as 1951 the Baháʼís had organized a regional National Assembly for the combination of Mexico, Central America and the Antilles islands. From 1966 the region was reorganized among the Baháʼís of Leeward, Windward and Virgin Islands with its seat in Charlotte Amalie During October 1966 a trip to ten islands was planned by Lorraine Landau, a pioneer in Barbados. Among the more notable visitors was Hand of the Cause Ruhiyyih Khanum when she toured Caribbean Islands for five weeks in 1970. The five days of Ruhiyyih Khanum's stay there was packed with activities. She met with the Governor General Sir Winston Scott who also happened to be a medical man and discussed the Faith and allied topics for over half an hour in a most cordial interview. The press and radio coverage was excellent. Prominent women listened to an informal talk given at a reception in her honor. A one-day deepening and teaching school was held at which all the Baha'is as well as their interested friends were present and Ruhiyyih Khanum also addressed a public meeting and was interviewed on a weekly program on the radio program.

From 1972 the regional assembly was reorganized for Barbados, St. Lucia, Barbados, St. Vincent, Grenada and other Windward Islands. Hand of the Cause ʻAlí-Muhammad Varqá attended the inaugural election of the Barbados Baháʼí National Spiritual Assembly in 1981.

== Modern community ==
Since its inception the religion has had involvement in socio-economic development The religion entered a new phase of activity when a message of the Universal House of Justice dated 20 October 1983 was released. Baháʼís were urged to seek out ways, compatible with the Baháʼí teachings, in which they could become involved in the social and economic development of the communities in which they lived. Worldwide in 1979 there were 129 officially recognized Baháʼí socio-economic development projects. By 1987, the number of officially recognized development projects had increased to 1482.

== See also ==
- Culture of Barbados
- History of Barbados
