= Green Acre Baháʼí School =

Conference facility in Eliot, Maine, United States

Coordinates: 43°06′41.27″N 70°47′40.04″W

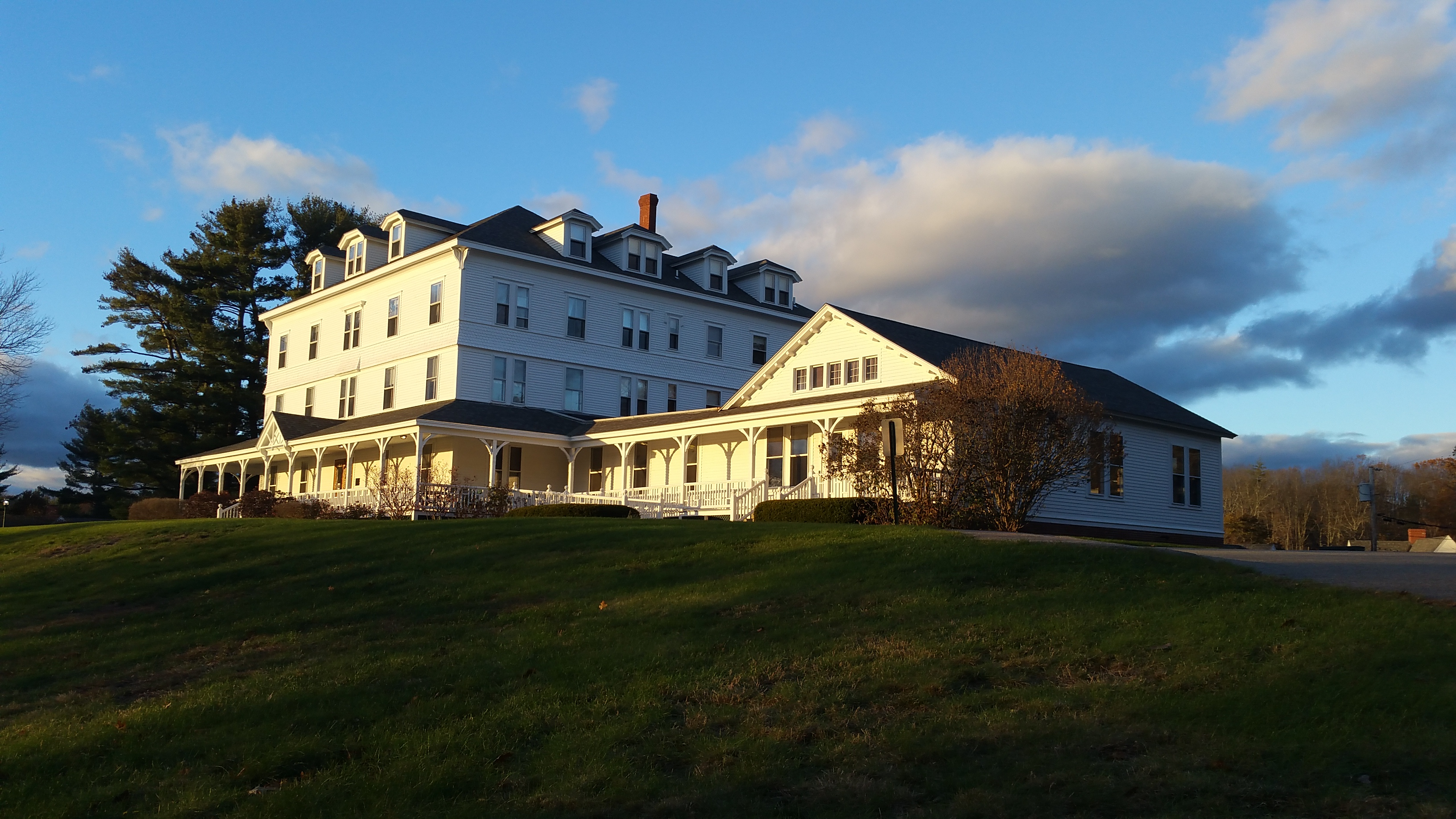
The Inn at Green Acre, in Eliot, Maine

Green Acre Baháʼí School is a conference facility in Eliot, Maine, in the United States, and is one of three leading institutions owned by the National Spiritual Assembly of the Baháʼís of the United States. The name of the site has had various versions of "Green Acre" since before its founding in 1894 by Sarah Jane Farmer.

It had a prolonged process of progress and challenge while run by Farmer until about 1913 when she was indisposed after converting to the Baháʼí Faith in 1900. ʻAbdu'l-Bahá, then head of the religion, visited there during his travels in the West in 1912. Farmer died in 1916 and thereafter it had evolved into the quintessential Baháʼí school directly inspiring Louhelen Baháʼí School and Bosch Baháʼí School, the other two of the three schools owned by the national assembly, and today serves as a leading institution of the religion in America. It hosted diverse programs of study, presenters, and been a focus for dealing with racism in the United States through being a significant venue for Race Amity Conventions (later renamed Race Unity Day meetings) and less than a century later the Black Men's Gatherings and further events.

== Origin ==
The Piscataqua River by which Green Acre Baháʼí school stands was named from Abenaki Native Americans of the Wabanaki Confederacy describing where a river separates into several parts – "a place where boats and canoes ascending the river together from its mouth were compelled to separate according to their several destinations." The town of Eliot was founded 1810 from Kittery, Maine, which itself was founded in the 1600s. By the mid-1800s the area served as a shipyard, including launching the USS Nightingale in 1851. At the time of the founding of the school there were some 1,400 people in Eliot and the town has grown in recent years to near 7,000 today.

=== The Farmers ===
Sarah Farmer's mother, Hannah Tobey Farmer (1823–1891) was raised Methodist. Her father, Moses Gerrish Farmer (1820–1893) a Dartmouth graduate in 1844, had success in the new field of electrical engineering and telegraph work and was a heartfelt Christian, though he has also been called a Spiritualist and Transcendentalist. Moses and Hannah married in 1844 and Sarah was born 1847. It is said that the Farmer's home, before they lived in Eliot, was part of the Underground Railroad.

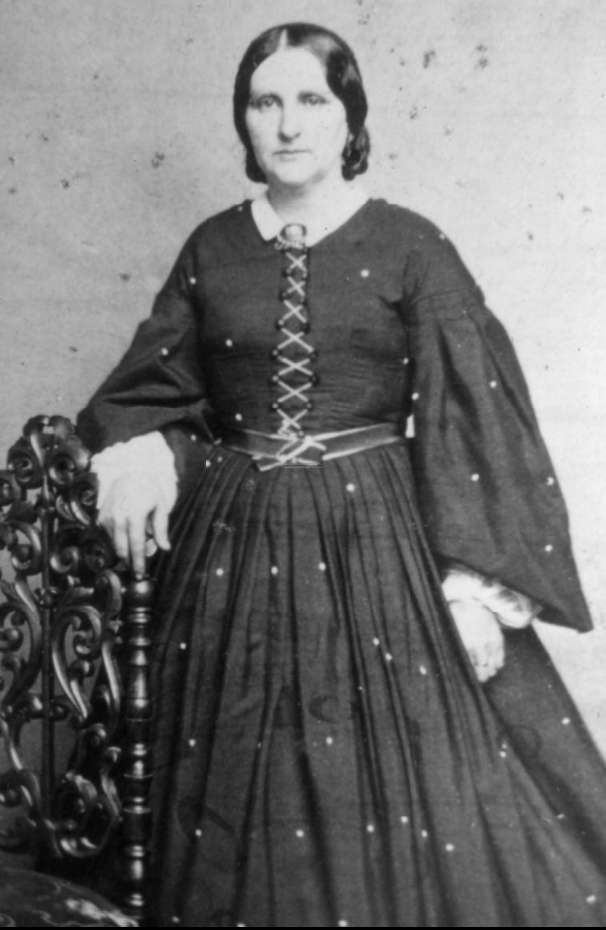
Hannah Tobey Farmer

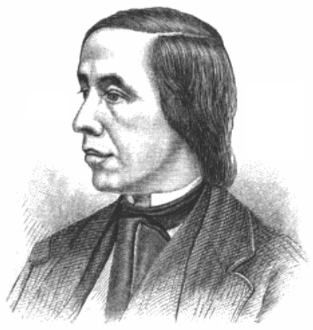
Moses G. Farmer

It is unclear when the land in Eliot came to be owned by the Farmer family. However, they lived in a variety of places in New England until, after 1880, when the family moved to Eliot and Moses retired. The home they built in Eliot was called Bittersweat, or Bittersweet-in-the-Fields. Hannah established a memorial non-segregated service called "Rosemary Cottage" as a retreat for unwed or poor mothers and working women in Eliot where, for a donation of $7 ($181 in 2014,) families would have a two-week vacation, up to 40 at a time in 1888. In 1887, Sarah re-animated the Eliot Library Association and set a number of meetings with speakers while also serving as secretary and helping build a list of patrons of the library of some 700 people. Singer Emma Cecilia Thursby recalled her first visit to what was called "Greenacre" was in 1889. Greenacre is and was situated on a bluff overlooking the river which is a mile wide. In 1890, a group of investors signed a contract to set up a hotel initially called the Eliot Hotel or Inn at the site. In 1891 there were paying customers staying at the Inn.

Farmer had an originating idea about a spiritual theme for the development of the property in June 1892 and then journeyed with her father to the Chicago Columbian Exposition in late 1892 where she met with Swedenborgian Charles C. Bonney, the "visionary" behind the World's Parliament of Religions, and gained encouragement for her vision for a center of learning for spiritual teachers - an idea blessed by family friends Arthur Wesley Dow and John Greenleaf Whittier. Her father died that spring, 1893, and she had to leave before the Parliament took place. She took a brief trip to Norway with Sara Chapman Bull in her grief, and she made it back to the Parliament only in October 1893 after it was over.

Farmer made what she recorded in her diary as a "solemn vow" to building the school for spiritual teachers on 4 February 1894. However, by about 1894 the hotel was called a failure and was boarded up when Farmer approached the investors with the plan to use Greenacre as a place to host lectures on religion. Farmer proposed to her investors to use the closed Inn. By 1897, it was capable of housing 75 or more guests and had a number of cottages around the property with a grassy plain that sometimes hosted a tent camp.

=== Sarah Farmer's inauguration of Greenacre ===
Following the enthusiasm of the Parliament, Farmer set up the beginnings of using the Greenacre Inn as a summer center of cross-religion gatherings and cultural development. She had success attracting support from Bostonian businessmen, wives of businessmen and politicians, most especially Phoebe Hearst. The work was inaugurated in 1894 with her words "The spirit of criticism will be absolutely laid down – if it comes in it will be gently laid aside; each will contribute his best and listen sympathetically to those who present different ideals. The comparison will be made by the audience, not by the teachers." The early collection of religious interests was wide - Farmer participated with Spiritualist trance-speakers who appeared to channel her father so convincingly the family dog responded, a fact William James took note of.

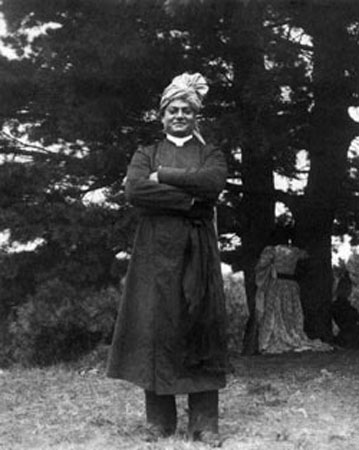
Vivekananda at Greenacre (August 1894)

One of the first such promulgators of spiritual insight there was Carl H. A. Bjerregaard where he would frequent through at least 1896. Swami Vivekananda, a prominent Hindu monk serving in interfaith awareness efforts spent nearly two months there in the summer of 1894. His words were printed in the short lived The Greenacre Voice established with the school-and-conference center running at least to 1897. A review appeared in the local Boston Evening Transcript.

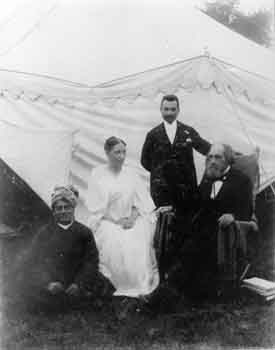
Swami Vivekananda and Sarah Farmer at Green Acre (August 1894)

A short list of presentations was published in the newspaper even as far away as Chicago also featured academic scholars as well as priests presenting on religions: Professor Ernest Fenollosa, Boston Museum of Fine Arts – "The Relation of Religion to Art"; Rev. Dr. Edward Everett Hale, "Sociology"; Rev. Dr. William Alger, "Universal Religion"; Edwin Meade, "Immanuel Kant"; Professor Thomas C. Wild, "Union for Practical Progress"; Frank B Sanborn, "The Humane treatment of Mental and Spiritual Aberrations"; Margaret B. Peeke from Sandusky, Ohio, "The Soul in its search after God"; and Abby Morton Diaz, "The Work of humanity for humanity" were among the "well known" presenters but the distinction of the summer school was of lecturers who were younger and less well known than those of the earlier Concord School of Philosophy maintained by the Transcendentalists previously which closed about 1887 and less about philosophy than of comparative study initially. The sessions were positively reviewed. Sanborn would soon be among the leaders operating at Greenacre. Professor Lewis G. Janes was there giving talks on "Darwin and Spencer", "Social Tendencies under Evolution" and "Life as a Fine Art" and would also soon take a leading role in developments as well. There was also something of a windstorm that year. The "school" had a winter session in Cambridge with several repeat appearances hosted by Sara Chapman Bull. Indeed, these winter sessions continued some years and came to be called the Cambridge Conferences directed by Janes.

=== 1895 to 1899 ===
An 1895 address book of Farmer's revealed she had contact information on a number of leaders of thought and religion in America. That summer among those that met at the conference center were evolutionists, and Farmer invited Lewis Janes to assist with the program development. Janes was a student of Herbert Spencer. An engine inventor also presented. The conference grew to the point the Inn itself was too small and a tent camp arose as well as buildings to provide shelter from rain or sun were added.

July 14, 1896, Farmer announced Booker T. Washington would appear during his fundraising tour for the Tuskeegee Institute the next day - and also on the program was a Zoroastrian presenter and others. Washington's speech was printed in the Boston Evening Transcript a few days later. Afterwards, Sanborn organized an "Emerson Day" (after Ralph Waldo Emerson) and it continued for more than a decade. That year a formal reunion of the Concord School of Philosophy was also held. In addition to the talks on art, actual musical concerts, painters, sculptors, poets began to make appearances at Greenacre. Strong calls for peace against war from the conference got printed in the Boston Evening Transcript.

The Monsalvat School for the Comparative Study of Religion, a progressive or liberal development seen against conservative religious experience, was established formally in 1896 as an institution hosted at Greenacre and the first director was Lewis Janes. Monsalvat was named after the sacred mountain in Wagner's Parsifal where the Holy Grail was kept, though it is most often spelled Montsalvat. However, Farmer and Janes differed often – Janes wanted academic credentials among his speakers and a businesslike plan for the economic solvency of the work by charging everyone rather than trusting on contributions. They had serious difficulty even agreeing on what they were talking about – "This difference of understanding could never have occurred between two men accustomed to business methods," Janes wrote in 1899. Farmer framed the school as a place for encounter between religious leaders for "a fuller realization" of unity among religions, and relied on generosity and enthusiasm to overcome the challenges of economy. Nevertheless, the school and Greenacre continue to operate and was noted in newspapers.

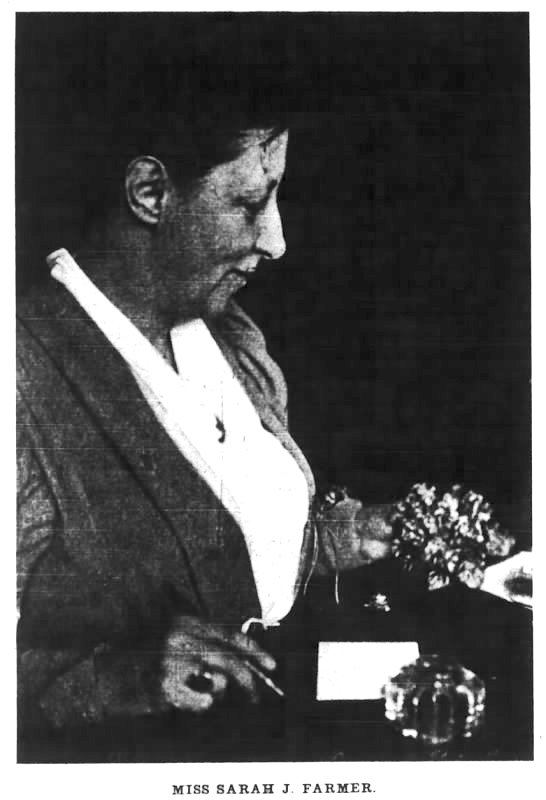
Sarah J. Farmer, published in the New York Times, Sept. 19, 1897

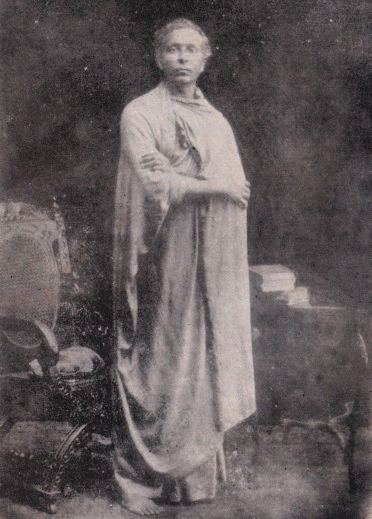
Srimath Anagarika Dharmapala in his middle thirties

The August 1897 season opened with the new lecture hall the "Eirenion", ("place of peace",) and Sarah Farmer and Greenacre made the New York Times. A book was circulated in Japan about it too. Prominent Buddhist monk Anagarika Dharmapala stayed at Greenacre where he worked on practices himself and offered classes and talks on specific meditational disciplines as well as quotes on the teachings of the Buddha. He was enthusiastic about the kind of interfaith coming together process of Greenacre. Unitarian Alfred W. Martin closed the 1897 season with a talk "Universal Religion and the World's Religions", the theme of which became his life's work. Electrical engineers met at the conference center at least in 1897 as the fiftieth anniversary of the invention of the electric tolley car.

The 1898 session on the Monsalvat school listed a variety of people including Janes himself on "Relation of Science to Religious Thought", Swami Abhedananda on "Vedanta philosophy and Religions of India", "Hebrew Prophets" by Prof. Nathaniel Schmidt, "Literature, Ethics and Philosophy of the Talmud" by Rabbi Joseph Krauskopf, "Islam and the Koran" by Emil Nabokoff, "Philosophy and Religions of the Jains" by Vichand Raghavji Gandhi and others.

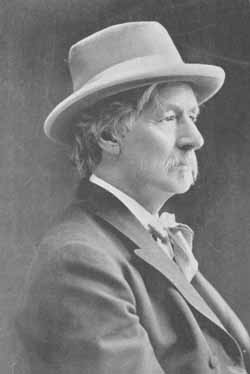
Franklin Benjamin Sanborn in 1900

A diary of Charles W. Chesnutt noted he was a replacement speaker for Walter Hines Page for a talk in 1899 on the condition of African-Americans in the South, and commented on witnessing a diversity of clothing representing cultures of the world. Farmer's farewell address for the 1899 season was printed in the Boston Evening Transcript and contained warm thoughts of the development of the work and its ongoing goals. A beatific booklet Greenacre on the Piscataqua of some 22 pages with a section written in August 1899 and another in September 1900 was published. Baháʼís have identified a quote from the religion in the 1899 program and speculate Farmer had heard of the religion. However, in Farmer's life and the structure of Greenacre there was crisis. According to scholar Eric Leigh Schmidt Sanborn was working for a "creation of a new shrine" for transcendentalism akin to reforming the Concord school centered on Emerson and used his coverage work of Greenacre in newspaper stories to frame that development while at the same time Janes drifted explicitly from Farmer's approach by charging people for the classes and insisting on academic credentials and approaches to understand the diversity of religions. Janes' disconnect from Farmer had reached the point of shutting down the Monsalvat school. There were also tensions between Sanborn and Janes and among other groups. There had been speculation on Farmer being bought out, creditors were nervous, and her business partners had thought to force Farmer to sell out.

== Transformation ==
=== 1900–1906 ===
==== Farmer's encounter with the Baháʼí Faith ====
While her partners were seeking to meet with her, Farmer was already aboard the SS Fürst Bismarck out of New York as a guest of Maria P. Wilson trying to release herself of her worries in first week of January 1900. Wilson and Farmer ran into friends Josephine Locke and Elizabeth Knudson aboard ship – and eventually learned they were on the way to see ʻAbdu'l-Bahá who was leader of a new religion and had in their possession an early prayer book. Wilson was dubious but eventually the ladies changed their plans and went along. They waited in Egypt where there are pictures of her with Mírzá Abu'l-Faḍl and scenes there, before leaving for Haifa March 23, 1900.

A few years later her friend Mary Hanford Ford related some of what took place meeting ʻAbdu'l-Bahá as a second hand account. A few facts are detailed - Farmer had met ʻAbdu'l-Bahá and accepted the religion on one occasion, and on another wanted to ask him a series of questions in the context of a review of her whole life - but when she wrote it all down she left the notebook in the hurry of being called to come to him in the early morning. She reported he answered the questions spontaneously and in the right order starting in such a way that the translator was confused because no question had been asked. At the end of that interview she cried "... strange tears of ecstatic happiness, and went to her room to recover the composure which had been shaken by these surprising and illuminating events." This list of questions is referred to in another briefer recollection. Anise Rideout had a similar record of the incident. Rideout reports that ʻAbdu'l-Bahá wrote an inscription in Farmer's Bible dated March 26. For Maria Wilson's part she also joined the religion and was the first Baháʼí to move to Boston.

After being in Haifa and Egypt the women also spent some time in Paris among a small group of Baháʼís after the visit, and Rome.

==== Back at Greenacre ====
The Summer 1900 program went on without Farmer, though the Monsalvat school was suspended that year. Farmer returned to the United States in November, injured on arrival according to one account. There were also reports that the translator at the meeting had come to the United States with Farmer on the return voyage. She was noted back in Eliot in May 1901. An organizational meeting came together May 22 and dedicated a site on nearby "Mount Monsalvat", as Farmer called it, to eventually host a school. Kate C. Ives was among those present. That Spring of 1901 she also met with Phoebe Hearst, who herself had been to see ʻAbdu'l-Bahá a few years earlier and she too had adopted the religion.

Farmer was publicly linked with the religion in June 1901. Of the Baháʼí Faith, it was explained, "... she has found the common faith in which all devout souls may unite and yet be free." At the time there were some 700 Baháʼís in the United States.

Amidst her conflict with Janes and newfound attachment to the Baháʼí Faith she offered free classes in parallel, even conflicting on time, with Janes' Monsalvat school classes. In 1901 the charge for the entire season of classes with Janes' group was five dollars for the Monsalvat school – in inflation terms that would be $140 in 2014.

Schmidt featured Farmer and Greenacre in a chapter "Freedom and Self-Surrender" of a book Restless Souls: The Making of American Spirituality published by the University of California Press in 2012:

The struggle at the heart of liberal spirituality ... was over the firmness and fragility of religious identity in the modern world. ... Was the point precisely the freedom of spiritual seeking? Or was the real point to find a well-marked path and to submit to the disciplines of a new religious authority in order to submerge the self in a larger relationship to God and community? ... Farmer's eventual acceptance of the Baha'i faith or "the Persian Revelation" ... discomfited her liberal, universalistic friends, many of whom preferred ongoing inquiry to actually finding one path to follow. For Farmer, the vision that she found in the Baha'i faith of a new age of religious unity, racial reconciliation, gender equality, and global peace was the fulfillment of Transcendentalism's reform impulses and progressivism's millennial dreams. To her skeptical associates, her turn to the Persian Revelation represented a betrayal of their deepest ideals as free-ranging seekers whose vision of a cosmopolitan piety dimmed at the prospect of one movement serving as a singular focus for the universal religion.

Nevertheless, Farmer focused the efforts of the institution on Baháʼí themes. In her words in 1902:

My joy in the Persian Revelation is not that it reveals one of the streams flowing to the great Ocean of Life, Light and Love, but that it is a perfect mirror of that Ocean. What, in Green Acre, was a vision and a hope becomes, through it a blessed reality now. It has illuminated for me every other expression of Truth which I had hitherto known and place my feet on a Rock from which they cannot be moved. And it is the Manifestation of the Fatherhood - Behá'u'lláh (ed - as it was spelled in those days) - who had taught me to look away from even the Greatest and find within the One 'Powerful, Mighty, and Supreme' who is to be the Redeemer of my life. It is a Revelation of Unity such as I had never before found. By means of its Light, as shown the life of the Master Abbas Abdul Beha, I have entered into a joy greater than any I have hitherto known. Green Acre was established as a means to that end and in proportion as well lay aside all spirit of criticism of others and seek only to live the Unity we find, shall we be able to help others to the same divine realization.

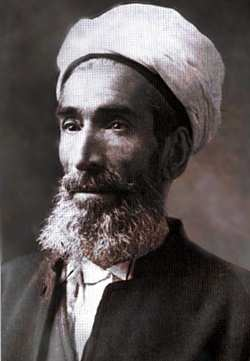
Mírzá Abu'l-Faḍl-i-Gulpáygání

Farmer opened the 1901 session at Greenacre with an address "The Revelation of Baháʼu'lláh and its relation to the Monsalvat School" while others gave related talks – "The New Jerusalem, or the City We Want", "Lecture on the Persian Revelation", and "Utterances of Baháʼu'lláh." Mírzá Abu'l-Faḍl, among the most scholarly trained Baháʼís of the time, was there, and his talk was "Lectures on the Revelations of the Báb and Baháʼu'lláh of Persia". Ali Kuli Khan, to serve as his translator, arrived in the United States in June. Abu'l-Faḍl had accompanied Anton Haddad, the first Baháʼí to live in the United States, on his return trip to America. They had been sent by ʻAbdu'l-Bahá. The later well known Baháʼí Agnes Baldwin Alexander, later appointed to a high office of the religion, was also there. Esther Davis reports others were there that summer of 1901: she herself, Raffii, the translator at one of Farmer's meetings with ʻAbdu'l-Bahá, and "Mother Beecher" (Ellen Tuller Beecher.) Mary Hanford Ford was there giving one of her talks on literature, and it was at these classes with Abu'l-Faḍl it is considered she joined the religion. Out of this the community of Baháʼís began to form in Boston. Farmer and ʻAbdu'l-Bahá began an active exchange of letters some twenty-plus of his which were gathered and printed initially in 1909 and then the third edition in 1919.

Nevertheless, Farmer did not embark on a heavy handed approach to the presence of the religion and made various compromises to limit its mention and presence, and this fits the Baháʼí teaching about not proselytizing. Her problems did not go away though Janes suddenly died in the fall of 1901. A memorial was held at Greenacre September 6. Fillmore Moore, the director of the Comparative Religion school after Janes, continued the criticism. Others sided with Janes' views including Sanborn and investor Sara Chapman Bull. Meanwhile, a number of eastern teachers presenting their own religions, beyond those of the Baháʼís themselves, began to appear officially on the programs of Monsalvat School beyond those of academically interested non-believers - Muslim Shehadi Abd-Allah Shehadi in 1901, (and later lived in Providence, RI and had a park named after him,) Buddhist Sister Sanghamitta before she left for India as a new convert, B. S. Kimura of Japan, in 1902, Dharmpala, M. Barukatulah, Baha Premanand in 1904, and C. Jinaradadaen in 1905. Fadl and Khan were profiled along with a review of the religion in 1903.

Ralph Waldo Trine wrote a book while at Greenacre and published it in 1903. Additionally music concerts became more common – one of the first was directed by early Baháʼí Edward Kinney. Myron H. Phelps, as part of the transition of the Monsalvat School in his position as director in 1904 and 5 gave a talk on the religion at the 1904 conference following his 1903 book, (though it was later judged to be full of inaccuracies by the Baháʼís.) Articles based on the work were printed in various journals, some noting Greenacre as well.

In the face of the changing realms of support Phoebe Hearst was particularly stabilizing for Farmer in 1902 followed by Helen E. Cole in 1906. Another factor in the progress of Greenacre was that steamer boat service from Portsmouth ran regularly in 1895, and the arrival of electric train service in Eliot near the hotel in 1902. Finally in 1902 Farmer initiated a voluntary board – a "Fellowship" – "a sustaining body to help carry forward the Green Acre Conferences of which Sarah J. Farmer is the director." Amidst this Farmer's personal home burned to the ground in 1904, and Randolph Bolles, whose sister and niece were well known Baháʼís, took up residence living there until he died in 1939.

Green Acre and Boston

==== Year of Peace ====
In 1904 and 1905 Japanese diplomats visited Greenacre – Yokoyama Taikan, Okakura Kakuzō and Kentok Hori, signing Farmer's autograph book with quotations and drawings for a special tea service and presentations. As an institution Greenacre developed a brief set of "branch" associations including one in Washington D.C. in 1905 that began to host peace conferences.

Farmer's connections and determination for peace was such that she was present at the signing of the Portsmouth Peace Treaty and indeed was the only woman on the naval base. The event was remembered in more recent times. Diplomats from the treaty meeting attended functions at Greenacre. Some 300 attended, including a few reporters from Japan, though President Roosevelt and the Russian delegation did not. There were several talks presented on peace including by Minister Takahira and Ali Kuli Khan, who, in a letter to his wife Florence Breed Khan, called it the most important day in the history of Green Acre to that point.

At the same time a few became interested in the Baháʼí Faith at Green Acre – Harlan Ober and Alfred E. Lunt were Bostonians who joined the religion in the summer of 1905 at Greenacre with Ober learning of the religion first through Lua Getsinger and Alice Buckton, and then Lunt learned of the religion from Ober.

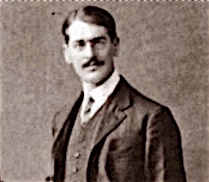
Harlan Ober in 1907

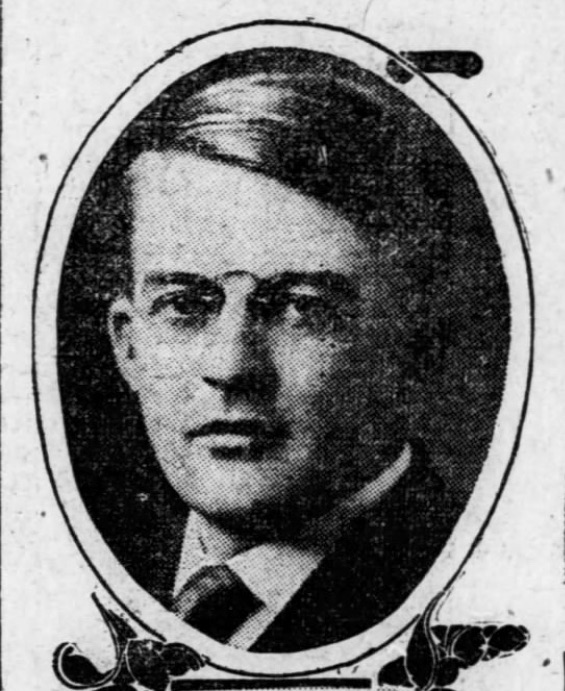
Alfred E. Lunt (1910)

Ober had been in shipping interests. Ober and Lunt were leaders in Republican party politics on college campuses, in the era of the Fourth Party System also known as the Progressive Era. About 1905 a formal board to supervise Greenacre called the "Green Acre Fellowship" superseded the earlier voluntary one and was arranged with five trustees – Francis Keefe, Aldred E. Lunt, Horatio Dresser, Maria Wilson, and Fillmore Moore, (two were Baháʼí, three not.)

In the summer of 1906 Stanwood Cobb learned of the religion from a series of articles in the Boston Transcript and went to Green Acre to learn more. He conversed with Sarah Farmer. Thornton Chase, the "first occidental Baháʼí" was also there giving a series of talks. It was on that occasion that Cobb joined the religion. Others were also there giving talks, as well as a meeting of civil war veterans. Ponnambalam Ramanathan's talk that year was featured in the Boston Evening Transcript.

Others also came to Greenacre. In 1906 among others noted, then Third assistant Secretary of State Huntington Wilson, then retired General O. O. Howard, and Ex-Governor John Green Brady of Alaska all gave talks or hosted meetings. Marsden Hartley took a job as a handyman there and through his association he secured his first exhibition, and was friends with Ober and Lunt.

=== 1907–1912 ===
In 1907 it was still possible to review things at Greenacre without mentioning Baháʼís. May Wright Sewall spoke in 1907 at Green Acre. Newspaper coverage began to cover the division and resolution at Greenacre and Farmer managed to keep the reputation of Greenacre high through 1907. Coverage of events occurred in Indianapolis.

Baháʼís sometimes objected that contradictory ideas were presented together while others sometimes objected there was too much Baháʼí coverage. ʻAbdu'l-Bahá's advise to Farmer was to be more direct about the religion and less supportive of "mouldered, two thousand years old superstitions". However, in 1907 other events took hold when, at the age of 60, Farmer fell off a train car in Boston, was injured and never fully recovered. She checked herself into McLean Hospital possibly with a severe injury to her back, when it was a sanitorium.

The 1908 season went on though with perhaps a reduced schedule. Fillmore Moore pressed her to surrender the right of trustee appointing and issued a pained statement in 1909. Writer Diane Iverson feels Farmer progressed in her hospitalization over a broken heart from the contention over Greenacre. Her care transferred to a private duty nurse in Portsmouth and from there, when she "became 'too much to handle'", into the care of early psychologist Dr. Edward Cowles.

Farmer's last public appearance at Green Acre was in 1909. The season was successful with singer Mary Lucas (who had joined the religion in 1905,) and many others. That year the Green Acre Fellowship board voted to rebuild Farmer's residence on the site of her father's home at a cost of $5000.

Farmer changed her will to bequeath Greenacre to the Baháʼís in the event of her death via an agent of Phoebe Hearst. Her family involuntarily committed her to a mental institution in July 1910, At the same time the by-laws of the institution allowed Farmer to appoint 3 of its 5 trustees, fill vacancies, and remove any of the trustees. All this was just before the centenary of the town of Eliot itself was celebrated including at Greenacre. Meanwhile, early Canadian Baháʼís, the Magees, began to be regular summer visitors. Among the several presenters and singers were a few Baháʼís, as well as W. E. B. Du Bois and Swami Paramananda. Ali Kuli Khan was appointed Iranian Charge D'Affaires in Washington D. C. in 1910.

A review of the history of Greenacre was published in 1911 in the local paper though there was more description of the alienness of Vivekananda in racist terms. The season had many speakers.

==== ʻAbdu'l-Bahá in the area ====
ʻAbdu'l-Bahá, then head of the religion, embarked on travels to the West following release from imprisonment. While the regular season at Greenacre ran in July, he was there from 16 to 23 August.

ʻAbdu'l-Bahá referred to renaming it "Green Acre" vs "Greenacre" in relation to the Baháʼí presence where the founder of the religion is buried - referring to Acre, Syria. Though Farmer herself referred to "Green Acre" since 1902 and publicly in 1903 and the formation documents of the Fellowship also used "Green Acre" - nevertheless Schmidt notes the change in use as a dividing line among the groups involved. Another name sometimes used is "Green-acre-on-the-Piscataqua" dating from 1897 and in modern times. Greenacre itself as a name for the site seems to predate the building of the hotel.

Some five or eight hundred people were there to hear ʻAbdu'l-Bahá's first talk. The talk was about ways of knowing the truth – he disavowed individual approaches like pure reason, simple authority, individual inspiration, etc., but affirmed:

[A] statement presented to the mind accompanied by proofs which the senses can perceive to be correct, which the faculty of reason can accept, which is in accord with traditional authority and sanctioned by the promptings of the heart, can be adjudged and relied upon as perfectly correct, for it has been proved and tested by all the standards of judgment and found to be complete.

Some repudiated their former beliefs in the sanctity in pure inspiration.

ʻAbdu'l-Bahá then visited Farmer at her home.

That evening ʻAbdu'l-Bahá addressed the audience at the Eirenion and he wrote a prayer for Farmer. He was in the program speaking August 16, 17, 18, and 19 with Herbert Peckham speaking at most of the remaining schedule of the week. Several of ʻAbdu'l-Bahá's talks were gathered and published in The Promulgation of Universal Peace pages 253–275. He also visited the homes of other Baháʼís – Mason Remey, Carrie and Edward Kinney. At other talks members of the audience wept during his prayers or fainted. He spoke to a girls club camp group by the river on August 19. In a letter he declared Farmer was not insane but experiencing "religious exultation" and not suffering from female hysteria as these things were viewed in the day. He met with individuals on other days at Green Acre or the home of Kate Ives, the first woman member of the religion, offering advice and a listening ear to each.

Fred Mortensen arrived August 20. Mortensen had been a criminal that fled arrest – his lawyer was Baháʼí Albert Hall of Minnesota from whom he learned of the religion. Riding from Minneapolis to Cleveland he then went on to Green Acre – all by way of Freighthopping. Being introduced in a crowd he was embarrassed at his dirty appearance and then was told to sit down amid the company of people in fine dress and wait but soon ʻAbdu'l-Bahá returned and began to speak closely with Mortensen His inquiry revealed how Mortensen had traveled.

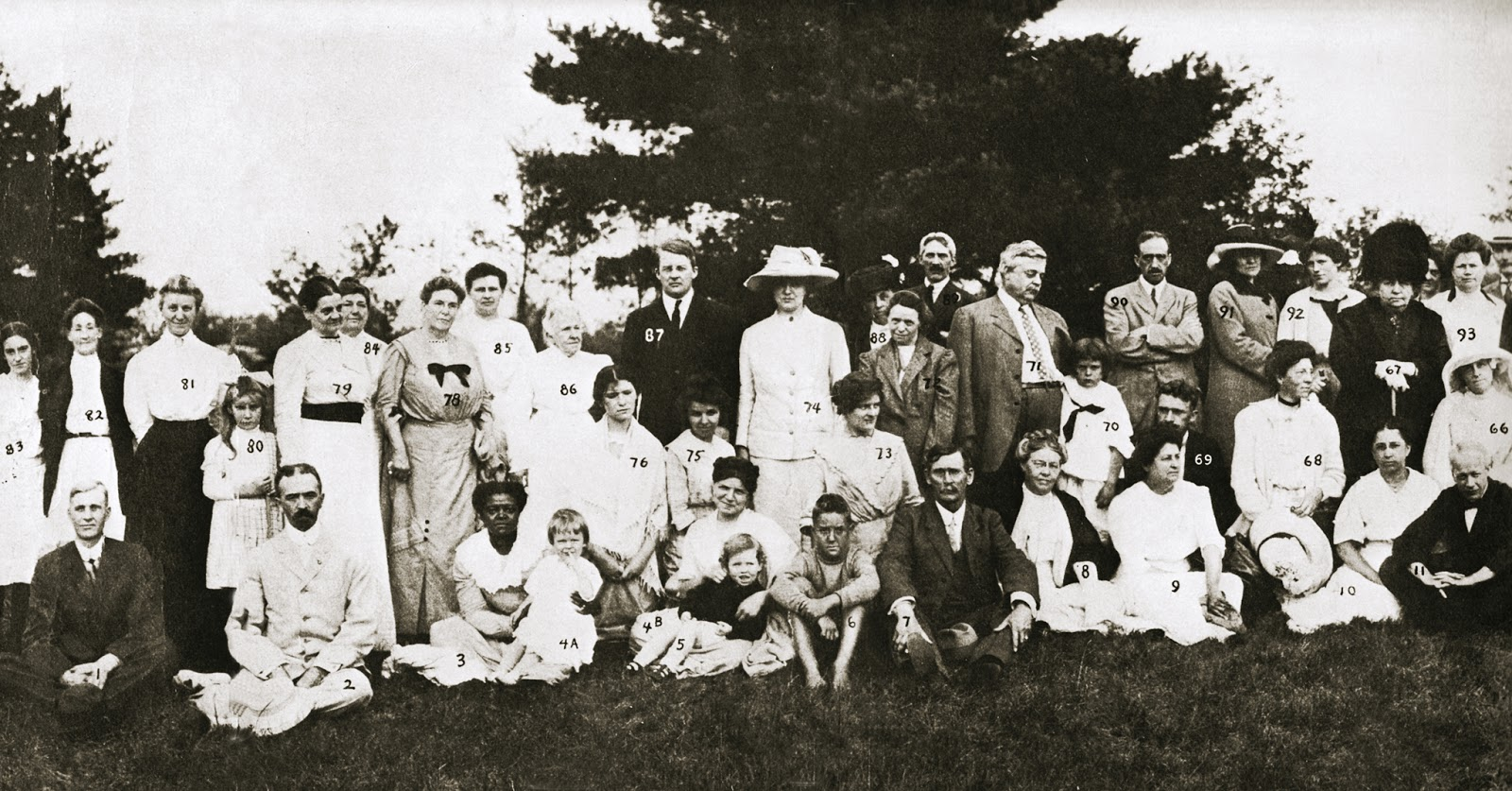
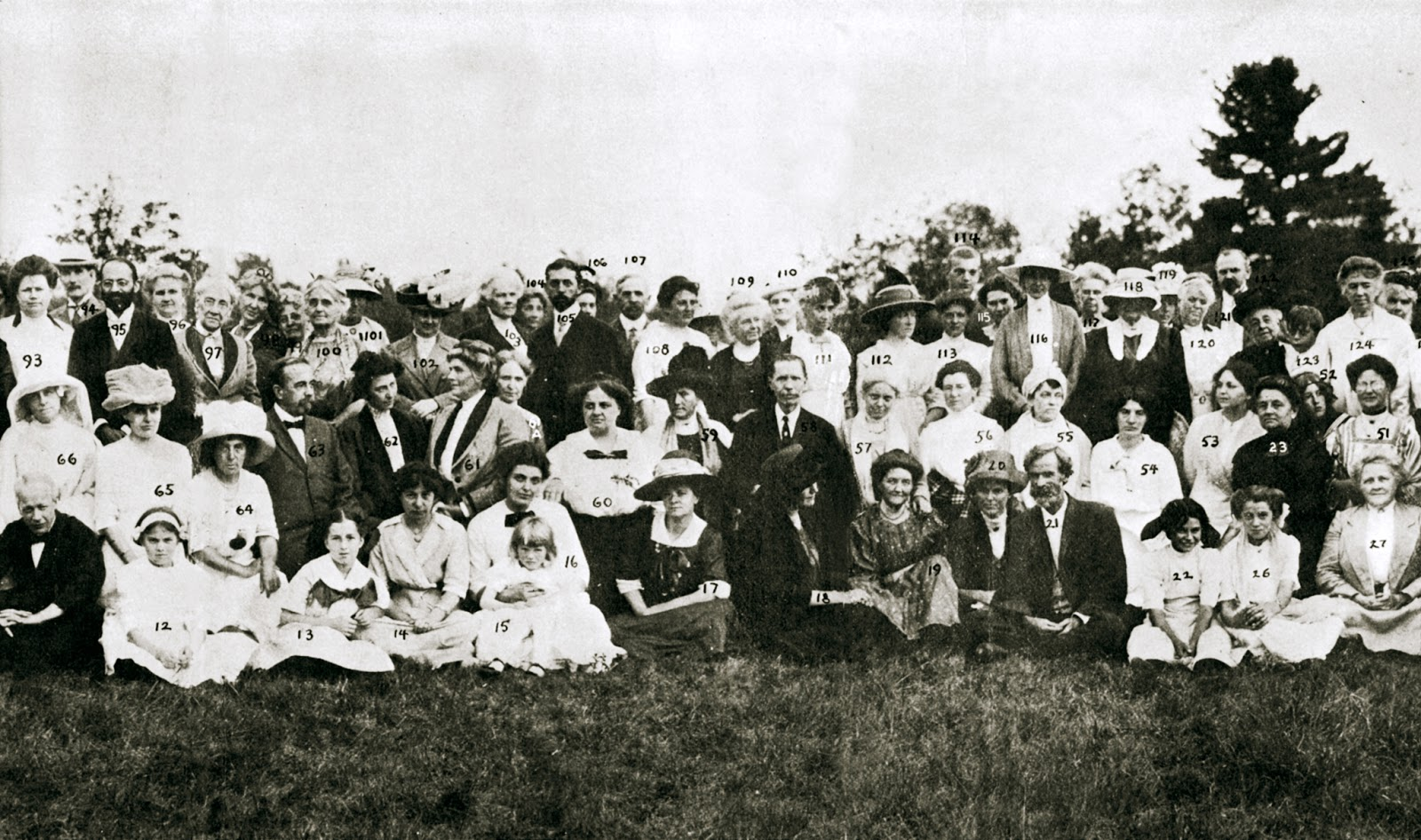
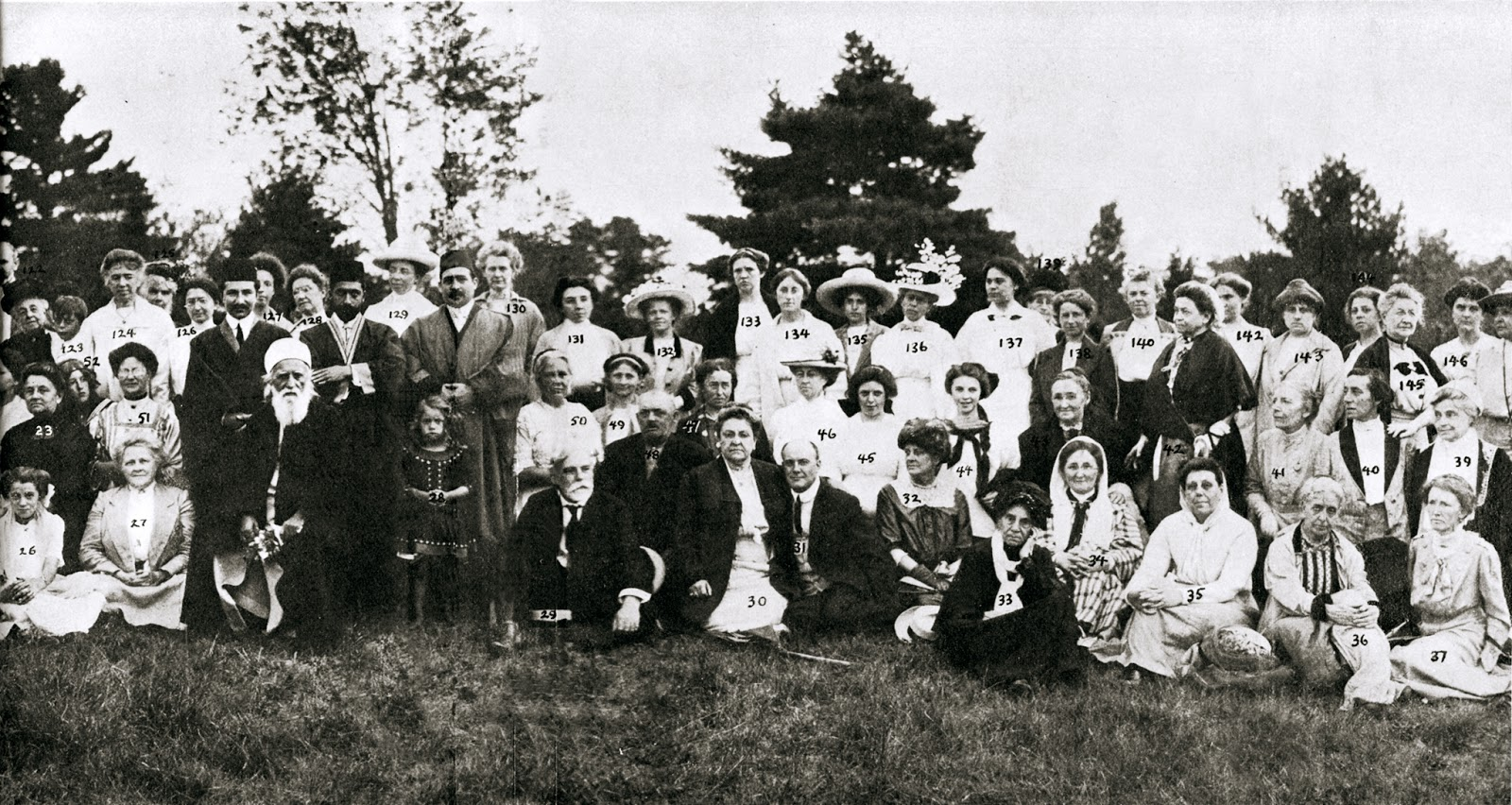
Panorama of those at feast of ʻAbdu'l-Bahá at Green Acre;
ʻAbdu'l-Bahá is seated in the right most picture on the far left.

Mortensen had arrived on a day ʻAbdu'l-Baha had arranged as a feast which was held on "Mount Monsalvat" and a large panomramic picture taken. Mortensen is seated farthest on the left. Farmer was also reportedly there led by the hand by ʻAbdu'l-Bahá across the hill for a few minutes and had a long conversation then publicly pointed out the area would be host to the second Baháʼí Temple for America as well as a university and then praised Farmer openly.

There followed a few more talks and farewell visits on topics like elimination of prejudice. He was said to characterize the work as "like that of the exhausted iron worker's apprentice whose master said to him 'Die, but pump.'

ʻAbdu'l-Bahá again visited Farmer and they went on a car tour including a stop to view the shipyard where the treaty had been signed. On the return trip she was not allowed to step off the car when it stopped at Green Acre.

On the last day at Green Acre he met with individuals and then left stopping at Farmer's hospitalization again this time by carriage – she wept at his feet on that occasion.

== Baháʼí management ==
=== 1913–1916 ===
With news that Farmer was visible, if only briefly, her health was celebrated, but the "more urgent" appeal by some was to warn people that Green Acre was "threatened with dire calamity" in June 1913. A meeting in June seemed to present a calm front, and noted Farmer had previously appointed a guardian while she was indisposed, but the controversy continued in July. What had happened was that the terms of the trust Green Acre had specified authority resting on Farmer as long as she could direct the program. However, in 1913 she could not and a re-arrangement was undertaken by the board allowing a trustee to run the conference and maintain the program - a step feared by the Sanborn and Fillmore affiliated groups. Sanborn published arguments over rights of access. Public rallies were echoed in print in Open Court and newspapers especially opposing a sense of the religious self-surrender and the foreignness of the Baháʼí Faith. Nevertheless, the board was expanded to nine members and William Randall, shipping businessman and Baháʼí since before 1912, was appointed a trustee, and only one was not a Baháʼí. Scary headlines in various places continued near and far. A program was carried on regardless. Kate Ives, the first Baháʼí of Boston, wrote a letter to the editor inviting Portsmouth residents to a talk on the religion. Debates began about who was Farmer's guardian started in January 1914 with news there was another guardian of her affairs. But Farmer then had been declared sane in February, though the matter was raised again in March when Farmer's family sought to have her guardian appointed by them. Amidst partisan charges in the newspaper the doctor agreed Farmer was sane and competent to run her own affairs in June.

Meanwhile, in May 1914 Alfred E. Lunt was elect to the national leadership of the religion along with William Randall.

The controversy at Green Acre grew more tense. In July Farmer's mental condition was challenged with complaints and support statements all brought into court again as well as the rightful jurisdiction of two guardians of Farmer raised to superior courts.

The July 1914 program at Green Acre went on – it included a talk by later Baháʼí Howard Colby Ives which was printed in the newspaper, as well as Alice Breed, Alfred E. Lunt, and others, while others gave protesting talks from the street. The Fellowship board of Green Acre had argued over money ultimately in court which was settled, but the propriety of the expanded elected board was affirmed and required by-law amendments to be not just by the trustees but by the whole group of investors.

Early Canadian Baháʼí Hariet Magee died at Green Acre in January 1915. Early in 1915 Randall oversaw the electrification of the Inn and driveway. Following the Baháʼí participation at the Panama–Pacific International Exposition in spring 1915, Lunt again served on the national board of Baháʼís in the United States; this time as president, with Ober as secretary. Baháʼís then began to buy several neighboring properties to Green Acre. Still Farmer was not released from hospitalization despite several rounds of judging her sane and fit to mind her own affairs and she had been treated with drugs and electroshock therapy. Now Baháʼís began to plan for Farmer's release - primarily William Randall, Urbain Ledoux, and Montford Mills – and tried various approaches. Ultimately they gathered a chief of police and a judge to accompany a court order with some intercepting the doctor physically and others carried Farmer to a waiting car to effect her freedom. A cousin of Farmer, Helen Green, also participated and recorded her testimony retained in the Baháʼí national archives. Randall and Ober and others were visible at Green Acre a week later. Farmer managed to have her next birthday in comparative freedom, quietly. ʻAbdu'l-Bahá praised the work freeing Farmer. There was a session that summer at Green Acre.

The case was appealed questioning jurisdiction in the argument over guardians in late 1915. The courts settled the case over guardianship against Sanborn's group in 1916. Meanwhile, the donation of Helen Cole in 1902 was set for building what became called the Fellowship House constructed in the middle 1916. Farmer was interviewed in the Boston Post in August during which the reporter had an experience he couldn't explain, (though there also several typos in the article and mis-labeling), and Farmer then died in November, while walking in her family cemetery. There was a guard to protect her body lest it be taken. Sanborn called for an official inquiry of her death. The eulogy was read by Kate Ives and attending were Lunt, Ober and Randall among others of Boston and the area - Ober was noted an officer of Green Acre along with Lunt. With Farmer and her Will supporting the Baháʼís the case ended. The transcendentalists school were, to put it mildly, upset, as were the supporters of the academic school. The Baháʼís inherited the $25k in debt too. Though at the time the newspaper coverage was dismissive over her work, modern coverage noted "She anticipated the peace movement, women's liberation and the New Age culture." Farmer's contribution was considered a "singularly important" to the development of Baháʼí schools. Posthumously, Shoghi Effendi, later head of the religion, appointed her as one of the Disciples of ʻAbdu'l-Bahá. Baháʼís noted her individual service as raising a status of organization vs institutionalization, setting a place for the rise of some of Americas' most active supporters of the religion, and the very nature of that place. However, liberal religious idealization noticed that a democratic system had awarded Green Acre to sectarian view. It is true that before 1900 there were about a half dozen Baháʼís in New England and that most of the growth of the religion in the region is attributed to the work done at Green Acre.

There is no record of a summer session in 1916. Ober wrote a letter to the editor about the religion and Green Acre earlier in August.

=== Green Acre and contributing to the national leadership ===
The 1917 Spring national convention of Baháʼís with meetings held at Green Acre and Boston. In 1917 William Randall was again elected to the national board of the religion and that year he was elected as president of the board and Harlan Ober was elected to the board as well. Among the speakers on the summer schedule at Green Acre in 1917 were Horace Holley, Randall, Albert R. Vail, Louis G. Gregory, Eshteal Ebn Kalanter, Lunt, and Albert Hall. Randall spoke at Green Acre on "The mission of Green Acre" and another "Talks of ʻAbdu'l-Bahá" as well as others by Frederick Strong on several topics as well as Edward Getsinger.

The military discussed taking over the Green Acre property for its workmen in 1918. Randall was again elected to the national board of the religion, this time as treasurer, in 1918. Though the Inn did not open there was still a summer session with James F. Morton Jr. and a national Esperanto conference being held. Martha Root attended. And Mr and Mrs. Ober, Lunt, and May Maxwell were noted in the services for the funeral program for a close friend of Farmer who died. Randall along with Juliet Thompson, May Maxwell and Albert Vail, debated the position of Green Acre on whether to raise the Peace Flag and ultimately decided it should be raised. Prayers were said at Green Acre to end World War I.

Randall was on Baháʼí pilgrimage after the war, in 1919 and ʻAbdu'l-Bahá encouraged him to continue the work of Farmer at Green Acre. Randall served as the administrator of Green Acre from 1919 to 1929 when he died. Harlan Ober was at the 1919 national convention of Baháʼís was held in New York. The 1919 convention was a major event in the religion because it was also the place the Tablets of the Divine Plan of ʻAbdu'l-Bahá were published.

Traveling teacher of the religion Fádil Mazandarání gave several talks at Green Acre in 1920. Randall was elected to the national board again in 1920 as treasurer and addressed the convention. Randall was listed as the contact for announcing events and reserving rooms at Green Acre in 1920 by Albert Vail.

Siegfried Schopflocher, later to become another Hand of the Cause, joined the religion at Green Acre in 1921 and helped improve the property. A Tea House and gift shop were established. Paul Haney and May Maxwell were also known at the facility in 1921. A major memorial for the death of ʻAbdu'l-Bahá was held in 1922. Otherwise there is no known program in 1921. In 1922 a program was carried on by Louis Gregory, Albert Watson, Juliet Putnam, George Latimer, Mr. and Mrs. Aldo Randagger, Mrs. E. Boye, W H Randall. Randall was appointed to the supervisory board of the Baháʼí periodical Star of the West in 1922, and contributed an article on Green Acre. In 1923 he was noted as chairman of the board of Green Acre while continuing as treasurer for the newly designated National Spiritual Assembly. A general renovation was begun in 1921 and completed in 1924 – repairs, painting, and clearing away scrub growth, etc., was done. A program went on in 1923 with Fádil Mazandarání giving a talk, among the program that summer. The "Eirenion" burned down in 1924, right before the summer season of Green Acre was held with an international theme and presence and the first appearance of Glenn A. Shook, professor of Wheaton College (Massachusetts).

In 1925 there were a number of developments. First the national convention was held at Green Acre. Famous African-American leader Alain Locke, a Baháʼí since 1918, spoke at the 1925 convention. Second, the national election was held under new rules fully endorsed by the head of the religion. That year a local assembly was elected for the first time in Eliot. And lastly it was announced the administrative offices of the religion would be run from Green Acre. The members of the Eliot local assembly were – Horace and Doris Holley, Kate Ives, Ivy Drew Edwards, Marion Jack, Colonel Henry and Mary Culver, Ella Roberts and Phillip Marangella. Lunt was noted on the board of trustees of Green Acre. Baháʼí Mary Lucas who had performed at Green Acre several times held her professional school for singers there.

While the history of persecution of Baháʼís in Persia goes back some many years the first known newspaper mention in the area was in 1926. That summer the program was "Green Acre Summer School of World Unity" in August. But the National Assembly acquired direct authority of the Green Acre establishment. At the same time the national assembly began a "Plans of Unified Action" process that included a plan to centralize all Baháʼí funding of projects through one national fund including Green Acre resulting in a learning process for the assembly and the community in maintaining priorities in a nationwide context – a process that extended into the 1930s during the Great Depression. Education reformer Stanwood Cobb established "Mast Cove Camp" at Eliot that year too.

=== Programs and model ===
In 1927 Green Acre hosted its first Race Amity Convention in mid-July following an initiative push by Shoghi Effendi, then head of the religion, in April. The first convention had been held in Washington D.C. in 1921 followed by a lapse, and this 1927 convention was arranged by a committee appointed by the US Baháʼí National Spiritual Assembly – Agnes Parsons, Coralie F. Cook, Louis Gregory, Zia Bagdadi, Alain Locke, Elizabeth G. Hopper and Isabel Ives, (though Locke appears on the program he did not actually speak at the convention.) Prominent contributors at the convention included Devere Allen of The World Tomorrow, Samuel McComb of the Emmanuel Movement, Rev. William Stafford Jones and recent pilgrims Edwina Powell and S. E. J. Oglesby. According to Louis Gregory he had to chair one of the sessions "so that the affair would not be too one-sided" in the face of low participation despite "a little under-current of bad feeling" among some Baháʼís. This proved the first of a series of annual race amity conferences. However, the event turned out to be so successful that money from the national budget to support the event was in fact covered by generous individuals caught up in the event and instead the allotment of about $400,(a little over $5400 in 2014 dollars,) was returned to be contributed to the costs for building the American Baháʼí Temple. There was a peace program the following August. Among the attendes was African-American Beatrice Morrow Cannady, who wrote in her newspaper, the Portland (Oregon) Advocate, of the peace conference; there was also coverage published separately in the Portland (Maine) Press Herald of general impressions and history of Green Acre, with a couple of pictures for that season. Cannady spoke at the peace conference about her going to the Pan-African Congress that year, held in New York, which inspired the Obers and Sadie and Mabry Oglesby to go to the congress.

The success of Green Acre as a Baháʼí institution began to inspire other regional schools for the religion: first came Bosch Baháʼí School becoming more formally a Baháʼí school in 1927 and another in 1931 at Louhelen Baháʼí School.

The pace of race amity meetings continued nationwide for Baháʼís into 1928 when it was again held at Green Acre in August. Randall also took part in it. Perhaps Randall's final appearance was August 1928 at a commemoration of the visit of ʻAbdu'l-Bahá to Green Acre. Randall died Feb 11, 1929. Meanwhile, in 1928 Ober gave a talk in Brooklyn, and Grace hosted an evening social at Green Acre. That year the official board of Green Acre, the "Fellowship", formally deeded Green Acre to a trustees appointed by the National Spiritual Assembly of the Baháʼís of the United States. Lunt served on the national assembly that year.

The regular program at Green Acre ran in 1930 with talks and services by Albert Vail, Glenn Shook, Stanwood Cobb, Genevieve Coy, Doris Gregory, Allen McDaniel, A B Herst, Mrs Willard McKay, and Louis Gregory. A third Race Amity Convention was also held at Green Acre that year despite the onset of The Great Depression and among which officers of the national Urban League assisted. The 1931 summer conference included a talk by William Leo Hansberry of Howard University discussing the science behind recognizing "Negro civilizations in Ancient Africa". In the 1930s Genevieve Coy directed studies at Green Acre and more formal classes were undertaken than lectures – on languages and Baháʼí texts for example. Fundraising at Green Acre was undertaken to aid in the construction of the Baháʼí House of Worship (Wilmette, Illinois). By 1932 both Farmer and Randall were noted as Disciples of ʻAbdu'l-Bahá. The 1932 season was noted in Pittsburgh, Pennsylvania. The Ober family purchased a home near Green Acre in 1932 in the midst of the Great Depression, and Harlan soon was reading on the radio at Portsmouth's WHEB station weekly after noon from spring into the fall from 1933 into 1935 (with occasional gaps). Grace spoke at the Portsmouth chapter of Hadassah and Ober was also visible at other events – a funeral, and several series of talks in 1933. In 1933 he also gave a program series on "Psychology and Life" for Alpha Beta sorority and a ladies club. The regular summer season at Green Acre took place. Glenn Shook's talk was profiled in the local paper. And a "Race Amity Conference" was held too, following which Gregory expressed satisfaction with the now long history of Race Amity meetings at Green Acre despite the economic troubles during the Great Depression.

A Race Amity Convention was held at a time when few others were being held across the country in August 1934. It proved to be the last in the 1930s. In 1936 the national assembly had noted that race amity meetings had sometimes emphasized race differences rather than unity and reconciliation when held at a national level and instead asked local communities to provide meetings which a few communities continued to do later into the 1930s. In November Ober gave a talk in Eliot for the Christian Endeavor Society, and Zeta Alpha Men's Club of a Baptist church. The family wintered in New York to February 1935, and their college student daughter visited them in the summer of 1935. There was also smaller race amity conference that year as part of the general session. It hosted week long course on "Racial likenesses and differences: the scientific evidence and the Baháʼí Teachings" by Genevieve Coy and there were individual talks by Coy, Glenn Shook, Standwood Cobb, Lunt and Samuel Chiles Mitchell, past president of the University of South Carolina (1909–1913).

Ober was a substitute speaker in January 1936 at Green Acre, and lead a funeral there. The Summer schedule at Green Acre went on including Montford Mills, Louis G. Gregory, Manses L. Sato, Dorothy Beecher Baker, Mary Collison, Hishmat Alai, and featuring Stanwood Cobb. Then there was another "Race Amity" session during the summer session of the school. The structure of the classes and offerings at Green Acre further transitioned from summer conferencing to focused classes that year too noting participation by Horace Holley, Edward H. Adams, Louis G. Gregory with music by Evelyn Loveday, sessions by Mrs. M. B. Trotman, Maxwell Miller, Mrs. Bishp Lewis, Ludmilla Bechtold, Theodore C. A. McCardy, and more music by Martha Boutwell.

After serving on the national assembly off an on into the 1930s Lunt died from an illness in 1937 and Shoghi Effendi asked the entire national assembly to assemble at his gravesite on his behalf in Boston. That year a Hall was built replacing the burned down Eirenion a decade earlier and the fourth floor of the Inn was renovated.

Grace Ober died immediately after giving a talk at the Chicago Baháʼí national convention in April 1938 – Harlan was then serving on the national spiritual assembly after traveling in Louisville Kentucky. Harlan gave the next talk at Green Acre that July 1938, and the August schedule for Green Acre took place. Ober then toured universities in December, and served on the Green Acre summer committee for the school in 1939. The 1939 season at Green Acre went on with among the teachers Louis Gregory, and Horace Holley and officers of the program committee including Mrs. Harold Bowman, Ober, Lorna Tasker and Marjorie Wheeler; and there was a focus on discussing international problems.

=== Nancy Bowditch ===
Also known as Mrs. Harold Bowditch, Nancy was the daughter of George de Forest Brush who was active in Dublin, New Hampshire, as well as Europe. Though she was among those who had met ʻAbdu-l-Bahá at Green Acre her life changed with the unexpected death of her husband shortly after and she and her new child soon moved away - it wasn't until she came across the religion again in 1927 and heard Randal speak that she considered the religion. This may have been an event the Boston Baháʼí community hosted called a "World Unity Conference" as part of a series sponsored by the National Spiritual Assembly of the Baháʼís of the United States. A report of the conference was published in the Boston Evening Transcript. Randall helped organize and spoke at it. She then credits Randall, Louise Drake Wright and her sister Mrs. George Nelson as aiding her inquiry into the religion while she read books like Baháʼu'lláh and the New Era. She officially joined the religion in 1929. She was visible in the 1930 Race Amity Convention held at Green Acre, and left on Baháʼí pilgrimage in late March 1931 with her then 19 yr old daughter. They spent three weeks in the area of Haifa and left by way of Jerusalem taking in Christian paths of pilgrimage. She then attended the 1931 national convention reporting on events in Boston as the chair of the Boston Assembly.

Bowditch repeated her activity at the Green Acre Race Amity conference in 1934 including an event at her home. In 1936 she assisted in World Order magazine publications with some cover art. In 1937 she offered a talk for the summer program at Green Acre that also dedicated a new hall. In 1938 she took up residence in a summer studio at Green Acre and ran a program on art for the school. There is a break in visible activity in 1940 and her father died April 24, 1941, but she was again involved at Green Acre in July 1941 for a pageant. After another year gap in activity she was on the centenary committee of 1943–44, to commemorate the founding of the religion in 1844. In Portsmouth she offered a program at the Baháʼí library about her pilgrimage, as well as at Green Acre. She was on the maintenance committee for Green Acre across 1945–1947. In Teaneck, New Jersey she offered a program for youth on dramatizations of the religion, and her poem "The Song of Tahirih" was published in July 1947 World Order magazine. In 1948 she was listed as the corresponding secretary of the Baháʼí group of Brookline, Massachusetts, and offered a program in nearby Hamilton, Massachusetts. Her mother died in 1949. In 1950 she published a play "The desert tent: An Easter play in three episodes".

In 1953 Bowditch was noted helping a Portsmouth community pageant, and her family moved to Peterborough, New Hampshire, in the south of the state in 1959, attended the 1963 Baháʼí World Congress with her husband and a granddaughter, and in 1965 Bowditch is pictured on the first local Spiritual Assembly of Peterborough, the local administrative organization of the religion.

1972 she was noted for a Portsmouth Friends of the Library, spoke at Meriden Connecticut on her memory of meeting ʻAbdu'l-Bahá, and aided in costumes for play at Keene State College.

She died May 1, 1979 and a posthumously published memoir, "The Artist's Daughter: Memoirs 1890–1979" was printed with the aide of her grandchildren.

Regular hosts at Green Acre were Bahiyyih Randall and Harry Ford along with Mildred Mottahedeh in the 1940s. Louis Gregory and Curtis Kelsey led a race unity workshop at Green Acre in August 1940 and there was a focus on religion and science in a series of talks as well as individual talks. During the tenure of Randall and Ford, Randall gathered historical materials both at Green Acre and from the Baháʼí national archives, the fourth floor of the Inn was renovated, and a new separate building, Baha'i Hall, was built.

In 1941 a trusteeship was created for Green Acre for the National Spiritual Assembly of the United States and Canada – its members were Allen McDaniel, Dorothy Baker, Roy Wilhelm, Horace Holley, Siegfried Scholpflocher, Leroy Ioas, Amelia Collings, Louis Gregory, Harlan Ober. The Baháʼís officially announced the new name of the institution as the "Green Acre Baháʼí School". The extended program of events carried on with wide attendance. That year the site also began to host annual race unity conferences – that year having talks by Louis Gregory, Roy Wilkins of the NAACP and The Crisis, Matthew Bullock and Dorothy Baker.

In July 1942 Helen Archambault, William Kenneth and Robert Christian, Harry Ford, Ober and Cobb all gave talks at the summer session of Green Acre, followed by a study class series by William Kenneth, Roberta Christian, and Ober. Paul Haney married Helen Margery Wheeler there in 1942. Shook's talk at Green Acre in July 1942 was profiled in the local paper, and his presentations went on into September along with other events. A number of prominent Baháʼís were in a Green Acre "Race Amity" conference in August 1942 – Dorothy Beecher Baker, Matthew Bollock, Ali Kuli Khan, Mabel Jenkins, Harlan Ober, Lorna Tasker, Louis Gregory, Doris McKay, Hillery Thorne, and Harriet Kelsey were all on the speaker list. Among the other presenters were Phyllis Weatley and James Weldon Johnson. Ober continued at a general session at Green Acre a few days later.

=== 1943 ===
1943 was a year of race riots around the United States – the Beaumont race riot of 1943 of mid-June, the Detroit race riot of 1943 of late June, and the Harlem riot of 1943 of early August. Profiles of the religion's teaching of race unity had been highlighted by Alice Simmons Cox in The New York Age in the winter-spring Dorothy Beecher Baker had a talk series including the subject of race unity in Rochester, NY, in late July just before the Green Acre summer session and Mrs. Charles Witt talk on race unity over in Los Angeles, CA. Ober was one among several present in an August series of talks at Green Acre – Mary Coristine, Philip Sprague, Lorraine Welsh, Lorna Tasker, Mary McClendon, Gertrude Atkinson, Louis Gregory, Horace Holley, Mrs. Florence Breed Khan, Hesmat Ala'i, Maud Mickle, and Mabel Jenkins all contributed on topics of equality of women and unity of humanity, with the largest attendance of the season, partly from a nationwide call for the prominence of the topic, while the late August session also featured a review of the life of Muhammad. The National assembly had set in motion a series of efforts in anticipation of the Centenary of the Declaration of the Báb, saying the situation of race in the country "demands our devoted attention and endeavor throughout September and October, the fundamental teaching of the Faith, its most challenging principle, its swift healing antidote for the ills of a divided world." There was a specific attempt to reach the public, and on the subject of the oneness of mankind – race unity. The conference achieved some newspaper publicity, and there was indeed a breadth of many talks by Baháʼís into November. Among them were Dorothy Beecher Baker, Louis G. Gregory, and Alain Locke.

The next summer, of 1944, had its own crisis. There was a series by managed by Ober and Nancy Bowditch in early July, but pleas came from the National Assembly that Tera Cowart-Smith drop her plans in Atlanta and arrange to be at Green Acre to take over the management of the summer session.^{p. 61–7} She reports great difficulty in deciding to go in the face of having to drop her clients, and in getting there, and many privations figuring out how to feed the guests. Mildred Mottahedeh was there assisting her through the period and 75 guests came. The public news covered her at Green Acre. The race unity meeting had Genevieve Coy, Mildred Mottahedeh, Ober, Gregory, Lydia Martin and Sarah Martin (Pereira), and Matthew Bullock (who himself recalled the bitter disappointment of integrated service in the military and returning home to a segregated society.) The national assembly advertised for managers for Green Acre in November. Ober also gave a later series at the Portsmouth Baháʼí Center late in the year and into spring 1945. Sessions of near one hundred people ran in the 1945 race unity meeting and in 1946 a week long study was done on "The Negro in American Life". Gregory called it "the most wonderful season in its history, save that of 1912 when His Holidness ʻAbdu'l-Bahá Himself taught here."

Winter season classes were begun in 1947 by Emanuel (Manny) and Janet Reimer in their cottage "on campus" which grew to be housed in the main "Fellowship Hall". Though talks were held in June 1949, during the rest of 1949 and 1950 the executive decision was made by then head of the religion Shoghi Effendi to close Green Acre School for two years of "austerity" while the final push to finish the Baháʼí House of Worship was under way. A program for World Religion Day did take place in January 1950 over in Portsmouth with Baháʼí support and others Shook was elected chair of the Eliot assembly in 1950 – the other members were Lucien McComb, Mrs McComb, Thorton Pearsall, Vincent Minutti, Mrs Delbert Cress, Mrs Dudley Blakely, Mrs John Marlow, Emaniel Reimer – and other smaller events took place.

=== 1950s ===
Green Acre Baháʼí School was reopened in 1951 thanks in part to youth groups working on getting the facility ready.

==== Louis G. Gregory ====
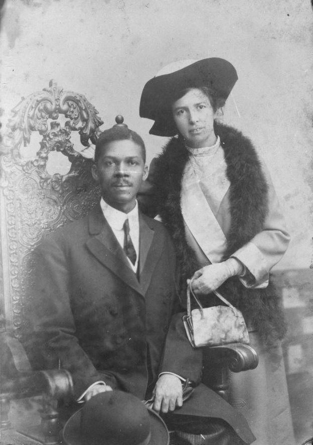
Louis G. and Louisa Mathew Gregory

Louis G. Gregory went to Green Acre in the fall of 1911 for the first time – it was just a few months after his return from Baháʼí pilgrimage. In 1912 he married Louise Matthews. He was next known at Green Acre in 1917 when he gave a talk "Prophetic proofs of the Baha'i Revelation." In 1920 the Gregories were able to spend some ten days together after many months each traveling in different directions for the religion amidst a time where inter-racial marriage was socially troubled and he was "so onerous and irritable, so unlike himself" that his wife was in despair over his condition - nevertheless he set out on the longest of his teaching tours the following year. From then on most summers they were able to be in the environment at Eliot and it became their "home base". In 1922, while a member of the National Spiritual Assembly, he chaired the summer program and gave two talks at Green Acre – "Prayer and Praise", and "The Holy Mariner". They were there in 1923. He attended the organizing 1925 national convention held at Green Acre. The 1926 summer program at Green Acre had Gregory as co-director with Albert Vail and Howard MacNutt. They were there in June 1929 before the Green Acre program started. Like many leaders in the religion, the Gregories began to serve overseas for extended periods in the 1930s – Louise in Europe at first and then the both of them in Haiti. The Gregorys returned to Green Acre in 1938 but wintered in Cambridge.

In 1940 the Gregories bought a different summer cottage in Eliot, and a winter apartment in Portsmouth. A small community held Nineteen Day Feast in September 1941. Gregory served several years on the Green Acre school committee itself in the 1940s and loved to work with children's classes. From 1946, now that Louise was over eighty years old and less independent, Gregory stayed more at home than traveling the country as he had done for decades. Both his race and their inter-racial marriage seemed well accepted in Eliot. Friends often saw them on the porch or at events in Green Acre and their garden was doing well at home.

In December 1948 Gregory suffered a stroke a couple months after returning from a funeral for a friend and between him and his wife, whose health also declined, began to stay closer to home. His recovery was more than the doctor predicted when a couple months later he had regained his hand-writing though slanted. By the summer of 1949 he was again carrying on an active correspondence. In particular Gregory carried on correspondence with U.S. District Court Judge Julius Waties Waring and his wife in 1950–51 who was involved in Briggs v. Elliott even while Green Acre was closed for austerity.

Gregory died aged seventy-seven on July 30, 1951. He is buried at Eliot and just a few days later during the memorial service a telegram arrived stating he was appointed as one of the Hands of the Cause, the highest office open to individuals in the religion, by then head of the religion, Shoghi Effendi.

==== Other activities ====
Ober stayed home in the summer of 1951, and officiated at the funeral of Louis G. Gregory, which was followed up with a series of talks at Green Acre, as well as other opportunities. For a few years the public mentions of Ober are a couple funerals he oversaw, but in 1956 he gave a series of talks.

In 1952 the room ʻAbdu'l-Bahá's used while staying there was set aside for prayers and meditation.

Legal cases began to question the roll of Green Acre as a religious institution and its status for tax reasons. In 1954 the Supreme Judicial Court of Maine ruled that the Green Acre Baháʼí Institute was entitled to tax exemption as a charitable institution. Horace Holley made public some material on the legal timeline of Green Acre in 1955 sharing information affecting its tax status. Nathan Rutstein lived at Green Acre in the summer of 1955 with his new wife before getting into television production and appointed as an Auxiliary Board member for the religion.

=== 1960s - 1990s ===
In the 1960s, the first full-time staff of the school and the first year-round live-in caretaker were hired – Stuart Rhode and Emma Rice. The first full-time property manager, Edwin Miller was hired in the 1970s. Emma Rice, former Knight of Baháʼu'lláh for Sicily, became the resident caretaker of the Fellowship House. The tax status of Green Acre Baha'i Institute was contested in 1963 and the same court removed the tax exemption, based on a 1957 law limiting exemptions to institutions that primarily serve residents of Maine. Richard Grover grew into the first full-time administrator of Green Acre in the 1980s. The administration of Green Acre transferred to Ray Labelle around 1990 and then James and Jeannine Sacco in 1995–96. Later, in 1997, the US Supreme Court declared the Maine law unconstitutional reverting the tax status of Green Acre. Green Acre became recognized as "paradigmatic of a Baháʼí institution".

A variety of individuals visited in the 1960 and into the 1970s in addition to regular presenters. The 1960 session included Firuz Kazemzadeh. A Pennacook Indian, Gerard Morin aka Little Bishop, presented on local Indian culture in Green Acre in 1966. Hand of the Cause Ali Akbar Furutan visited in 1969. Hand of the Cause William Sears visited in 1978 with his wife Marguerite Reimer Sears as part of establishing the Reimer award for service to Green Acre. Its first recipient was Emma Rice.

It was also during the 1960s that the first Baháʼí studies of the history of Sarah Farmer, Green Acre, and Monsalvat took place by Douglas Martin and H.T.D. Rost. This was extended in the 1980s with occasional lectures entitled Farmer Family Memorial Lectures began, while Kenneth Walter published a polemical compilation of the rise and fall of transcendentalism at Green Acre in 1980 recalling the vehemence against the Baháʼís. The Association for Baháʼí Studies held its first regional conference at Green Acre in 1983. Sessions began to be held preserving Green Acre history and in 1986 the National Spiritual Assembly made the restoration of the Sarah Farmer Inn a goal for the Baháʼís of the Northeast. In 1989 local chapters of peace groups offered programs at Green Acre, and centennial observances began starting with its inception in 1890. Restoration of the Sarah Farmer Inn continued for many years as funds became available and was finally completed in summer of 1994, the centennial of the first Greenacre Meeting entitled "100 Years for Peace" commemorated with a post office cancelation and some 1500 guests (greater than the population of the town of Eliot when the site opened.) Some 300 attended program of the Vedanta Society to commemorate Swami Vivekenda's presence in 1894 with a plaque along with publishing a collection of poetry, Voice of Lovers. Baháʼí academies and training sessions by the Baháʼí International Community office at the United Nations were held in the 1990s.

In 1998 the institution of the "Black Men's gathering" began annual meetings at Green Acre Baháʼí School after being hosted at Louis Gregory Baháʼí Institute and other places until it ended in 2011. Each year the group walked in procession to Gregory's gravesite. Green Acre Baháʼí School has also been home to the annual "Turning 15 Academy"/"Badasht Prep Academy"/"Badasht Academy" (variously named and often named after the Conference of Badasht) since the summer of 1999 as a week-long intensive study of Baháʼí history and religious practices.

=== Since 2000 ===
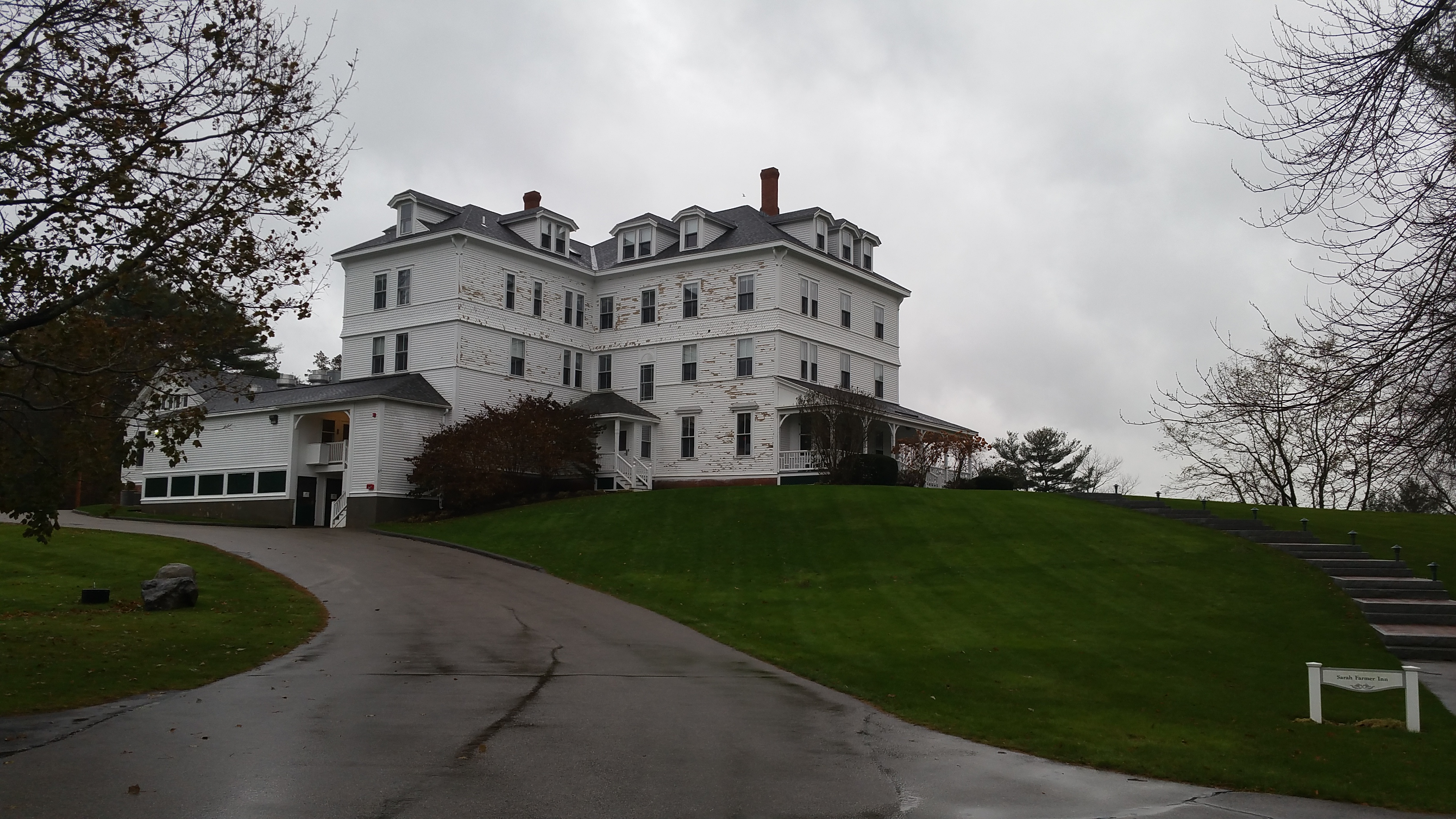
Sarah Farmer Inn at Green Acre, November 2017

In 2000 Ruhi Institute courses were offered. Observances memorializing the deaths in 9-11 were held in cooperation with the Eliot public library and the local congregational church. In 2002 the old Baha'i Hall was taken down and replaced the same year with the Curtis and Harriet Kelsey Center which featured an auditorium for 220 seats and seven classrooms. Noted scholar on Khalil Gibran, Suheil Bushrui spoke at Green Acre Baháʼí school in 2003 giving a two-day course on ʻAbdu'l-Bahá's teachings on peace. Renovations and expansion at Green Acre as part of an investment across all the Baháʼí schools was initiated in 2000 under the name "Kingdom Project" and finished in 2005.

In 2004 a commemorative peace garden was established at the School and the property of the home of the Gregory's was added to the holdings of Green Acre Baháʼí School in Eliot.

In 2005 the centenary of the Portsmouth Peace Treaty and Farmer's involvement was established in a Sarah Farmer Peace Award by the Baháʼís of Eliot and has been given out annually and Ryozo Kato, Japanese Ambassador to the United States in 2005, made an official visit to Green Acre commemorating the treaty. The events were held included re-enactments for Theodore Roosevelt, Ida B. Wells, Thomas Edison, William Jennings Bryan, and Fred Harvey as well as Sarah Farmer herself, along with contributions from speakers, writers and artists were held at Green Acre Baháʼí School itself as well as a meeting of the Association of Baháʼí Studies of the US and Canada.

The School also continued to network with the area chapter of the NAACP.

In 2007 sessions included the sitting Chair for Peace from the University of Maryland, Dr. John Grayzel, gave a class with the chair of the Portsmouth Peace Treaty Anniversary Committee.

The Eliot 2010 bicentenary was celebrated and there was a play at Green Acre as part of it. Green Acre was also reviewed in line with other movements of the turn of the 20th century in a documentary about peace activism related to the Treaty of Portsmouth and was premiered on the campus in 2012 during the centenary of ʻAbdu'l-Bahá's visit. Four more buildings were dedicated after a four-year construction project: the Harry Randall Guest House, Louise and Louisa Gregory Cottage, Mildred and Rafi Mottahedeh Cottage, and Emma Rice Cottage replacing four of the older cottages on the property. In Washington D. C. a commemorative tour recalled Stanwood Cobb's association with Green Acre and Eliot.

Don Tennant appreciated living in the atmosphere of honesty at Green Acre while he wrote Spy the lie, published in 2012, while his wife worked at Green Acre.
