= Religion in Barbados =

Religion in Barbados is predominantly Christian. Religious freedom is established by law and generally enforced in practice, although some minority religious groups have complaints about government practices that interfere with their beliefs.

Religious affiliation in Barbados (2022 est.)
1. Protestant (total) (66.4%)
2. Roman Catholic (3.80%)
3. Other Christian (5.40%)
4. Rastafarian (1.00%)
5. Other religions (1.50%)
6. None (20.6%)
7. Unspecified (1.20%)

Nearly half of the population in Barbados is non-religious or otherwise does not identify with any religious institution, with 45.5% of the population (62,000 people out of 136,365) reporting no religion in the 2021 Barbados census.

== History ==
According to Historian Larry Gragg (Missouri University of Science and Technology - 2009), the Quakers community was first concentrated in and around Barbados before moving en masse Pennsylvania. The island was the first stop for slave ships coming from Africa, and the Quakers developed a balanced social environment "to challenge the practices of the planter class". In a 1860 census, 500 of the 20,000 white people in Barbados were Quakers. However, by the end of the 18th century, the Quakers culture had vanished, partly due to the persecution of the Church of England.

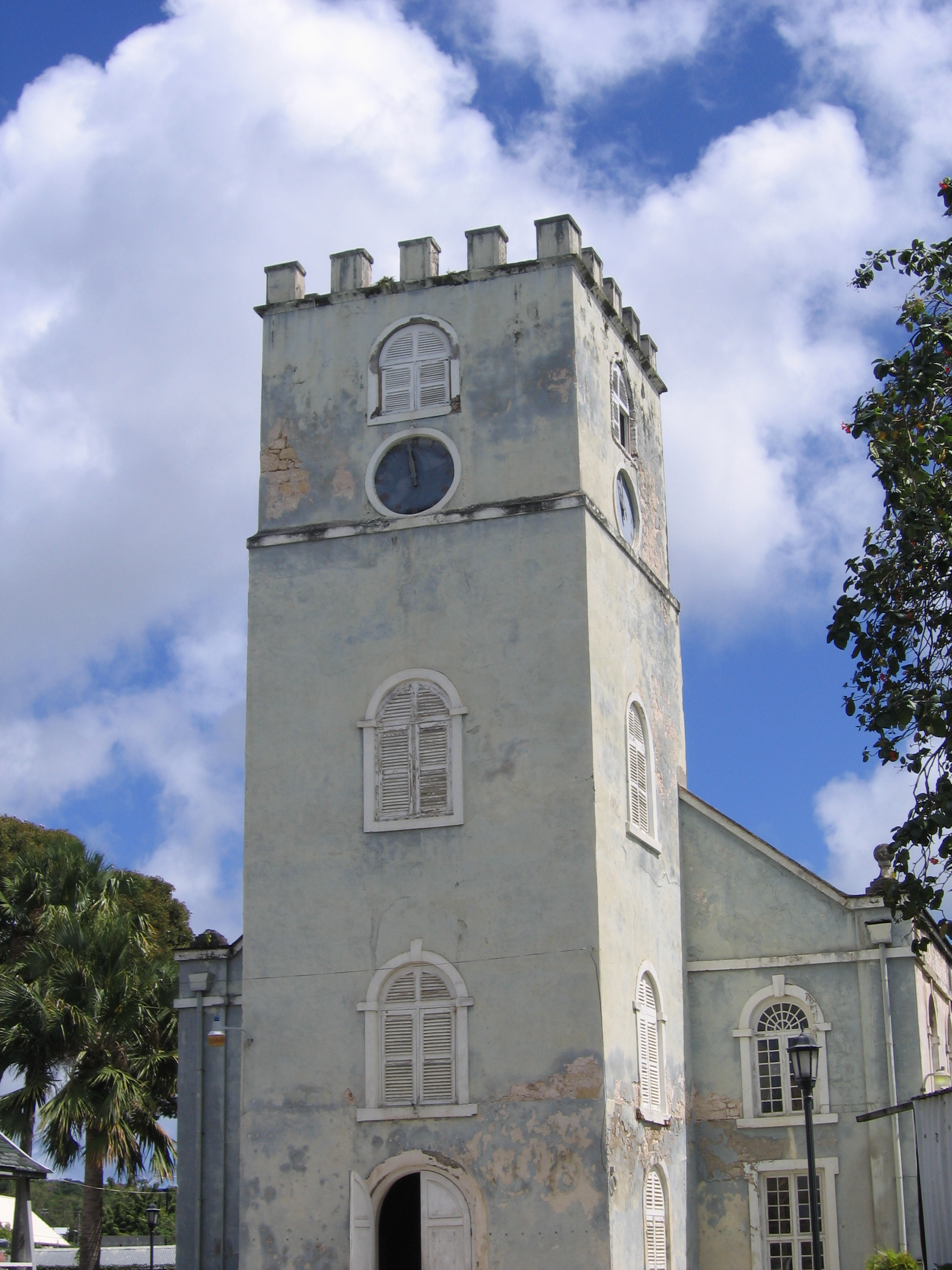
St. Peter's Parish Church, Saint Peter, Barbados

== Religious affiliations 1970, 2010 and 2022 ==
The reference work Religions of the World provides the following data for Barbados:

Religion	Followers in 1970	Followers in 2010	% of Population 2010	% of population in 2022
Christians	235,000	284,000	95.5%	75.6%
Protestants	50,600	100,000	33.7%	66.4%
Anglicans	90,000	85,600	28.8%	23.9%
Pentecostal				19.5%
Adventist				5.9%
Methodist				4.2%
Wesleyan				3.4%
Nazarene				3.2%
Church of God				2.4%
Baptist				1.8%
Moravian				1.2%
other Protestant				0.9%
Roman Catholic				3.8%
Jehovah's Witness				2%
other Christian				3,4%
Rastafarian				1%
None				20.6%
Others	8,900	16,000	32.1%	1.5%
unspecified				1.2%
Agnostics	2,400	5,100	1.7%	
Bahá’ís	1,300	3,600	1.2%	
Muslims	400	2,300	0.8%	
Hindus	100	980	0.3%	
Atheists	0	700	0.2%	
New religionists	50	480	0.2%	
Buddhists	0	120	0.0%	
Spiritists	0	60	0.0%	
Jews	30	40	0.0%	
Ethnoreligionists	0	30	0.0%	
Total Population	239,000	297,000	100.0%	100.0%

Although Catholics are missing from the above chart, the same reference book gives their percentage as 4 percent in 1980 and 4.2 percent in 2000.

=== Rastafarianism ===
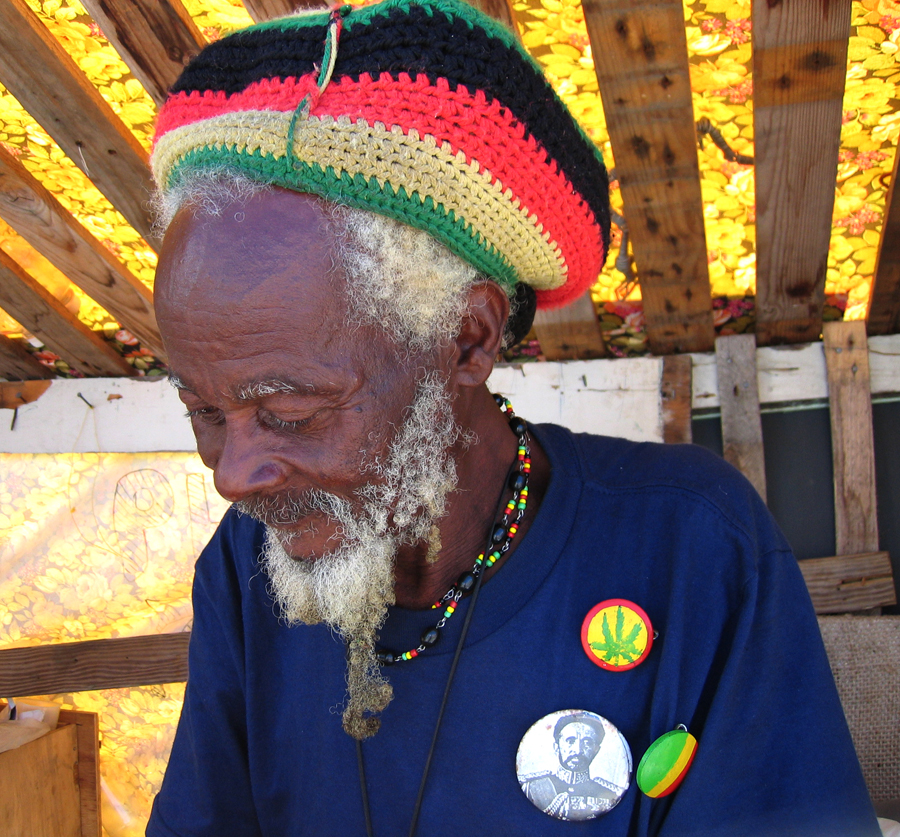
A Rasta in Barbados, wearing a rastacap decorated in the Rastafari colours: green, gold, red and black

The Rastafarian Movement was introduced to Barbados in 1975, influenced by its Jamaican origins and the teachings of Marcus Garvey. As of 2010, Rastafarians represented about 1% of the national population, or roughly 3,000 people.

In 2019, the government legalized the religious use of cannabis for Rastafarians and granted 60 acres (24 ha) of land for cultivation. Some community leaders have criticized the Sacramental Cannabis Act for limiting its use to places of worship and requiring permits for consumption elsewhere.

In April 2025, the University of the West Indies at Cave Hill hosted a panel marking the 50th anniversary of the Rastafari Nyabinghi Tabernacle in Mount Carmel, St. John, recognizing its role in preserving Rastafarian culture in Barbados.

== Religious freedom ==
The constitution of Barbados provides for the freedom of religion and prohibits discrimination based on creed; there is a law against "blasphemous libel" but it is unenforced.

Religious groups are allowed to establish private schools and provide religious instruction, with some support from the government; education in Christian values is taught in primary schools, with several religions being taught at secondary level (students may opt out).

The local community launched the bi-weekly publication The Rastafari Vision (TRV) in 2021. Representatives of the Rastafari community have objected to mandatory vaccinations for schoolchildren.

== See also ==
- Anglican Church of Barbados
- Bahá'í Faith in Barbados
- Barbadian Jews
- Catholic Church in Barbados
- Hinduism in Barbados
- Islam in Barbados
- Methodism in Barbados
