= Rosemary Cottage =

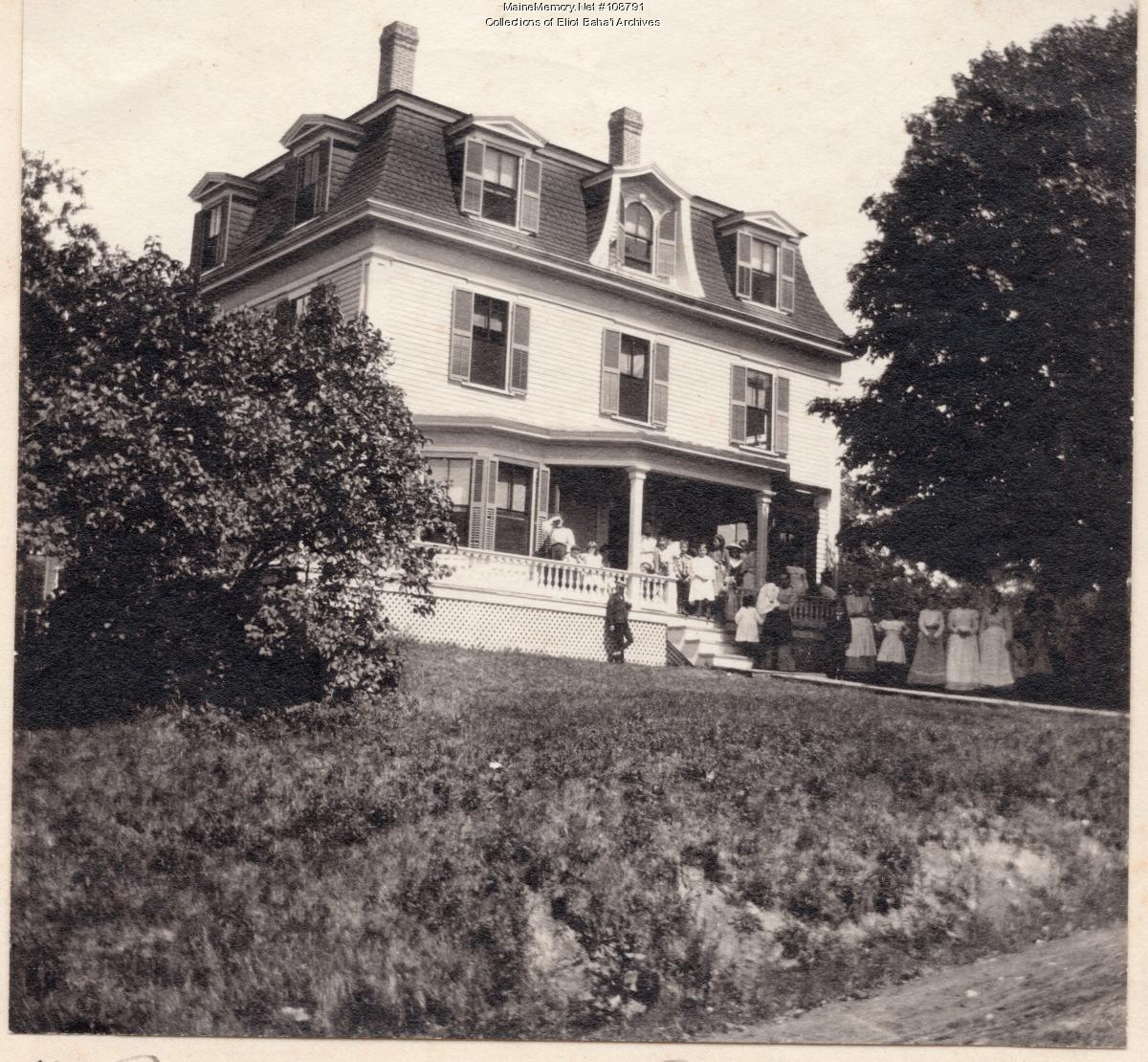
ca. 1888

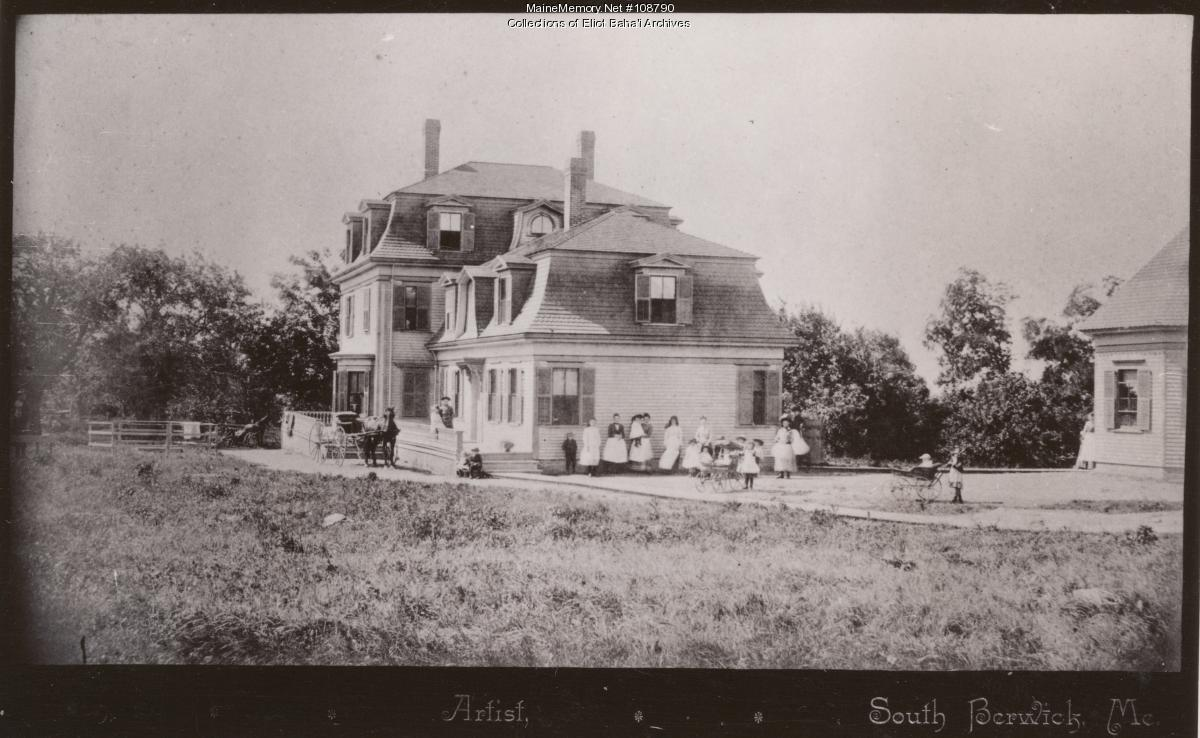
ca. 1888

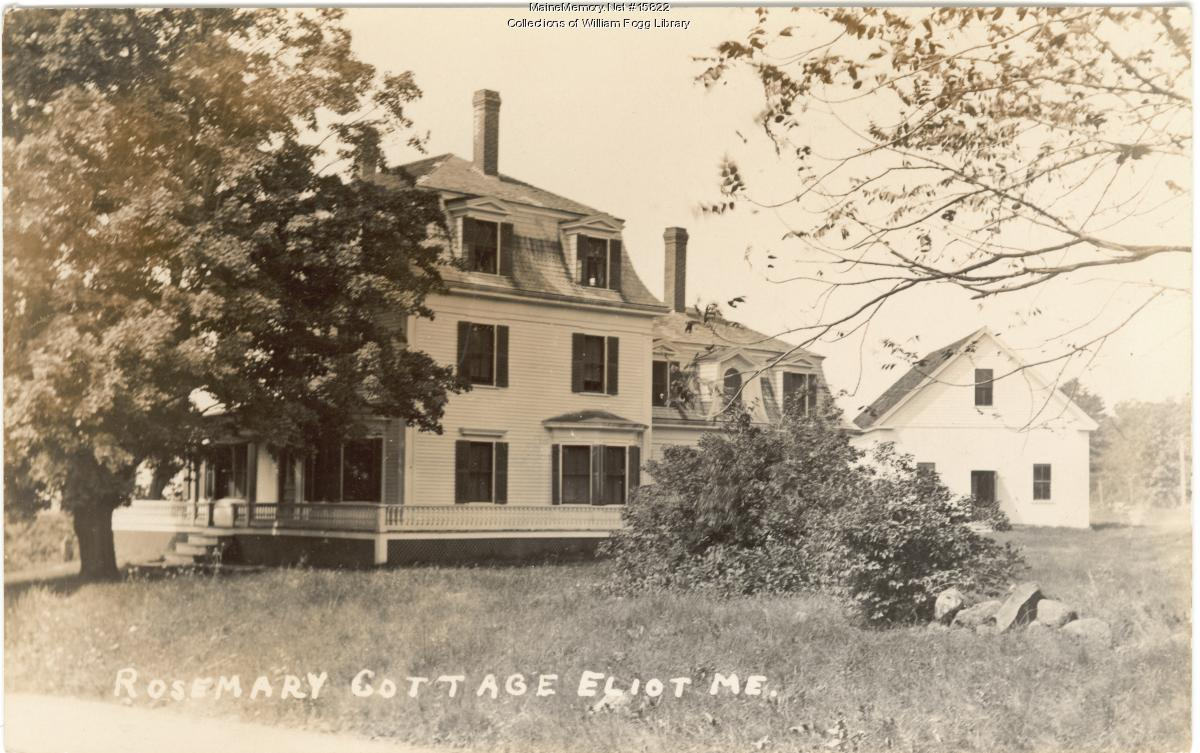
ca. 1900

Rosemary Cottage was an American charity and summer retreat in Eliot, Maine. It was built by Hannah Tobey Farmer in memory of her dead child. The camp was available for children and mothers from the congested districts in Boston.

== Location ==
A large, airy house, located halfway up an eminence known as Frost Hill, in Eliot, Maine. The house commanded a beautiful view, and featured the fresh air of Maine's woods and pastures, along with apple blossoms and lilacs.

The grounds included approximately 12 acres (4.9 ha).

The winding road was lined with nut trees, and a grove of them was farther down the hill. On one side stood an old willow and white-stemmed birches. Far away to the westward, stretched the undulating country with the Piscataqua River winding through it.

== History ==
The cottage was named after a line spoken by Ophelia in William Shakespeare's Hamlet, "Here's rosemary-that's for remembrance", in honor of Farmer's dead child.

Guests came in remained a fortnight. The families were sent to Rosemary Cottage for vacation privileges by the various Congregational churches of Greater Boston.

It was made available for children and their mothers who otherwise would have to spend hot months in the crowded, narrow streets of Boston or some other city along the Boston and Maine Railroad. Once a fortnight, through June, July, August, and a part of September, on Monday, groups of children arrived with their mothers, via the Boston and Maine Railroad train. In addition to mothers with their children, an elderly woman also spent time at Rosemary Cottage.

The cottage was given to the City Mission Society of Boston, and was carried on by its Fresh Air Fund, a recognized institution in Boston. It promoted by Rev. D. W. Waldron who made appeals for contributions to it. The vacationers were selected and sent there by Waldron, as he and his associates knew many people in Boston, and they were apt to know who would benefit from time spent in such a home.

By 1908, 10,316 mothers and children had participated in the program.

In 1919, Rosemary Cottage was under the leadership of Mary Anderson of Park Street Church. The cook was the head of the English Department in a large city high school. The workers all served from the missionary motive.

== Architecture and fittings ==
The cottage had twenty rooms, with accommodation for forty-eight guests. Sleeping-rooms had small white beds. It was decorated nicely, many of the rooms having been furnished by clubs or private generosity. The parlor had pictures, books, and ornaments, as well as the Wadsworth Mottoes, given by the King's Daughters of Eliot: "Look up and not down. Look forward and not back. Look out and not in. Lend a hand." The "Helping Hand Society" of Ipswich, Massachusetts made picture books of cards. Pails and shovels were on hand for digging dirt.
