= City Mission Society =

The City Mission Society was a social justice agency founded in 1816 by the congregations of Old South Church and Park Street Church with a mission to serve the urban poor of metropolitan Boston, Massachusetts. In 2023 it decided to close: the final service was celebrated at Old South Church which received its assets and will continue some of its programs. The archives were moved to the Congregational Library in Boston.

City Mission Society had been a party to the establishment of programs serving children and families, and has helped to found several now independent schools and social service agencies. Rosemary Cottage was one of its operations.
