= Sarah Jane Farmer =

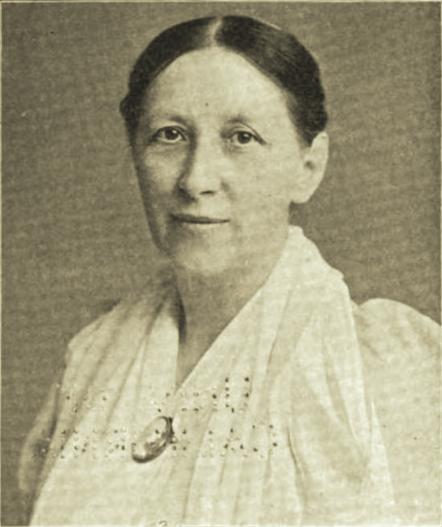
- (1899)
- Born: July 22, 1847; Dover, New Hampshire, U.S.
- Died: November 23, 1916 (aged 69); Eliot, Maine, U.S.
- Known for: Founder, Greenacre Conferences (1894); Founder, Monsalvat School of Comparative Study of Religion (1896)
- Parents: Moses G. Farmer (father); Hannah Tobey Farmer (mother)

Sarah Jane Farmer (1847-1916) founded the Greenacre Conferences in Eliot, Maine, U.S. After her death, Greenacre became the Green Acre Baháʼí School.

== Early life and education ==
Sarah Jane Farmer was born in Dover, New Hampshire, on July 22, 1847, the only child of Professor Moses G. Farmer and Hannah Tobey (Shapleigh) Farmer. Her New England family practiced Unitarianism.

She graduated from Salem, Massachusetts High School, in 1868, followed by instruction by private tutors, 1868-81. She lived in Cambridge, Massachusetts, and Newport, Rhode Island, in young adulthood.

== Career ==
Having moved to Eliot, Maine, with her parents in 1887, she worked on establishing a public library in that city.

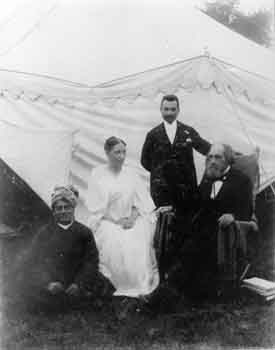
Farmer with Swami Vivekananda (Green Acre, 1894)

After attending the Parliament of the World's Religions in Chicago in 1893 with her father, Farmer decided to establish Greenacre, with the support of her acquaintances in the New Thought, women's clubs, and women's suffrage movements, as well as several Ralph Waldo Emerson societies. In 1894, she founded Greenacre Conferences at Eliot, Maine, which resembled a Chautauqua. Two annual schools anchored the Greenacre Conferences: the Monsalvat School of Comparative Study of Religion (established by Farmer in 1896) and the (revived) Concord School of Philosophy. In addition, the Greenacre Conferences offered lectures by instructors in various fields. These afforded annual assemblies for lectures by leaders of advanced thought, American, European, and Oriental.

The Greenacre Colony attracted wide attention because of its free discussion of religious subjects. Many members of the clergy and writers identified with it. It was almost disrupted, however, by factional differences.

Farmer engaged in European travel in 1886, 1893, 1900. It was during her trip in 1900 that she met ʻAbdu'l-Bahá and became a member of the Bahá’í faith.

== Later life ==
Sarah Farmer made her home at Greenacre. In 1910, she was declared insane and sent to an asylum. Subsequently, her mental condition became the subject of litigation. She died at the family homestead in Eliot, Maine, on November 23, 1916.

== Selected works ==
- Dresser, Horatio Willis, ed. (1917). Chapter 2 - The Spirit of the New Thought, by Sarah J. Farmer. New York: Thomas Y. Crowell Company. pp. 29–36.
