= Moses G. Farmer =

American electrical engineer and inventor (1820–1893)

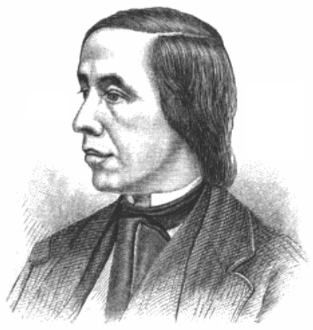
- Born: February 9, 1820; Boscawen, New Hampshire, U.S.
- Died: May 25, 1893 (aged 73); Chicago, Illinois, U.S.
- Occupation(s): Electrical engineer, inventor
- Spouse: Hannah Tobey Shapleigh (m. 1844)
- Children: Sarah Jane Farmer

Moses Gerrish Farmer (February 9, 1820 – May 25, 1893) was an American electrical engineer and inventor. Farmer was a member of the AIEE, later known as the IEEE.

== Biography ==
Farmer was born at Boscawen, New Hampshire. He received his schooling at Phillips Academy and Dartmouth College. He spent his early adult years in Eliot, Maine and Cambridge, Massachusetts. He was a pioneer telegraph operator. He constructed and maintained the telegraph lines of Massachusetts. He later became a superintendent of a telegraph company. Farmer investigated multiple telegraphy. He successfully demonstrated duplex telegraphy between New York and Philadelphia in 1856. Farmer also investigated telluric currents.

In 1847, Farmer constructed and exhibited in public what he called "an electro-magnetic locomotive, and with forty-eight pint cup cells of Grove nitric acid battery drew a little car carrying two passengers on a track a foot and a half wide". Farmer later fabricated a process for electroplating aluminum. At Boston in 1851, he constructed an electric fire-alarm service with William Francis Channing. He invented several forms of incandescent electric light.

Farmer, in competition with Søren Hjorth (1854), Ányos Jedlik (1856), Charles Wheatstone (1867); Carl Wilhelm Siemens; Ernst Werner von Siemens; and Carl Heinrich von Siemens (1867); Ladd (1867); and Zénobe Gramme (1871), co-conceived the self-exciting dynamo in 1859, and constructed one in 1860. He built a platinum filament incandescent light in 1859. At the age of 39 while living in Salem, Massachusetts, he lit the parlor of his home at 11 Pearl St with incandescent lamps, the first house in the world to be lit by electricity. He was a co-inventor of the self-exciting dynamo, an electric generator using electromagnets for the field which are energized by the generator output, in 1866. In 1868, with the Farmer dynamo, Farmer lit a house in Massachusetts. He also patented an early lightbulb (which was later bought by Thomas Edison).

With his partner William Wallace, he invented the early dynamo which powered a system of arc lights he exhibited at the Centennial Exhibition of 1876 in Philadelphia, and which inspired Thomas Edison to work on an improved incandescent light. Edison used the Wallace-Farmer 8 horsepower (6.0 kW) dynamo to power his early electric light demonstrations. Farmer served as a teacher for a time. Farmer died at the World's Columbian Exposition. Farmer was a pioneer of many aspects of 19th century electrical invention, but, because he and his wife were spiritualists, they felt that their talents were God-given, and he felt that they shouldn't take credit for any of his inventions. As a result, he failed to carry his ideas to commercial success.

He died in Chicago on May 25, 1893.

== Bibliography ==
- Conot, Robert (1979). A Streak of Luck. New York: Seaview Books. ISBN 0-87223-521-1.
- Derry, T.K.; Williams, Trevor I. (1961). A Short History of Technology. New York: Oxford University Press. ISBN 9780198812319.
- Jonnes, Jill (2003). Empires of Light. New York: Random House. ISBN 0-375-50739-6.
- Josephson, Matthew (2003). Edison; a biography. Francis Parkman Prize Edition History Book Club. ISBN 0-9655699-3-4.
