= Hannah Tobey Farmer =

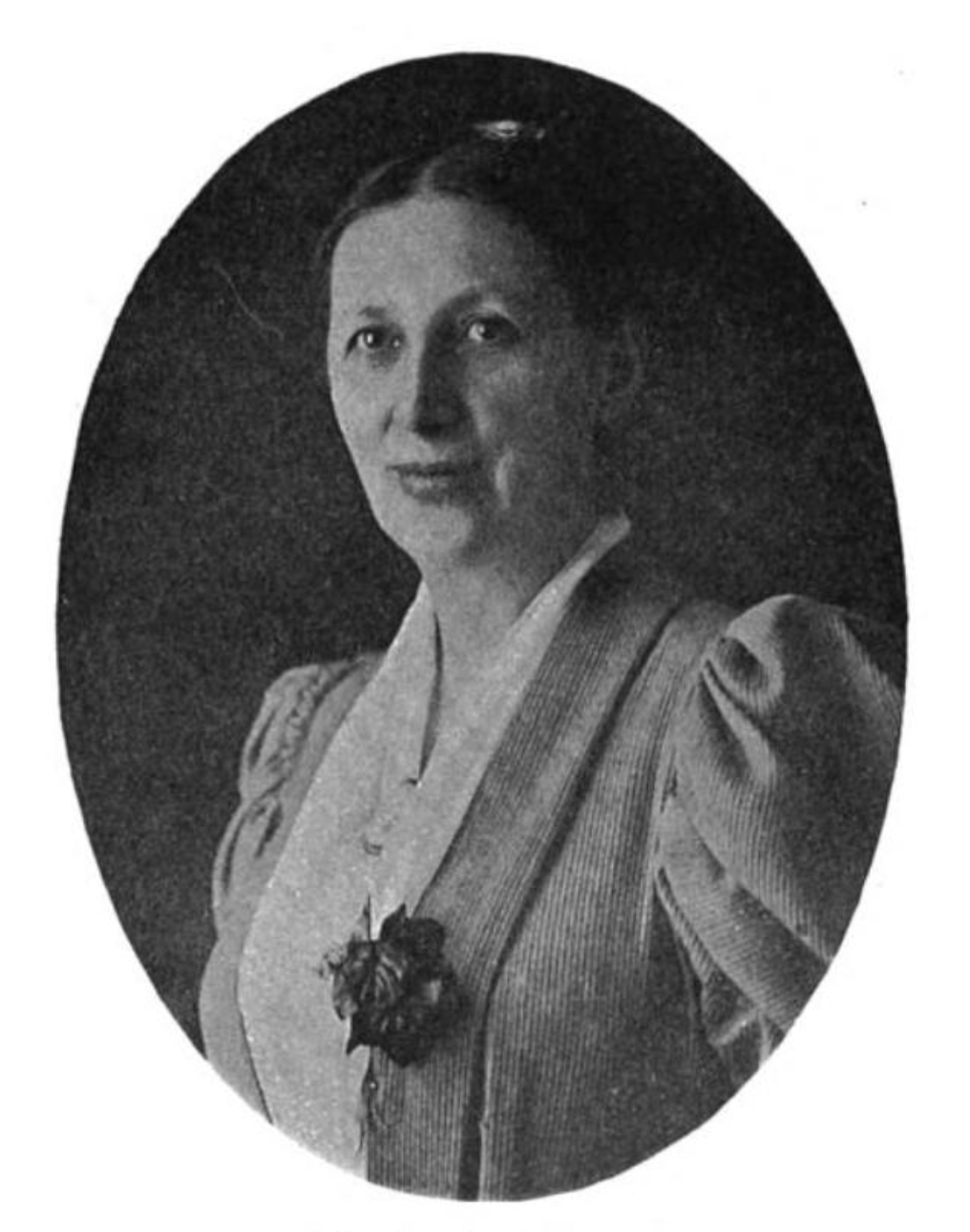
- (undated)
- Born: Hannah Tobey Shapleigh; March 20, 1823; Berwick, Maine, U.S.
- Died: June 27, 1891 (aged 68); Eliot, Maine, U.S.
- Other names: (Mrs.) M. G. Farmer; Mabelle
- Occupations: Philanthropist; social reformer; writer
- Known for: Rosemary Cottage
- Spouse: Moses G. Farmer (m. 1844)
- Children: 2, including Sarah Jane Farmer

Hannah Tobey Farmer (née, Shapleigh; pen names, (Mrs.) M. G. Farmer or Mabelle; 1823-1891) was a 19th-century American philanthropist, writer, and social reformer affiliated with the abolition and women's rights movements. Born in Maine, she became an active supporter of antislavery efforts, and her home in New Hampshire served as a way station on the Underground Railroad. During the Civil War, she organized charitable events and relief efforts for Union soldiers, raising significant funds and supplies. Writing under the pen names "(Mrs.) M. G. Farmer" and "Mabelle", she contributed prose and poetry to the press, often in support of philanthropic causes. Later in life, she established Rosemary Cottage in Eliot, Maine, as a summer retreat for mothers, children, and working women, reflecting her ongoing commitment to social welfare.

== Early life ==
Hannah Tobey Shapleigh was born in Berwick, Maine, on March 20, 1823. Her parents were Richard and Olive (Tobey) Shapleigh. Hannah's siblings included sisters Mary and Elizabeth.

== Career ==
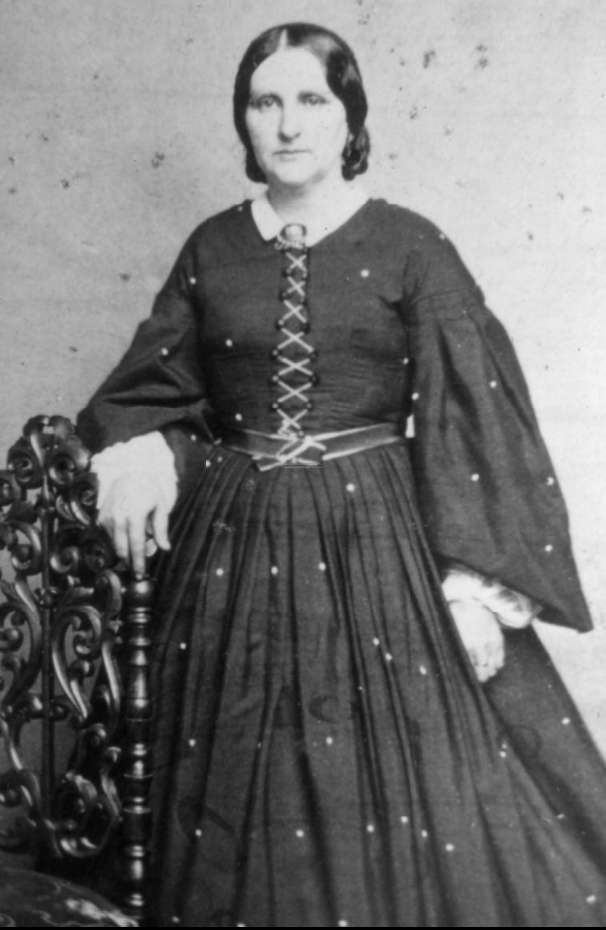
Farmer, ca. 1880

She married Moses Gerrish Farmer on December 25, 1844. She materially assisted him in the development of many important discoveries and inventions.

A few days after her marriage, Mrs. Farmer identified herself with the American Anti-Slavery Society. Her home at Dover, New Hampshire, soon became a way station of the Underground Railroad.

Upon the breaking out of the Civil War and during its continuance, she originated and conducted a series of entertainments for the benefit of the soldiers, which produced large sums of money and supplies. The treasurer of the United States Christian Commission afterward distributed these. Farmer identified herself with every movement to improve the life of Union Army soldiers. At the May Day Fair, which she inaugurated and superintended from her sick bed at home in Salem, Massachusetts, she placed US$1,200 at the committee's disposal for the soldiers' relief. Other fairs followed. She continued her work to the close of the war, writing many letters to the sick in hospitals. Early on, when she learned that regiments from Maine were to pass through Salem, she sent children with flowers and kindly messages to distribute to the soldiers as the train waited at the crossing.

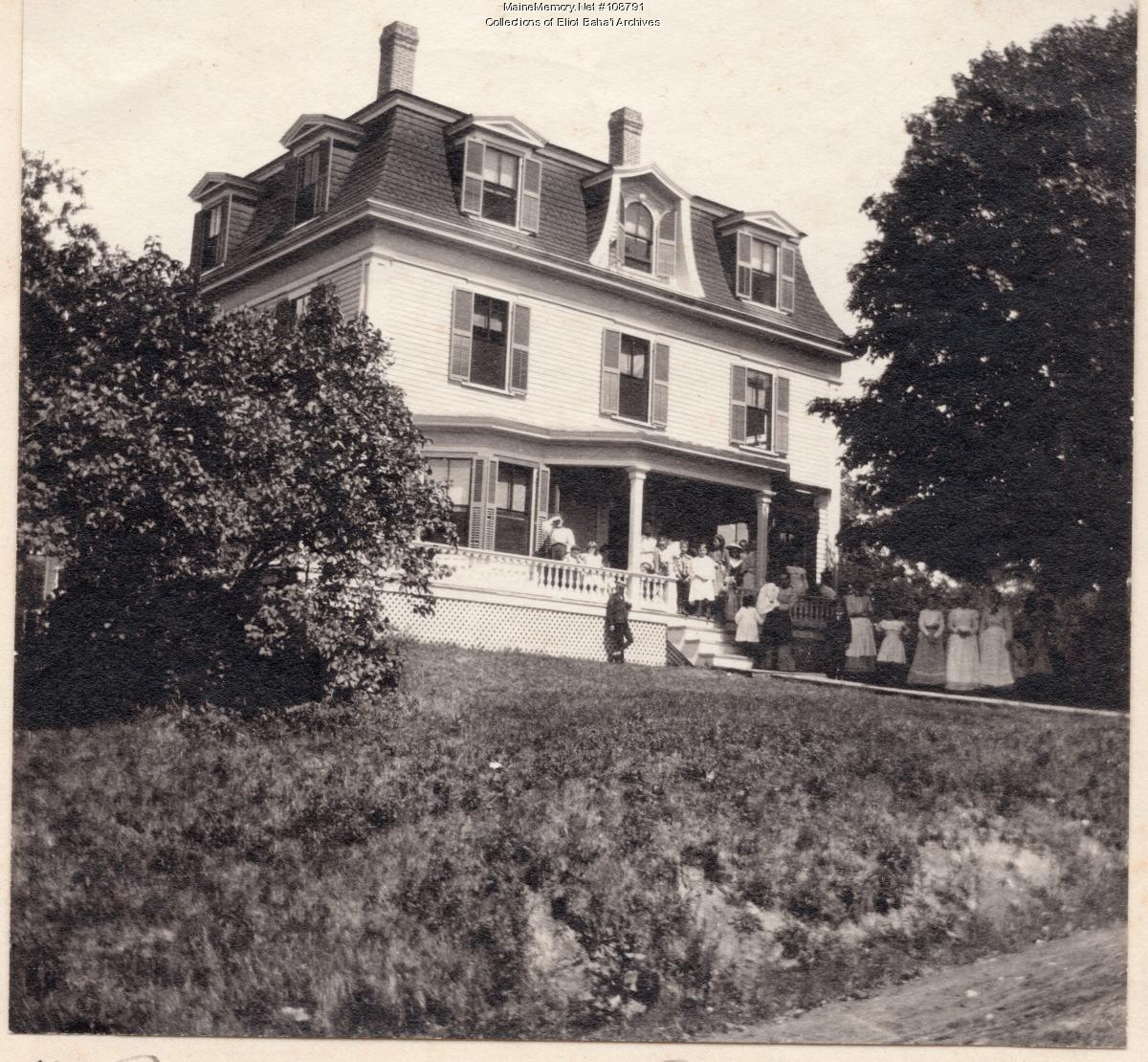
Rosemary Cottage (ca. 1888)

In 1888, in Eliot, Maine, she erected a large building to the memory of an infant son, Edwin Clarence Farmer (1860-1860). Rosemary Cottage afforded summer respite to mothers and children. She transferred this institution to the care of the City Missionary Society of Boston. In 1891, the records of Rosemary Cottage indicated that more than 1,000 guests -mothers, young children, shop girls, and tired women- had received two weeks of rest and shelter.

The rich legacy (1892)

Farmer contributed prose and poetry to the general press, writing largely for the advancement of various philanthropic movements. As a social reformer, she affiliated with the abolition and women's rights movements.

== Personal life ==
The couple had two children, Edwin Clarence Farmer and Sarah Jane Farmer.

== Death and legacy ==
Hannah Tobey Farmer died in Eliot, Maine, on June 27, 1891.

The Rich Legacy: Memories of Hannah Tobey Farmer, Wife of Moses Gerrish Farmer was published by Augustine Caldwell in 1892 (Boston, G.H. Ellis, 1892).
