= Monsalvat School =

Monsalvat School of Comparative Religion (sometimes spelled Montsalvat; meaning "Mount of Peace") was an American constituent school of Sarah Jane Farmer's Greenacre Conferences. The school was established in 1896 in Eliot, Maine, and sustained by voluntary contributions.

== Early history ==
The Free Religious Association of America was founded as a non-sectarian organization devoted to the scientific study of religions. Its work, however, was limited, and the first great popular movement in the direction aimed at by its founders was seen in the World Parliament of Religions in Chicago in connection with the World's Columbian Exposition of 1893. All the leaders in this work retained their interest and conviction of its far-reaching importance.

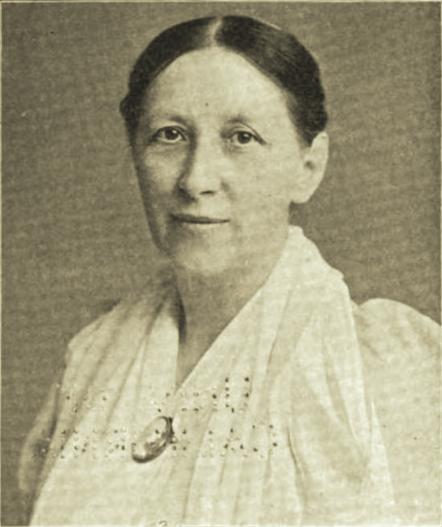
Sarah Jane Farmer (1899)

Sarah J. Farmer was the founder of the Greenacre lectures. As a result of observing the inspiring effects of the 1893 Parliament of Religions and her own experience with teachers of Eastern religions, she made an offer in 1895 to Lewis G. Janes (1844-1901) to establish a school at Greenacre for the comparative study of religions. For many years, Janes had served as president of the Brooklyn Ethical Association.

== Establishment ==
The first session of the Monsalvat School was held in the summer of 1896. A month was devoted to this work each successive season, with steadily increasing interest and attendance. In 1898, the number of students registered was 122. Representatives of the Hindu, Buddhist, Jain, Parsee, Jewish, and Islamic faiths participated from year to year in the work of the Monsalvat School. Scholarly lectures were delivered on various doctrines.

The aim of the work was constructive, with an opportunity for discussion and friendly criticism after each lecture. No propaganda of any particular doctrine was permitted. Each student was expected to exercise their judgment freely on the topics and form their own unbiased conclusions. Among the students each year were several clergy of different denominations. It was especially desired to extend the work in this direction, and to offer its opportunities to divinity students and others who were preparing for ethical or religious teaching. The courses were invaluable to those who aimed to become missionaries, whatever their religious convictions, for no missionary worker could be fully qualified for their duties without a sympathetic knowledge of other faiths.

The Monsalvat School emphasized the search for ideal truth, considering it to be more vital and helpful to life than the propaganda of any special doctrine. The motto of this sentiment, from Herbert Spencer's "First Principles," was printed in the school's prospectus:—

"In proportion as we love truth more and victory less, we shall become anxious to know what it is that leads our opponents to think as they do. We shall begin to suspect that the pertinacity of belief exhibited by them must result from a perception of something which we have not perceived. And we shall aim to supplement the portion of truth we have found zwith the portion found by them.”

== Notable people ==
Among the speakers who constituted the faculty of the School from year to year, besides the director, were:

- Professor Nathaniel Schmidt, chair of Semitic Languages and Literature in Cornell University
- Professor Ismar J. Peritz, of Syracuse University
- the Swami Saradananda and the Swami Abhedananda, of India, representing the Vedanta philosophy and Hindu religion
- the Anagarika Dharmapala, of Ceylon (Parsis)
- Jehanghier Dossabhoy Cola, of Bombay, India, representing the Zoroastrian (or Parsee) faith
- Rev. F. Huberty James, of England, for 16 years a missionary in China and scholar in Chinese literature
- Virchand Gandhi, B.A., M.R.A.S., of Bombay, India, the representative of the Jain communities in the Parliament of Religions
- Jean du Buy, Ph.D., of Berlin, whose course on the ethical and spiritual teachings of the New Testament was subsequently published
- Ruth Gibson, of Medford, Massachusetts, who expounded the philosophy of Emanuel Swedenborg
- Rabbi Joseph Silverman, of Temple Emanu-El, New York City, who lectured on the Talmud
- Emin Leo Nabokoff, a representative of Mohammedan faith
- T. B. (Thomas Boologa) Pandian, of Madras, India, who spoke on social conditions and missionary work in that country
- Shehadi Abd-Allah Shehadi, of Syria, whose topic was the religious and social customs of the Syrians and Bedouin Arabs
- Charles Malloy, President of the Emerson Literary Society of Boston, who spoke on Emerson's indebtedness to Oriental thought
