= Lua Getsinger =

American Baháʼí Faith member (1871–1916)

- Born: November 1, 1871; Hume, New York, US
- Died: May 2, 1916 (aged 44); Cairo, Egypt
- Other names: Louise/Lulu/Lucinda Aurora Moore, Mrs. Edward C. Getsinger
- Occupation: Speaker
- Known for: Disciple of ʻAbdu'l-Bahá
- Title: "Banner", “Herald of the Covenant” and "Mother of the believers"
- Spouse: Edward Getsinger

Louise Aurora Getsinger (1 November 1871 – 2 May 1916), known as Lua, was one of the first Western members of the Baháʼí Faith, recognized as joining the religion on May 21, 1897, just two years after Thornton Chase.

Born into the rural countryside of western New York state and initially with a heterodox understanding of the teachings of the religion, by her fervor she corrected many understandings and grew to become a prominent disciple of ʻAbdu'l-Bahá with an international reputation, being named “Herald of the Covenant” and "Mother of the believers" by ʻAbdu'l-Bahá, head of the religion 1892-1921, and “mother teacher of the American Bahá‘í Community, herald of the dawn of the Day of the Covenant" by Shoghi Effendi in 1942, head of the religion 1921–1957. Nevertheless, she faced trials of reputation among the Bahá'ís in America during a time when rumors arose if a woman traveled with a man other than her husband, which she did in promotional tours across America, into Canada and Mexico. Her husband grew doubtful, their relationship changed, and he sought a divorce. She was defended by the leadership of the religion and her reputation increased after her sudden death in Egypt.

A number of later leaders of the religion were directly affected by her, including members of the high office of the religion, the Hands of the Cause, Louis George Gregory, and John Henry Hyde Dunn, as well as May Maxwell, another prominent woman of the religion and mother of another Hand of the Cause Rúhíyyih Khánum, who had her own direct effect on Agnes Alexander, William Sutherland Maxwell, and Mason Remey and thus had an effect on the promulgation of the religion in America, (including across the color line,) England, France, Canada, India, Australia, New Zealand, and Argentina, in addition to her own direct contact with thousands of people before the end of the first World War.

== Biography ==
=== Early life ===
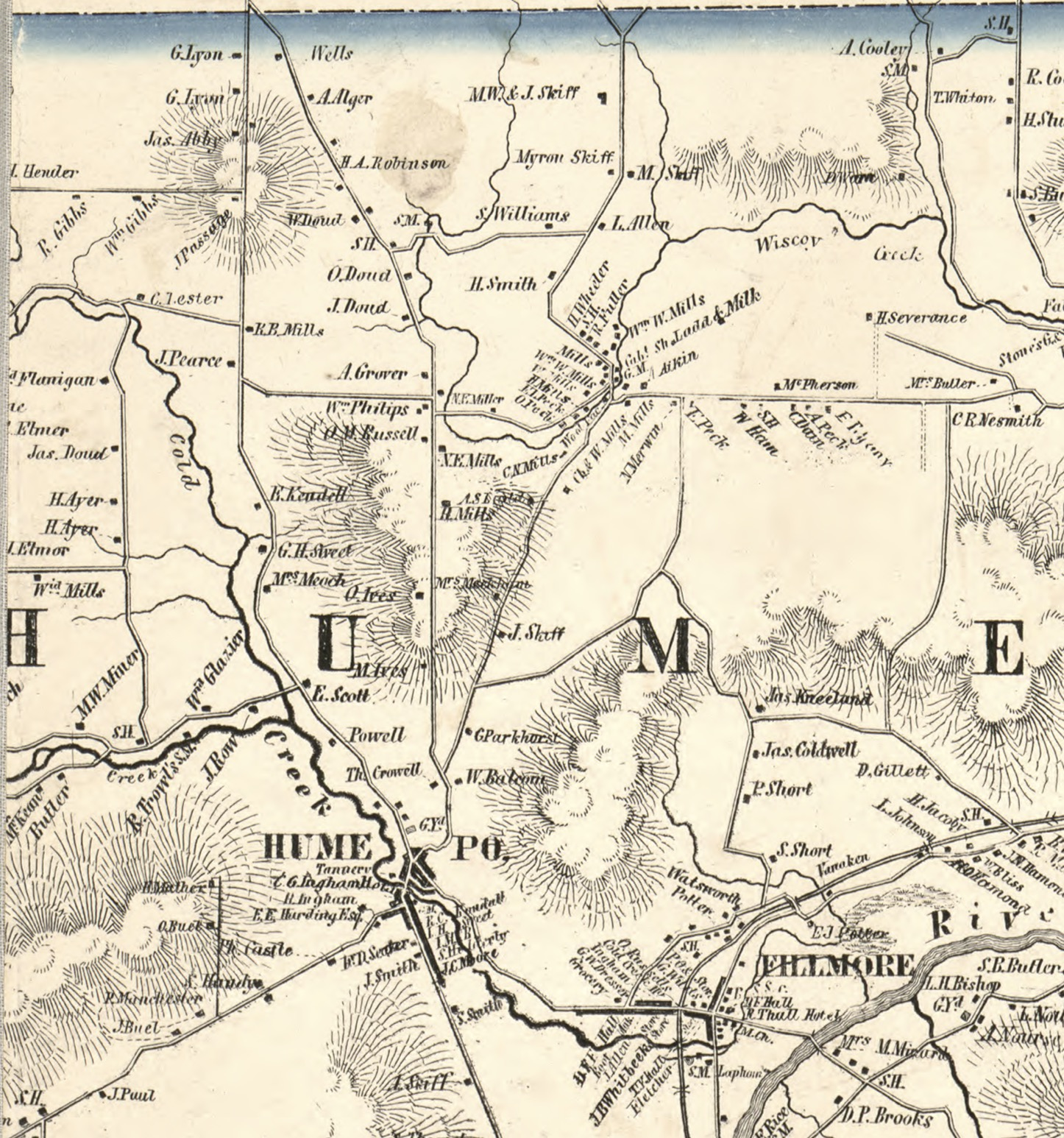
Hume area of 1856 map of Allegany County, New York, a couple decades before Lua was born there.

Lua was the sixth of 10 children born to Ellen McBride and her husband Reuben D. Moore in Hume, New York, a rural small town located in western New York State's Allegany County, about 90 kilometers south of Lake Ontario. Reuben (Reuden) D. Moore (Nov 1, 1818 in Wales, NY - August 19, 1898, Hume, NY) was the son of Welcome Moore who died 1831. Reuben married Ellen, daughter of Scott Andrew McBride and Hannah E. Brown, in 1860; and both Reuben's parents - Lua's paternal grandparents - had already died by then. Reuben was born in Erie County and most of Lua's siblings were born in Wyoming County. The Moore-McBride family had been living in nearby Java as farmers.

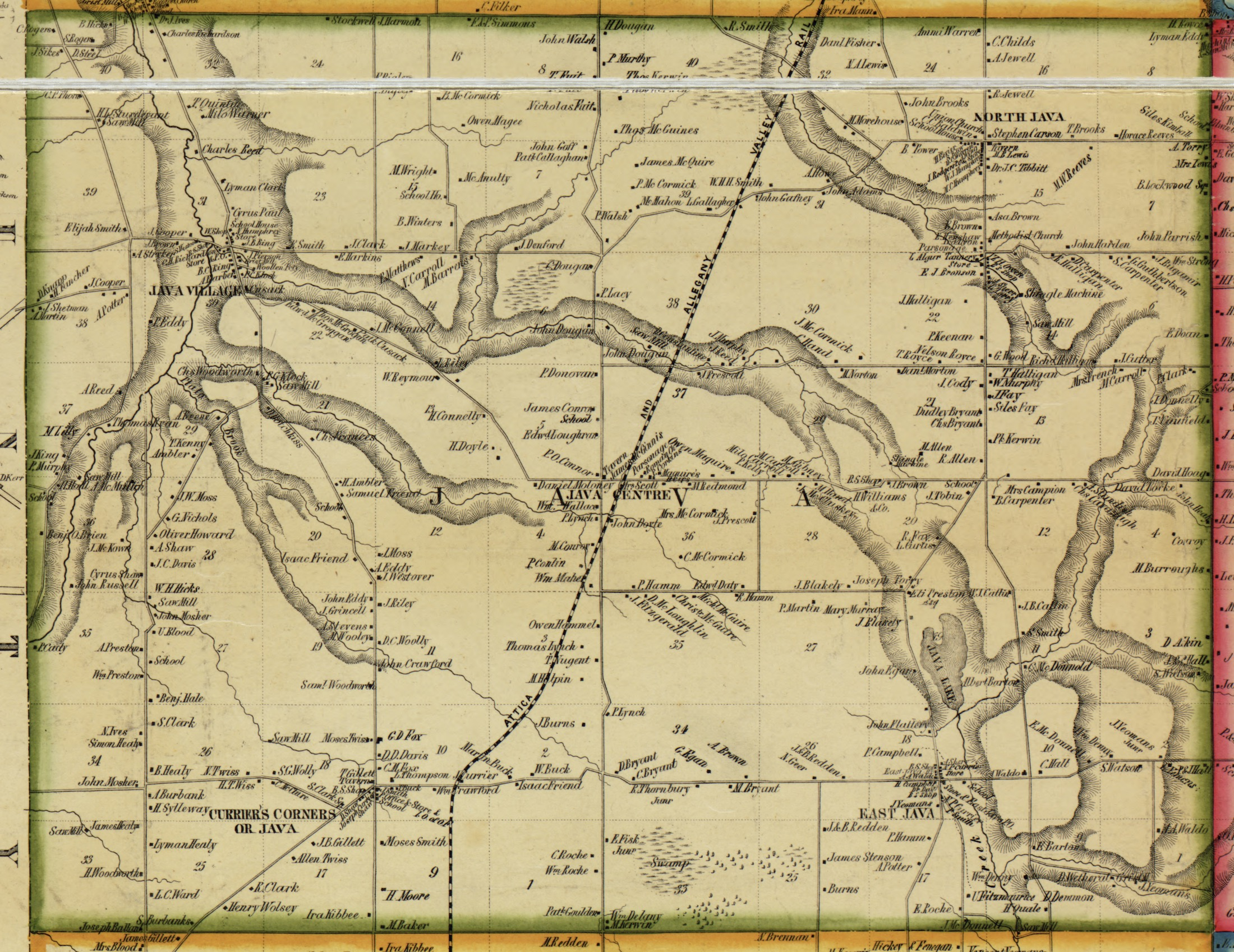
Java area of Wyoming County, New York, 1853, a couple decades before Lua's parents lived there.

In 1872 the family moved to Mills Mills Rd north east of Hume in Allegany County just south of Wyoming County off of the Genesee River, and bought a farm of 150 acres in 1873. The town had been organized in 1822. Siblings Alta and Alice were twins. The Moore family had attended the Baptist Church since 1844 though his mother had been a Quaker. Pastors of the First Baptist Church of Hume as Lua was growing up included: Horton, Langmade, Reed, Bogart, and Robinson. Moore was a fairly well off farmer with a herd of over 3000 sheep at least once. Daughter Donna F. married Howard Blakely of Harriman, Tennessee.

The region was known as the Burned-over district which had had religious revivals and later gained a reputation of burning out the people's capacity for religious excitement. There is a story of mother Ellen with a reputation of asking questions in the Church that were the object of a visit of the pastor talking to Reuben to try to get her to stop bringing up such questions. There was and is a Seventh Day Baptists church in her home town area. Years later Lua described an experience of her youth to her friend May Bolles Maxwell of being baptized - dunked in water in a ritual - and expecting to see or feel a direct gift of the spirit from a new church in town and being disappointed.^{Kindle:656}

Schools were founded across the county by 1825. Granger township to the east had one by 1819. Hume township had 14 oneroom elementary schools by 1869, but it wasn’t until 1894 that school attendance was mandated for children 7 to 14 yrs old. Sixth grade was the usual last grade of students in the county that did go until circa 1900 when higher grades were added. Parental permission was needed to attend high school by law before 1900 and it wasn’t until 1916 that lacking attendance was fined. The first high school wasn't founded in the township until circa 1901-2. Lua would probably have finished her schooling at least by about 1882, if she had gone to school and continued through sixth grade, around age 10-11.

Family oral history has Lua going to Chicago in the later 1880s. In the February 1892 New York State Census Lua is not listed living at the farm - and two other sisters known to have married, to Howard Blakeley, and to Dr. A. B. Harding, are also absent. Indeed Lua with her sisters has been identified in a newspaper clipping from July 1892 placing her arriving from Flint, Michigan, back to visit. Family oral history also had Lua attending the World Parliament of Religions of 1893 in Chicago during the World Columbian Exposition and, it is believed, would have heard of Bahá’u'lláh. William at least was there from 1895 and both were known to be there from knowledge of people in Allegany County before 1896. Lua chose dramatic arts training in Chicago rather than New York for intuitional reasons. Her brother William went there to study homeopathic medicine.^{Kindle:972}

=== Chicago and encountering the Bahá‘í Faith ===
William was studying with Chester Ida Thacher, who then lived in the La Grange neighborhood of Chicago in 1897–1898 and Lua may have done housekeeping for Thacher. Thacher and Lua were listed as members of the Oriental Order of the Magi. Thacher had been active in Christian Science, and Thacher or others may have introduced the Bahá‘í Faith to Lua; however it came about, she joined a class on the religion led by Ibrahim Kheiralla, who had taught Thornton Chase, recognized as the first Bahá'í of the West. Lua had a dream October 17, 1896, which she felt important enough to record: "I dreamed I was in an old one story wooden house--whose roof was somewhat sunken in and broken--My Father and Mother seemed to live in this house only I did not see them--and I was there to do the work--which ever seemed behind hand. I thought it was afternoon and I had not yet made the beds--which I set myself to do--and by the bed--which I thought my Father occupied I found a lamp burning very low--which I extinguished and on going about the room I found other lights burning- which I blew out also! Presently an old man came in who looked very much like Mr. Guile, and said The King is here!" She received the end "lesson" of the class, learning the name of the founder of the Bahá‘í Faith on May 21, 1897, before actually finishing the regular course of classes Kheiralla offered. However in the eyes of Edward Getsinger, when he met them in early 1895, Lua and Thacher already were self-identifying as Bahá'ís or what they would later call "Bahá'í", as others may well have as well. Attendees of these classes at the time were called 'truthseekers'.

Edward was not into religion but accepted an invitation from Thacher to come out to his farm and Lua was there too.^{Kindle:1048} While there Edward was working on a presentation he was going to make when he had a series of three mystical visions.^{Kindle:1089-1124} He then developed a strong enthusiasm for religion which he now shared with Lua. We know little of their courtship and family meetings otherwise; we do know that Lua married Edward C. Getsinger May 26, 1897. Lua's brother William finished the religion class June 18. However Edward later publicly cited a marriage certificate as of May 1896 to Ida Moore in Chicago though perhaps this was garbled in the newspaper reporting.

Lua returned to Hume to enthusiastically tell her family about the new religion. Local newspapers noted Lula in town July 6, 1897, accompanied by an unknown lady friend, and William returned as well on July 9. It is known her mother and four of her siblings joined the religion quickly. In particular her mother Ellen asked an unidentified 'truthseeker' to transcribe 16 pages of its writings. At least one sister of Lua, Ruby "Hebe" Moore, was there when Lua returned who went on to her own pilgrimage later, and variously lived in Washington DC, Baltimore, Worcester, Massachusetts, and finally Fryeburg, Maine, as an active member of the religion. After being joined by Edward they left Hume August 31, 1897, on their way to Ithaca, where Lua organized a study class. Edward himself also took a class in New York and finished it back on October 26, 1897. Six people graduated from Lua's when visited by Kheiralla in January 1898. More people passed it by February 3, 1898. Among those that passed the class was Edward Struven who then introduced the religion to his brother Howard who then went on to found a community in Baltimore along with others who had found the religion other ways and numbered 50 people by 1901. Lua also wrote of being lonesome with Edward away but filled with purpose from the new religion and excited to hear of the advancing work of the community in Chicago. Around this time her brother Orson was in the West Virginia infantry and William served in the medical corps at Fort Sheridan during the Spanish–American War in 1898.

=== First Pilgrimages ===
==== The first ====
During their return to Hume the Getsingers had already spoken of moving to California. Edward had another mystical experience while reading a newspaper story about Phoebe Hearst, determined she had homes in a few cities that he tried to reach out to with letters before determining she had to be at her California home^{Kindle:1089-1124} and left in January 1898 for California to try to reach her. It is believed the newspaper coverage about Hearst being active in a national movement to develop colleges was the one he read.^{Kindle:1142-1162} He had been in San Francisco in February, and was visible again in later July. Hearst family accounts credit Edward seeing her and her not paying attention to other guests at a reception^{Kindle: 1488} at her home, the Hacienda, at Pleasanton, California. Edward’s own account says the first meetings were not about discussing the religion until Lua came.^{Kindle:1501} She arrived by June.^{Kindle:1533} Lua in particular was successful igniting Hearst's interest in the new religion and as well as that of her butler, African-American Robert Turner, who overheard the conversations. Phoebe's response was enthusiastic and she arranged for Lua to being a class which started at the Hacienda and then moved to an apartment of hers in downtown San Francisco.^{Kindle:1566} Meanwhile a guest friend of Hearsts' at the Hacienda died July 31.^{Kindle:1622} This along with other stresses caused her to decide to go on a trip to Paris, Egypt and up to Istanbul by the end of August.^{Kindle:1639} She agreed to add stopping at what was then Ottoman Palestine to see ʻAbdu'l-Bahá, and together they formed a party to go - with Hearst's butler Robert Turner, and some friends Ella Goodall Cooper and Helen S. Goodall and then adding Kheiralla and his wife. Turner would soon be the first African-American Baháʼí.

Lua's father Reuben died August 19, though it remains unclear if Lua learned of this and stopped for the funeral and see the family or if her travels left the messages behind by this point. Hearst’s train to New York left September 10 and arrived in New York September 15 following which she and some of the group spent a few days in DC.^{Kindle:1690} The Getsingers or at least Edward arrived in New York from San Francisco by September 18. The Getsingers gained a passport the next day, and the group left on SS Fürst Bismarck September 22.^{Kindle:1724} The group arrived in Paris in early October^{Kindle:1784} after leaving the boat September 29.^{Kindle:1811} Hearst stopped in Belgium for a commitment. Lua had kept a journal given to her by Helen Goodall on September 13 and the group arrived in Paris on the 29th. They visited sites in Paris.^{Kindle:2067} Lua sent a letter, possibly to Thornton Chase, from Paris September 30. More people joined the party to Haifa including May Bolles, (as she was known at the time,) the future mother of Hand of the Cause Rúhíyyih Khánum. Robert Stockman comments that Lua's "depth of her sincerity was infectious." When they arrived in Paris Hearst was concerned over the health of Bolles and asked Edward to look at her - after examination Edward suggested Lua would be a better treatment for her than anything he could do.^{Kindle:1671} Lua’s first words to May were "There is a Prisoner in ‘Akká who holds the key to Peace” and that was enough for May - “I believe, I believe” she said and fainted.^{Kindle:1696} Lua's effect on Bolles in particular has been seen later as of the kind of healing done of past saints. Laura Barney, best known for later compiling the Baháʼí text Some Answered Questions from her interviews with ʻAbdu'l-Bahá, met Lua in Paris though she converted through contact with Bolles later.^{Kindle:2216} Lua was pictured in a detailed dress with lace and sleeves Expensive items were bought in Paris for ʻAbdu'l-Bahá but later sold and the proceeds distributed to the poor.

The group then sent a petition to ʻAbdu'l-Bahá to approach for Baháʼí pilgrimage October 10, written by Lua and carried by Kheiralla who arrived November 11 after a stay in Egypt and meeting with his family there.^{Kindle:490,507,2602,2619} They were advised to arrive in small groups, ultimately three groups arrived, over several weeks because of restricted living conditions.^{Kindle:1786} The Getsingers left right after celebrating Thanksgiving, and went from France to Italy and left via Naples on SS Regina Margareita,^{Kindle:2179} which made weekly trips to Alexandria, Egypt. so arriving probably December 2.

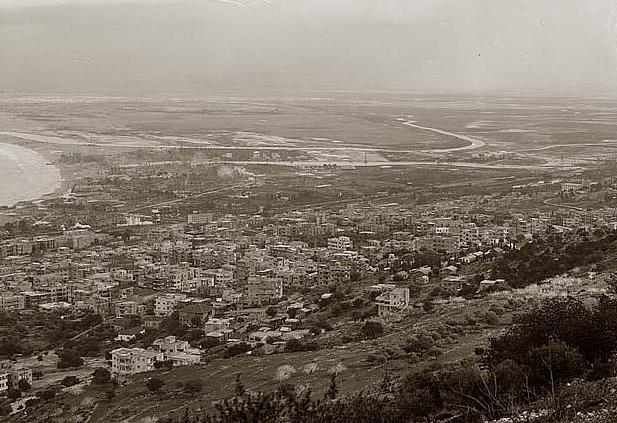
Haifa from hill side 1898

They transferred to HMS Achilles December 6, and then went on to Haifa December 8, the first western believers to arrive on pilgrimage and see ʻAbdu'l-Bahá. Haifa was then a town of some ten thousand with separated Moslem, Christian, and a small Jewish community and had been rebuilt in the 18th century by the Ottomans who shifted governance of the area from ‘Akká to Haifa after the silting up of ‘Akká's harbor in the increasing demands of larger ships.^{Kindle:454,525,541-559} They were welcomed at the port by eastern Baháʼís, were brought to a coffee house where they were greeted by ʻAbdu'l-Bahá's uncle Muhammad-Quli,^{Kindle:454,471} stayed at a hotel near the German Colony which was then outside of the walls of Haifa,^{Kindle:559-577} and didn’t sleep the first night. Another day passed on Friday and they had dinner with a son-in-law of Muhammad-Quli who conveyed the final invitation to visit ʻAbdu'l-Bahá the next morning - still they did not sleep well.^{Kindle:602} Finally they were invited to the house, put on clothes especially bought for the occasion,^{Kindle:2628} and then into the room where ʻAbdu'l-Bahá was. Lua recorded:

Blessed Face of the Prince of the House of David, the King of the whole world.… my heart gave a great throb and scarcely knowing what I was doing I held out my arms, crying: 'My Lord, my Lord!!!' and rushed to Him, kneeling at His Blessed Feet, sobbing like a child; in an instant my husband was beside me, crying as only men can cry!

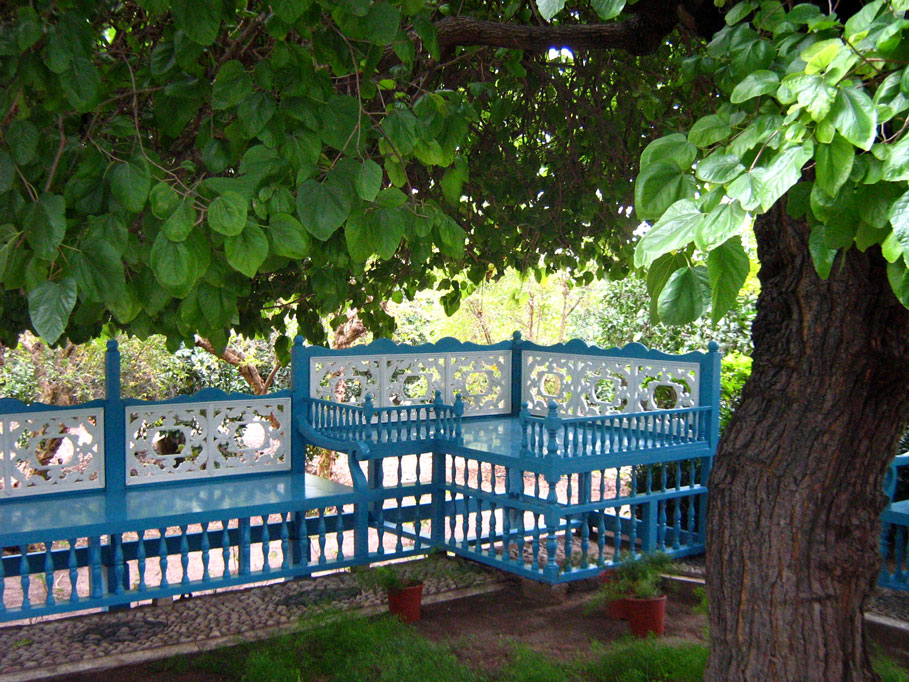
Garden of Ridvan

After being directed for all to sit together for a bit, he then sent Lua to the chambers of his sister, Bahíyyih Khánum; still she couldn’t sleep that night until morning. Later the next day she visited the Ridván Garden in ‘Akká: "…we were permitted to enter this also, to go into the room which He always occupied,[ed - Baháʼu'lláh] kneel before the chair upon which He sat, and to kiss the place upon which the soles of His feet rested!“ Then the group went on to the Shrine of Baháʼu'lláh led by ʻAbdu'l-Bahá and she was given flowers by ʻAbdu'l-Bahá for the American Baháʼís, was given a lesson in spiritualizing actions by being served by ʻAbdu'l-Bahá instead of them serving him, when they returned she had her first long sleep since arriving, and then the group returned to Haifa. Lua and her husband were the first North American Baháʼís to go on Baháʼí pilgrimage. This visit began December 10, 1898, at the House of `Abdu'lláh Páshá. Edward took many pictures in the area.^{Kindle:615-648,3076, 3083, 3101, 3187,4217} The Getsingers did not stay in ‘Akká at the time - ʻAbdu'l-Bahá arranged for them to stay in Haifa that he would use going forward for other occasions.^{Kindle:2756} Bolles arrived^{Kindle:2791} with Hearst's group mid-February, 1899, incognito and in the dark to protect her reputation and her son’s, but enough awareness of visitors to see ʻAbdu'l-Bahá who was then a prisoner had been achieved that limitations were increased later. The Hearst group staying at the house with the Getsingers with Lua acting has host along with some of ʻAbdu'l-Bahá's daughters before going to see him^{Kindle:2791} only stayed a few days, and then returned to Cairo.^{Kindle:2756} A picture of the first two groups together was taken,

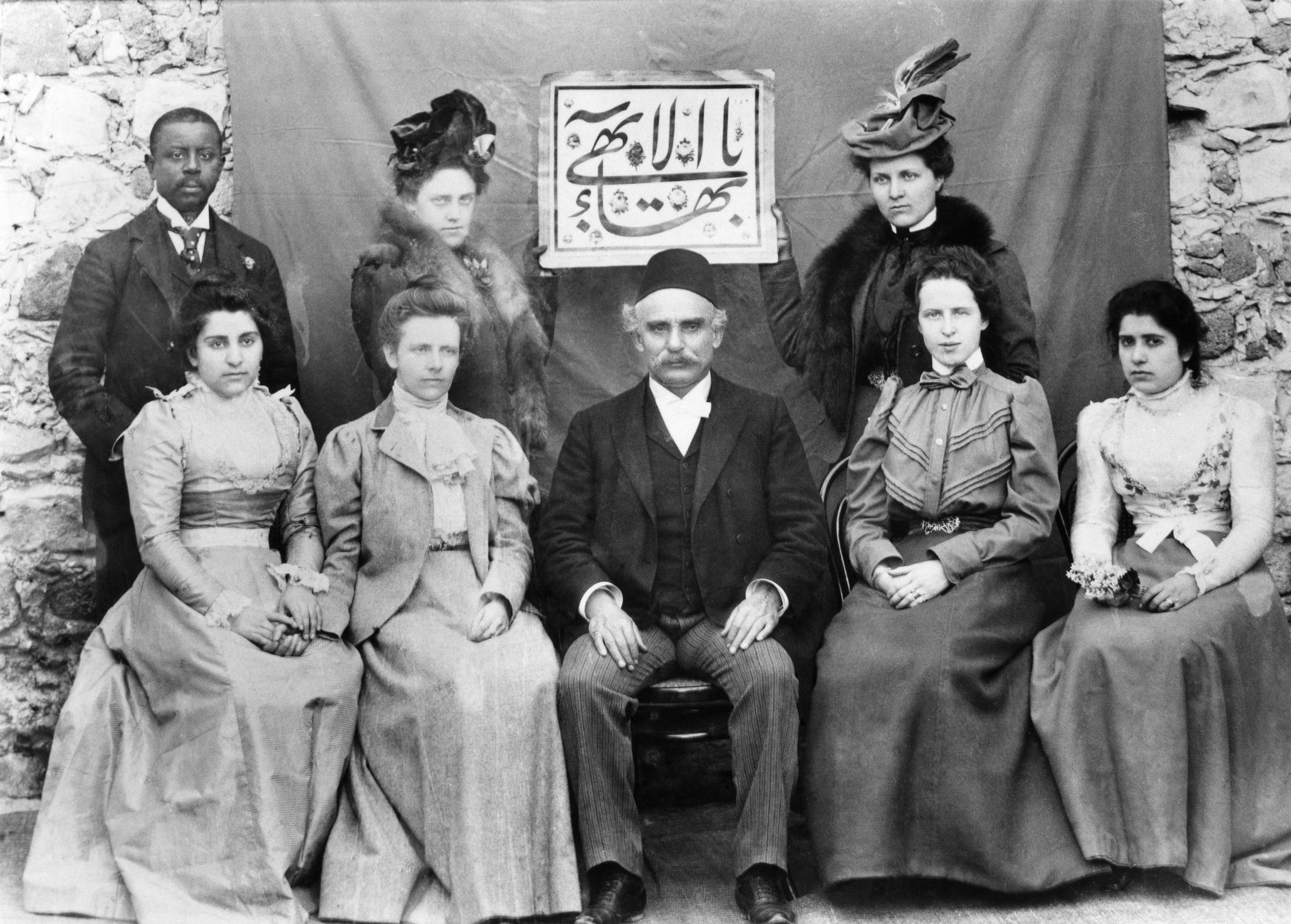
First Western Baháʼí pilgrims (Lua is the woman seated right of the seated man)

as well as another with some of the third group.^{Kindle:1860} Ella Cooper witnessed and wrote of a meeting of the then young Shoghi Effendi, later head of the religion, and ʻAbdu'l-Bahá in March.^{Kindle:2837} Kheiralla brought letters from other early Baháʼís - replies arrived back in America in February including to James and Isabella Brittingham, Howard and Mary MacNutt, Arthur Dodge, Eliza Talbot, and Thornton Chase. The translator might have been Anton Haddad who had stayed back in America. Many of these people became noted among Baháʼís as Disciples of ʻAbdu'l-Bahá.

The available places of pilgrimage at the time were the Shrine of Bahá‘u'lláh at Bahji, the Ridvan Garden, the houses of Abbud and Pasha and the location of the future Shrine of the Báb.^{Kindle:3063} They met Aqa Abdu’l-Qasim who was the gardener there and he told stories of Bahá’u'lláh.^{Kindle:3125} They did not go the House of Abbud and only some went to the location of the future Shrine of the Báb.^{Kindle:3089} When visiting the Shrine of Bahá’u'lláh they were permitted into the chamber where his remains were buried.^{Kindle:3201} This was a signal honor though they were not told of it before hand - normally pilgrims remained outside the room itself.^{Kindle:3228,3278} The visit would have been difficult because present divisions between ʻAbdu'l-Bahá and his half brother were such that they would call out mockingly to visitors.^{Kindle:3201} On the day May Bolles went over 100 eastern Bahá’ís were gathered around outside and a girl sang the song The Holy City and then Nearer, My God, to Thee, with Bahá'ís around the inner garden inside the shrine.^{Kindle:3244-3260}

Biographer Velda Piff Metelmann makes this observation of the effect of the pilgrimage on Lua: "It transformed Lua Getsinger from a relatively care-free young woman, though loyal to her faith, into a passionate follower of ʻAbdu'l-Bahá. He gave her a Persian name, 'Liva' which means 'Banner' in English, and Lua believed that He gave her, as well, a special mission to teach the Faith and granted her extraordinary powers to do so. From this period onward she devoted her life and energy to that end.” A tablet, taken as scripture by Baháʼís, was given to her from ʻAbdu'l-Bahá January 18, 1899, but English translators were limited. She began to study Persian and began a friendship with the daughters of ʻAbdu'l-Bahá, and to also teach them English.

Lua wrote to Thornton Chase February 15, 1899:

…When I left America I thought I knew a good deal… but after seeing the Master… I am sure I know nothing… The Face of the Master is gloriously beautiful - His eyes read one's very soul - still they are full of divine love and fairly melt one's heart!'

Lua also communicates that it became apparent that Kheiralla’s teachings differed both in tone and extent from those of ʻAbdu'l-Bahá. That's also when the flowers arrived and Lua commented she was learning Persian. Letters from Persia and the West were translated, read, and sent on to the Bahá'ís from the other side.^{Kindle:3212,5927} Robert Turner was pointedly treated like a guest and not a servant even when other pilgrims thought he should, though they were not directly criticized and instead came to understand their error tearfully.^{Kindle:3739-3770} Unbeknown to the western Bahá’ís was the arrival of the remains of the Bab during their pilgrimage, during January or February and at least for a time held in the chambers of Bahiyyih Khanum, and the laying of the cornerstone by Abdul-Baha with Kheiralla, called the founder of the American Bahá’í community.^{Kindle:3788-3820} They did see the portraits, pictures and paintings, of the Báb and Bahá’u'lláh which were kept by Bahiyyih Khanum.^{Kindle:4141} The eastern Bahá’ís had been fasting but the western Bahá’ís were not asked to begin fasting and no records among thems noted the practice even through Lua was given the privilege of staying in the household of ʻAbdu’l-Bahá.^{Kindle:4080} Khieralla had argued Bahá’í doctrine and authority of understanding with Edward and with Hand of the Cause Haji Mirza Muhammad Taqiy-i-Abhari and both times ʻAbdu'l-Bahá intervened to keep the peace and stop further arguments;^{Kindle:4884-4901} still Kheiralla had reached out to Abdu’l-Baha’s unfaithful half brother.^{Kindle:4937} In mid-February Lua wrote to Chase "…simply taking the lessons and receiving the ‘Greatest Name’ does not mean that we are confirmed. We must work for that great blessing, and without work we shall never receive it And oh, it is worth all the effort we can make!".^{Kindle:5011}

In mid-March Ottoman officials directed that pilgrims not be allowed to see ʻAbdu'l-Bahá though local officials equivocated.^{Kindle:3879-1896} Still ʻAbdu'l-Bahá asked the Getsingers and two other pilgrims to tarry in Egypt for further instruction.^{Kindle:4223} This turned out to be their first lessons from Mírzá Abu'l-Faḍl and continued into April along with some other trips amidst the growing heat.^{Kindle:4335} Lua began studying Persian for 2 weeks learning easy words and memorized one prayer. Circa March co-pilgrim Ella Goodall passed on in letters back to American Baháʼís that Kheiralla’s book needed revision or may indeed not be published. Kheiralla left ‘Akká March 21 and arrived in New York May 1. In between he had stopped in Paris and attempted to cash a check of Hearstsʼ to himself instead of the intended recipient which did not succeed.^{Kindle:4408} During the voyage Goodall sent another letter saying the book won’t be published any time soon. In Robert Stockman's review of early Baháʼí history in America the “most startling” discovery of the group was that ʻAbdu'l-Bahá contradicted Kheiralla’s views on reincarnation but the stance of the religion on the idea was still not fully understood: Edward now understood that rather than his own soul being a reincarnation there were guardian angels who could “become as one in thought and volition” with the believer and in particular his own such angel was the Apostle John just as Kheiralla's was the Apostle Peter - this was a misunderstanding which became clarified in time.

Circa April on returning to ‘Akká Lua cried tears of happiness during a late morning Tea given by ʻAbdu'l-Bahá. He kept alluding from a material example to a deed to be carried out in a certain spirit. He gave her honey dipped bread and asked her to speak with 'words of honey' and washed her face after the meal and urged her to 'wash faces with love'. Lua writes "and there He lifted up His voice in supplication for me,…. My work, my words, my deeds must tell in the future whether or not He prayed for me in vain!… You must say to all the Believers in America that I love them and pray for them, and in turn I desire that they love and pray for each other,--ever seeking to be united together, living in harmony and concord,--for where division is--God is not."

==== In the States ====
When the Getsingers returned to the States in May they brought some lessons in spiritualizing action, refinements in greater understanding of the teachings of the religion, and a number of gifts for the Baháʼís. These gifts were: the photograph taken of a young ʻAbdu'l-Bahá, a calligraphic design of the Greatest Name, an Arabic copy of the Kitab-i-Aqdas, and a wax cylinder recording of ʻAbdu'l-Bahá chanting which exists to this day. There were also recordings of Bahíyyih Khánum and pilgrims "singing newly composed American Baháʼí hymns" all of which have since been lost, and some copies of prayers, communes and selections from the scripture of the religion.^{Kindle:4973} New York Baháʼí Howard MacNutt began making copies of the picture and Anton Haddad began work translating the Aqdas. The Getsinger's spiritualized actions as taught by ʻAbdu'l-Bahá in the form of their positive engagement in the face of the negative rumors Kheiralla had spread about them, "surprised and pleased" the New York Baháʼís, in the words of Stockman. Hearst withdrew her offer to fund the Kheiralla book.

June 2 the Getsingers traveled back to Ithaca and the Moore family farm.^{Kindle:5011} They stayed at a DC home of Hearst perhaps around June–July.^{Kindle:5050-5066} Then the Getsingers settled in Detroit though with their traveling no Baháʼí community began there until after all these events. Lua began to exchange frequent letters with ʻAbdu'l-Bahá’s daughters and to travel for the interests of the religion. The Getsingers were part of gathering for the American Independence Day picnic in La Grange, Illinois, at which some 300 or more Baháʼís came. They also planned to come again in August to give talks about their pilgrimage experience but Kheiralla raised negative comments about them again which lead to objections to their visit, though it did eventually proceed. Again the Getsingers attempted to remain positive in their engagement and not speak ill of Kheiralla. In a letter August 18, 1899, from Detroit Lua writes of praying for Kheiralla, advising the reader to not challenge words back and forth but seek guidance from 1 Corinthians 3 instead. Other correspondence included on the subject of the question of Baháʼu'lláh's multiple wives which was a settled topic to Lua's understanding. In the coming months however rumors of antagonism between Edward and Kheiralla intensified and MacNutt found himself having to respond as he was referenced in some of the rumors. James Home, Hearst's business agent and aide, negotiated between them to keep her out of the newspapers and exchanges between them. He saw the issue as a personality clash between Kheiralla and Edward. Kheiralla had brought back a copy of the Hidden Words which was acquired by the community and translated and published through Haddad in March 1900.^{Kindle:5513}

Soon Kheiralla began making a claim about him being a "chief" of western Baháʼís; Anton Haddad went to ‘Akká and returned with another tablet denying any administrative existence of a "chief" and instead underscored qualities like humility and service to be the spiritual motivation for promoters of the religion rather than wishes to become leaders. Haddad’s compilation of covenant materials for the American community circulated from 1900^{Kindle:5333} and Haddad recalled ʻAbdu'l-Baha repeated Bahá’u’lláh’s words many times: "My captivity cannot harm Me. That which can harm Me is the conduct of those who love Me, who claim to be related to Me, and yet perpetuate what causeth My heart and My pen to groan."^{Kindle:5475}

The Getsingers visited Chicago with Haddad February 11, 1900, to update the Chicago Baháʼís about ʻAbdu'l-Baha’s statements about “no Chiefs” and that an elected “House of Justice” was needed. About 6-700 attended the meeting including Kheiralla but he did not speak when offered a chance. Edward embraced Kheiralla as a public attempt at reconciliation. A 10 member board was elected in Chicago which did not include Kheiralla nor any person known to favor him and this counsel sent a letter to ʻAbdu'l-Bahá in support of and loyalty to him. Haddad and the Getsingers then went to Kenosha February 16, 1900 and mentioned Kheiralla’s doubts about ʻAbdu'l-Bahá’s station. A letter of Lua's of February 23, 1900, from Detroit to Cincinnati quoted a tablet to her about speaking her words at every opportunity and planning a future visit. Indeed Haddad then went to Ithaca and Baltimore while Lua visited Cincinnati March 25 repeating the message about "no chiefs". The Baháʼís generally evinced no hostility to Kheiralla save perhaps for Edward.

In middle spring 1900, ʻAbdu'l-Bahá's representative ʻAbdu'l-Karím-i-Tihrání arrived to try to settle the matter of leadership. Karím and Kheiralla negotiated in MacNutt’s home for two weeks. On May 8 a public meeting was held in New York with some 200 Baháʼís including the Getsingers who had not been invited. Kheiralla endorsed ʻAbdu'l-Bahá as head of the religion and Edward praised and embraced Kheiralla though Kheiralla did not return the compliments. However Karím sent out a circular letter announcing Kheiralla’s recanting, in Karím's words, and Haddad believed this broke the accord reached between Karím and Kheiralla. The Getsingers were mentioned among the Baháʼís in newspaper coverage of the Karím challenge against Kheiralla. Other meetings were attempted to heal the breach including Karím and translators coming to Chicago, on money raised by Baháʼís in New York organized by Thornton Chase, but Kheiralla never attended the meetings and accusations began to multiply instead. Finally Karím left August 5, 1900, without a resolution. In October Marion Kheiralla, his now former 4th wife, was sent by ʻAbdu’l-Baha=á back to America with Assadu’llah to aid in advancing the understanding of the Bahá'ís.^{Kindle:5549} By that summer Lua's sister Ruby/Hebe was working as a servant in another Hume residence.

Meanwhile Marion Jack encountered the religion in Paris in 1900 through Bolles^{Kindle:2216} and heard of the name Lua. Later she did one or two paintings of Lua that are still in the US National Archives.

==== The second ====
The second pilgrimage for the Getsingers came in the fall of 1900 leaving a couple weeks after Karím, and with the Dodge and Hoar families. The Getsingers gained a passport in August, and traveled through Paris in September during which time there was much discussion about reincarnation. They recalled ʻAbdu'l-Bahá calling Kheiralla “Baha’s Peter” and extrapolated that Karím was the return of the prophet Job, Edward was the Apostle John and Lua was Mary Magdalene. Speculation began that May Bolles was somehow the reincarnation of Joan of Arc. Kheiralla was “working out his karma” for having rejected Jesus three times. Juliet Thompson joined the religion in Paris in 1901 as well. Later in 1901 ʻAbdu'l-Bahá sent Mírzá Abu'l-Faḍl to correct the understandings in Paris. From Paris the families made their way towards Palestine. The Dodges were quarantined in Beirut and arrived in Haifa September 25. The Getsingers arrived in Haifa still in September. Hoar's notes of the pilgrimage mentions that they had breakfast with ʻAbdu'l-Bahá almost every morning and then there would be an hour long lesson with translators usually on the Baháʼí interpretation of the Bible or on the nature of spiritual growth and the nature of the soul again often using the Bible for commentary. The Hoars and Dodges stayed about two weeks and then left October 9 and visited Baháʼís in Paris on the way home. Sometime after they left the Getsingers moved their study with Mírzá Abu'l-Faḍl to Port Said, Egypt, until March 1 and then they returned to Haifa again. Lua later reported that ʻAbdu'l-Bahá said to love Abu'l-Faḍl like a father.

The Getsingers gained much more information on the religion on the second pilgrimage compared to the first. The new clarity this time was that the religion did not accept any form of reincarnation - “souls do not return” - which was spread in various letters back to America. In one Lua wrote: “Don’t let this change in the teaching effect (sic) you…. I have heard from America that many are shaken … What does it matter whether we have ever been on this earth before or not. We are here now in the greatest period that has ever existed since the world began…" However they kept up a revered tone about ʻAbdu'l-Bahá in such letters as to the Chicago Baháʼís October 19, 1900, saying "… our revered Lord and Master, the Beloved Son of God, His Greatest Branch and Mystery… The same Holy Spirit, that spoke in Jesus Christ 1900 years ago, today speaks in Him, and through him doeth all good works." A profile of the Baháʼís was published in newspapers through an interview of the MacNutts and the Getsingers were mentioned away on pilgrimage and presenting this kind terminology of ʻAbdu'l-Bahá - the newspaper article also included a translation of a letter presented as signed by ʻAbdu'l-Bahá though the translator is not stated. However while early western believers conflated the stations of Jesus and ʻAbdu'l-Bahá and showed extremes of reverence it also empowered women to flout social conventions easily but still follow ʻAbdu'l-Bahá’s direction even over the objections of their husbands. Copies of Lua’s letters were typewritten into 6 pages in 1900 and circulated containing her interpretations, prophecies of Bahá’u'lláh, and understandings of the life after death. A picture of the period includes Lua.

Lua sent a letter to Ella Cooper March 23, 1901, from Haifa mentioning she had read Edward Granville Browne's rececnt article in the Asiatic Journal, explained the Baháʼí teaching of the Manifestation of God using the analogy of mirror and sun, of the Holy Spirit as rays from the sun, and that ʻAbdu'l-Bahá is not the soul of Jesus reincarnated but of the same Holy Spirit though still granting its manifestation in ʻAbdu'l-Bahá a higher position than that of Jesus. The letter goes on to encourage the high treatment Baháʼís should have for each other. Again the topic of multiple wives was raised and trying again in a faulty way to explain the stations of Baháʼu'lláh and ʻAbdu'l-Bahá - that one made the laws and the other fulfilled them and that fulfilling them was a higher position. There were a few more Bahá'ís now present who could advance the work of translation - notably Ishti‘ál-ibn-i-Kalántar, better known as Ali-Kuli Khan.^{Kindle:5530,5589} By the second pilgrimage Hearst had contributed money for repair of a road to the burgeoning Shrine of the Báb and was photographed by Edward.^{Kindle:6159} In 1901-2 several more letters from various secretaries of ʻAbdu'l-Bahá resonated about the high station service and love among the believers. One wrote the book Memories of Nine Years in ‘Akká and mentions Lua at some length. The Getsingers were back in Paris in June 1901.

The public coverage of the split between those that sided with ʻAbdu'l-Bahá like the developments at Greenacre, a spiritual retreat with then new interests in the religion, the MacNutts, Dodges, and Getsingers against Kheiralla continued. After second pilgrimage Getsingers went to California assisted by Hearst.^{Kindle:6138} However publicity about Hearst's involvement in the religion had already circulated early as mid-October 1900 and carried into 1901 while still covering the split between Kheiralla and Karim. After the first pilgrimage attempts at correspondence on behalf of Hearst by Lua were leaked naming her involvement in the religion at a time of rising considerations of her son’s political activities and so Hearst dismissed the Getsingers from their stay at her home in 1901.^{Kindle:6195} Other letters disabusing her authoring of those letters were themselves again published without her permission.^{Kindle:6195} The Getsingers had to end traveling to promote the interests of the religion.^{Kindle:6215} By October Edward was trying to establish an import company in New York and a store in Detroit and a main office in DC where he anticipated staying. Newspapers noted in December that Lua already traveled twice to Acre and quotes Lua's letter of the first pilgrimage.

=== Extended pilgrimage and petitions ===
The community progressed sharing copies of letters of and about ʻAbdu'l-Bahá and the Baháʼí teachings. Lua's belief she had a mission to promulgate the religion was reinforced and Edward's belief was that he had a mission to connect science and religion. The Getsingers received financial assistance from Helen Goodall and Agnes Parson and others. Lua returned to Palestine without Edward and lived in the household of ʻAbdu'l-Bahá and teaching English to his daughters and helping with translations.^{Kindle:6215}

One story recorded is that while there Lua was instructed to visit a home of a friend of ʻAbdu'l-Bahá in ‘Akká but it was filthy in her eyes to the point that she fled. He ordered her to return and do right by this friend. It is also recorded she sang the hymn “Nearer My God to Thee” for ʻAbdu'l-Bahá from the terrace of the Haifa house while looking towards the Shrine of Bahá’u'lláh. Lua helped translate the heartbreaking tablet/song for Thomas Breakwell by ʻAbdu'l-Bahá. Breakwell was an English-American Baháʼí who had been vacationing in Paris, became attracted to the religion through Bolles, and soon died of tuberculosis. In Haifa Lua became known to be seeking to become a martyr for the religion like Táhirih, (a heroic figure of Bábí history that Baháʼís hold up); she enlisted two friends to pray for her with Bábí prayers and asked ʻAbdu'l-Bahá to grant her request on her behalf. ʻAbdu'l-Bahá’s response paraphrased was that martyrdom was a high station which Baháʼu'lláh conferred on whomever he chose and that the physical fact of being killed was not the point, for there were those who had not been killed but were counted as martyrs, and also those who had been killed but who had not attained the station of a martyr. The essence of martyrdom was service, and she had, "thanks be to God", arisen to serve. Documentation is lacking but somehow a particular mission came to mind. In the summer of 1901 a small group of women sought a diplomatic intervention on behalf of the Bahá'ís of Persia during a particular wave of persecutions. This did not lead to fruition. The next year, ʻAbdu'l-Bahá saw the time, place, and person of Lua appropriate to the task.

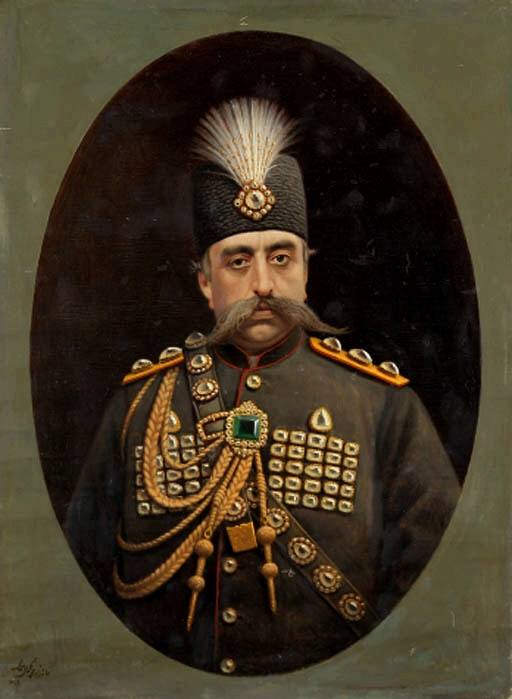
Portrait of Muzaffar al-Din Shah Qajar by Kamal-ol-molk, 1902

On July 5, 1902, Lua got a passport in her own name in New York and lists various facts of her life - she was born in Hume, New York, had been maintained her official residence in Detroit the last 2 years, and the paper work was witnessed by Josephine C. Cowles of New York. Lua was then back in France before September 28.^{Kindle:4359} She was there to present a petition to Mozaffar ad-Din Shah Qajar, then ruler of Iran, with Mariam Haney, while the Shah was there. She was not immediately welcomed. A picture of Lua and associates was taken in Paris. At some point during the stay in Paris she made contact with Doña Eugénie de Montijo, the last Empress of the French and then widow of Emperor Napoleon III, and attempted to present the religion to her but she rejected the offer. Lua began prolonged prayer vigils to be allowed to present a petition in person to the Shah. Hippolyte Dreyfus assisted Lua by translating the petition into French, and to gain an audience.^{Kindle:3200} At first only granted a meeting with the Grand Vizier, Lua pressed the matter and finally met directly with the Shah himself. The petition was for the Baháʼís to be granted an audience with him, that he protect the Baháʼís of Persia and that he ask the Sultan of Turkey to allow ʻAbdu'l-Bahá freedom to travel.

“…in the grand reception hall of the Elysee Palace hotel where the entire suite of one hundred and fifty Persians were awaiting His Majesty, this one American woman, the only woman in this large group of men, stepped forward and handed to His Majesty the petition she had faithfully written. Lua also delivered a forceful speech suggesting that such 'uncivilized' cruelty was shaming Persia, and that if the mullás examined the history of Islam, 'they would soon see that the shedding of blood is not a means of annulling, but rather the cause of promulgating every religious movement.' Lua then told the assembled men a heartrending story of a woman whose husband, brother and eleven year-old son were viciously killed by mobs, and when the woman 'throws herself upon their mangled corpses' she 'is beaten into insensibility'." Lua asked the Shah, "…is it justice on the part of your Majesty to allow such heinous crimes to go unpunished?"

He agreed to intercede on behalf of the Baháʼís but that the freedom of ʻAbdu'l-Bahá he could not grant - Lua then began plans to leave for Constantinople to appeal to the Ottoman Caliph directly but ʻAbdu'l-Bahá intervened and prevented that appeal.^{Kindle:4359} However conditions in Iran only subsided a few years.

Selena Crosson comments in her PhD dissertation: "For the sake of justice, in large part for women, she boldly puts herself forward to stand alone in a group of men against the orthodoxy of the mullahs and the state, representing symbolically the patriarchal superstructure of the old world order. In this effort, Lua Getsinger, was (at least) triply disadvantaged in an eastern male arena (albeit protected by the environs of Paris). She was a woman, considered of little account, and, moreover, a western woman, stereotypically morally suspect in eastern male eyes. She was a farangi, a Euro-foreigner, considered ritually 'unclean' by Muslims, and worse, a Baháʼí, maligned in Persia for heresy, moral crimes, and espionage. Lua had no wealth for bribes, or connections inside or outside of Iran. She had no temporal power and, like Táhiríh, relied only on words, which in the Baháʼí writings are frequently cast in masculinised military metaphorical language as being akin to 'swords.' However, when Miriam Haney summed up Lua, she also emphasized 'motherhood'. Her irresistible charm, her remarkable gifts as a teacher, her forceful character and unique personality with the great and added charm of the spirit, this together with the fruit of her confirmed and distinguished services, placed her in the class of the world's greatest Baháʼí teachers." And again Crosson observes: "For an eastern leader of stature to send a western woman as an official representative to converse with high-level eastern potentates was nearly unprecedented, demonstrating the confidence ʻ bdu'l Bahá(sic) had in these women, particularly when there were many men, both eastern and western, whom He could have sent. Correspondingly, the women placed absolute certainty in what they considered the inspired veracity of ʻAbdul Bahá(sic), whatever their circumstances or misgivings about their abilities.”

The date is unknown, but Martha Root, later a prominent member of the religion and posthumously appointed a Hand of the Cause, the highest appointed position in the Baháʼí Faith, by Shoghi Effendi, echoed a story told her by Bolles that one day Lua was in Paris and gave up a trip to London, tickets and all, when she heard there was an interested party to hear about the religion.^{Kindle:7004}

ʻAbdu'l-Bahá wrote a tablet to Lua addressed to her in New York December 9, 1902:

Verily, I invoke God with all my heart, that He may make thee a sign of Severance, a banner of attraction, a lamp of Sanctity; so that thou may'st be severed from all the grades (or concerns) of the earthly world & be adorned with the fullest Gifts of the Kingdom; until no voice may be heard from thee except 'O Beha-El-Abha' & no quality may be known in thee except sacrifice in all conditions in the Path of God; that thou may'st sacrifice thy spirit for the Spirit of God, thy good pleasure to the Good Pleasure of God, thy desire to the Desire of God & thy will to the Will of God; & that all may testify that 'this is no other than a severed, detached, sanctified & purified maid-servant in the Threshold of Behá.' Truly, I say unto thee! This is a station the lights of which shine & beam forth in the Kingdom of God, & the morn of which dawns upon all regions forevermore! All else save this is no other than confused dreams, imaginations & superstitions 'which fatten not (i.e. impart no benefit), neither shall they satisfy one of any truth'.

It goes on to encourage respect and care for Edward’s opinions and wishes as well.

There is also a prayer for Lua that has survived. It begins "Thou knowest, O God, and art my witness that I have no desire in my heart save to attain Thy good pleasure, …" An original manuscript of this prayer, held in the Baháʼí archives, is dated 1905, but Lua's own copy bears the date March 28, 1903. Versions of the prayer occur with a line that has been used in a number of songs composed by Baháʼís: "To teach is to learn, to learn is to work, to work is to serve, to serve is to love, to love is to sacrifice, to sacrifice is to die, to die is to live, to live is to strive, to strive is to rise above all earthly limitations and enter the eternal realms" though this has been superseded by a newer translation.

By May 28, 1903, Lua was back in Haifa - she wrote a letter to Dreyfus of observing the Ascension of Baháʼu'lláh holy day with ʻAbdu'l-Bahá's family and describes the relationship of Baháʼu'lláh to ʻAbdu'l-Bahá in her own words as one who “abdicated His Throne in favor of His dearest and Eldest Son". August 26, 1903, she wrote a letter to Juliet Thompson from ‘Akká. Juliet had sent a self-portrait to Haifa and Lua wrote of the sadness of ʻAbdu'l-Bahá about the persecution of Persian Baháʼís.

Lua is known to have had some kind of major incident though the date is unknown - of having a period of “nervous prostration” as it was later called.

Another story of uncertain date is that of her trying to walk in the literal footsteps of ʻAbdu'l-Bahá. Selena Crosson's 2013 PhD in history quotes it:

She and ʻAbdu'l-Bahá were walking along the beach. Lua dropped behind and began placing her feet into His footprints. Early Baháʼí Muriel Ives Barrow Newhall tells the story, which she says was told to her by Grace Robarts Ober, a spiritual 'child' of Lua Getsinger: After a few moments the Master turned to ask what she was doing. 'I am following in your footsteps,' said Lua. He turned away and they walked on. A few moments later, He turned again, 'Do you wish to follow in my footsteps?' He asked. 'Oh, yes,' said Lua. They walked on - and ʻAbdu'l-Bahá turned again, 'Lua! Do you wish to follow in my footsteps?' His tone was louder and stern. 'Oh, yes,' said Lua again. Then, the third time he stopped and faced her. 'Lua!' it was almost a shout, 'Do you wish to follow in My footsteps?' 'Oh, yes!' said Lua for the third time - and with that, a great tarantula jumped out from a hillock of sand and bit her ankle. ʻAbdu'l-Bahá saw this and paid no attention, turning away and again walking. Lua followed, still fitting her footsteps into His. Her ankle swelled, the pain became excruciating, till, finally, she sank down with the agony of it. Then ʻAbdu'l-Bahá picked her up and carried her to the ladies quarters, where the Greatest Holy Leaf [ʻAbdu'l-Bahá's sister, Bahíyyih Khánum] put her to bed. The agony increased. Lua’s temperature flamed; delirium set in. Finally, the Greatest Holy Leaf could stand it no longer and she implored ʻAbdu'l-Bahá to heal her. He examined her carefully then laid His hands gently on her forehead. The temperature drained away, her head cleared she was healed. And it was only later that it was explained to her that she had been suffering from a strange and virulent condition of her blood which the bite of the tarantula had cured. In another version, Lua Getsinger is stung by a scorpion, and the fever and healing episodes are omitted. ʻAbdu'l-Bahá’s continues to walk until Lua’s suffering is unbearable, then stops and gently tells her, “This is what it means to walk in My footsteps.” The lesson remains consistent.

Newspaper coverage in her family's home area appears in October 1903 that Lua is thought to be shot and beheaded, but it was a false alarm. Perhaps this was a garbled reference to the above events - of her losing her head as a metaphor her hearing of the plight of the Persian Baháʼís, "following in ʻAbdu'l-Bahá's footsteps" in his sadness over the persecution of the Baháʼís. Lua again worked on a mission to present a petition in fall of 1903 sent to Teheran; in this effort she shares the story of the Varqá martyrdom. This led to a little more relief. In December 1903 Lua wrote a letter to the Shah in thanks for action and justice for the Baháʼís - a letter signed along with many French Baháʼís.

Edward stayed at the Hannen home Washington DC while Lua was long in holy land.

=== The Washington, DC community, travels, and race ===
Lua co-wrote notes of her pilgrimage which were published as Mercy and Justice April 27, 1904. In June letters to Lua in Paris from Baháʼís in Palestine called her “mother” and indeed ʻAbdu'l-Bahá called her "Ummuʼl-Muʼminín" - "Mother of the Believers", a term also associated with the Islamic figure Fatimah. Lua arrived in America July 19, 1904, on the SS Finland. Joseph and Pauline Hannen first heard Lua in person in August 1904 in New York at the farewell of Abu'l-Faḍl, who had been their teacher in the religion in Washington, DC.

Baháʼís, noted as Babists, were profiled in a widely echoed newspaper story from January 1905 mostly based on an account of Myron Phelps' pilgrimage - it briefly mentions the Getsingers or at least Edward in the early presence of the religion in America. In February Thornton Chase commented about Lua in a letter, saying it was his impression that Lua had "changed greatly and for the better.… (seeming) older, and more quiet and reserve", was wearing her blue color-schemed clothing, and was studying Persian at a university. This may be the first mention of Lua's "blue costume". Since her youth Lua had tended to a flamboyant mode of dress while avoiding fashions of the day. Some pictures of her in clothing have been published.^{Kindle:1696} ʻAbdu'l-Bahá had asked her to dress in a less conspicuous fashion and drew a costume that she then made: a form of dress with royal dark blue panels draping with insets of different fabric including silk trimmings with a hat with its own drapes. Still Lua could pass as a local Christian woman in the streets of Haifa at the time. Persian culture tended to not place Western women into the context of Eastern women but treated as a kind of “honorary male” who were then in a position to learn “a wide repertoire of more culturally sensitive performances of ʼwomanhoods' and or 'Bahaʼi womanhoods', used adaptively and strategically as they traveled throughout the world”. Lua presented at the service weekly in New York advertised from late July and wearing her signature outfit - the newspapers described "There is in New York a religious service each Sunday morning where the contribution box is never seen. More than this, all seats are free, and the poorest are invited and welcomed…." A newspaper article followed the next week too. Subsequent articles spread around the country began to include a drawing of her in her "blue costume".

The Getsingers lived with Helen Ellis Cole in New York before moving to DC in April, 1906. Lua also traveled to Boston from New York in the fall of 1905 following which new Baháʼís from her influence included Harlan Ober and Alfred Lunt, (who later had leadership positions in the religion - see Green Acre Baháʼí School. Lua also wrote The Practice of Prayer relying on Biblical quotes. Even before moving, Lua also traveled to DC to give a talk on the religion at Pythian Temple. Following her interventions in diplomacy there were two letters from the Persian diplomatic legation in DC to her the spring of 1906 and then another in 1908. In July ʻAbdu'l-Bahá sent a tablet to Edward which stressed a high position for Lua and to show kindness and respect for her in multiple ways. In November Lua went to Baltimore to give a public talk on the religion as well as speaking at the home of the Struven family that had had contact back before the first pilgrimage - and the community paid the fair for some Baháʼís of Baltimore to travel to DC to hear Lua talk there.

In the winter of 1906-7 ʻAbdu'l-Bahá announced the goal of sending Americans to India. Abu'l-Faḍl suggested Hooper Harris and then a companion was suggested and Lua's brother William Moore was named. Hooper Harris was surprised to be asked and William Moore agreed to come along but contracted and died of Yellow Fever. William had been betrothed to Louise Stapfer and upon his death Louise and Lua began a deep friendship that would last the rest of Lua's life, now just a decade ahead. Some years later Edward and Lua would both take steps to facilitate Louise meeting and eventually marrying John Bosch named in honor with the Bosch Baháʼí School. Lua asked Harlan Ober to go on this service to India in the place of her deceased brother.

Lua spoke at the homes of African Americans Rhoda Turner and Pocahontas Pope along with Howard MacNutt. Following that contact, African American Louis George Gregory’s first Baháʼí meeting was to hear Lua speak in a meeting room of the Corcoran Gallery of Art who addressed the history and persecution of Baháʼís in Persia. in late 1907. Only three came to that meeting - Gregory and two others, all black, though Pauline Knobloch Hannen and Lua were white ladies acting as host and speaker for the small meeting. “Her recital was brief but vivid” Gregory said of it later. Lua's sister Ruby/Hebe applied for a passport in March 1907 in New York witnessed by Edward.

Lua also continued her travels reaching as far as Montreal by December 12, 1907.^{Kindle:5114} She spoke to large audiences that year and returning each of the next two years. In early 1908 Lua accompanied Stanwood Cobb on his first pilgrimage to see ʻAbdu'l-Bahá.

A letter of September, 1908, of Lua's begins a persistent growing friendship - Metelmann comments: "It was to Mrs. Nourse that Lua revealed her most intimate thoughts and her spontaneous joy in life, as well as her brilliant powers of description.” Indeed there were “five souls for whom she would gladly sacrifice her life" - Mariam Haney, Mary Lucas, May Maxwell, Juliet Thompson, Louise Stapfer. In November 1908 a Baháʼí community gathering was organized by Lua and Cowles after the death of Pauline Knobloch Hannen’s mother. Lua with a party of three then went on pilgrimage January, 1909, again including Stanwood Cobb this time coming down from his teaching position in Constantinople. In 1909 she was correspondence with Agnes Parsons writing from New York but not able to wait until March to see her. While they were away a profile of the religion in America in a DC newspaper with pictures and an article covering a page noted 35 communities of Baháʼís in the country with some 200 in DC including a community practice of race amity; a list of local members included Lua.

Following the initiatives of reaching the black community and Gregory's involvement, a group of Baháʼís made a presentation to the DC black community forum, the Bethel Literary and Historical Society, with presenters Joseph Hannen, husband of Pauline, Howard MacNutt, and Lua, approaching mid-October 1909 and some of the coverage made it into the New York Age of national circulation. Indeed this turned into a series of Bethel meetings the next several weeks. There is a picture of the DC Baháʼí community with Edward holding up the sign of the "Greatest Name in 1909 from the back of the room. Edward was then active in the Persian-American Educational Society mostly operating out of DC.

Lua traveled again to Haifa the winter 1909-1910, into the spring. She arrived back through New York March 16, 1910, via France on the RMS Oceanic coming with Agnes Parsons and Dr. Fareed. On March 23 Lua attend a meeting in DC, and visited the gravesite of Amalie Knobloch, Pauline Hannen's mother, March 27. In June the Getsingers traveled to Boston to give a talk for the religion followed by one in DC and then by August the Getsingers were giving another talk in DC. During the trip north in June they saw May Maxwell in New York then pregnant with Rúhíyyih Khánum.

A further group presentation for the Bethel Society including Lua, Fannie Knoblock, Joseph Hannen, and Ameen Fareed, occurred in early April, following which Lua was a delegate to the national Baháʼí convention representing the DC community. Come June the Getsingers were visible in Baltimore, doing a series of meetings. Lua's mother Ellen had moved to Tennessee with her daughter in the Blakeley family, and Lua went to see her August.

For her work in travels for the religion Lua had been noted among a list nationally prominent people in the religion in that first decade in America. Lua was also among short list of well-known promulgators of the religion never elected to the national administration.

=== California ===
Gregory went on pilgrimage in March 1911 and was carrying a letter of introduction by Edward which someone, perhaps Lua, had translated into Persian. Gregory went on to be another prominent member of the religion and posthumously appointed a Hand of the Cause by Shoghi Effendi during his ministry as head of the religion.

Around the spring of 1911 Lua's youngest brother Elwyn died. A new project arrived for Lua when ʻAbdu'l-Bahá instructed that Lua and Fareed go to California to present the religion - a task for which she was greatly thankful for but later felt deeply betrayed by Fareed. Eventually there was defamation of Lua’s character after Fareed left the religion.

Lua and Fareed were visible in multiple cities - San Diego, La Jolla, Point Loma, and gave a talk on the SS California. Newspaper coverage in Los Angeles in March noted Lua had seven trips to ‘Akká by then and that there were about bout 100 Baháʼís in the LA area.

Lua was remembered in DC at meetings of the Baháʼís. Meanwhile Lua and Fareed went to Tijuana to give medical assistance to those wounded from a battle, by June 29, 1911; probably at the Second Battle of Tijuana. Later Baháʼís of the area of Tijuana took note it was Lua who was the first to bring the religion there. In August Fareed was noted in newspaper coverage of their presence at a Long Beach "Spiritual Congress".

In September their talk for the religion back in Los Angeles was noted in the newspaper. In October Lua and Fareed were in meetings in San Francisco of which there was much coverage in the newspapers. Among the contacts made was then Berkeley Mayor J. Stitt Wilson, and Juanita Storch (1895-1987) who left a diary record of encountering the religion, joined it, and served it for 75 years - she learned of the religion from Lua and Fareed before October 29, 1911. Lua's talk December 17 in San Francisco is one of the few preserved.

During her time in California Lua’s handwriting changed - looser, flowing and larger. Juliet Thompson wrote a letter to Lua after returning from Europe where she went to the First Universal Races Congress and then with ʻAbdu'l-Bahá in Switzerland. Suddenly Fareed was summoned away without explanation and Lua remained alone and spoke December 31. Lua and Fareed had introduced the religion to some 5000 people in California.

Lua was remembered again in a profile of DC Baháʼís in January 1912. Meanwhile she spoke at a California club attended by John Hyde Dunn already identifying as a Baháʼí, and he sought her out repeatedly to learn further of the religion. Dunn would also go on to be a prominent member of the religion and posthumously appointed a Hand of the Cause by Shoghi Effendi. Then Lua was joined in a talk by Thornton chase in San Francisco where she said:

…we must all recognize the fact that God is one God, one Father, one Creator of us all, and that we are all now here, living in one home, members of one family, brothers and sisters. We do not realize this. Very few people on earth realize this great truth, this great fact. If we did, we would have peace. We would not be talking about it so much. We would have it. It would be an established fact. It would just be The sun does not have to declare itself over and over as a shining luminous body. It is. And could humanity come into the understanding that God is one, that this earth, this whole planet, is a home for His creatures, and that we are all now members of His family, brothers and sisters, why peace would be. It is just a lack of realization on our part…

Late in January Lua was visible in the newspaper in San Diego. Later in April Lua had been to Napa with Helen Goodall.

=== ʻAbdu'l-Bahá in the West ===
Records of ʻAbdu'l-Bahá's travels in the West are fairly detailed but who accompanied him are not. Some mentions of Lua do exist. John Bosch joined the Baháʼís in Chicago and saw Lua there in April. In the same period the Hannens were in Chicago and Lua invited people to wear one of ʻAbdu'l-Bahá’s coats in the hotel and say a prayer following which Pauline's hearing returned gradually and she was still talking about this in 1928.

In early May Lua was among presenters before the talk by ʻAbdu'l-Bahá at the closing session of the national Bahá'í convention and was a delegate representing the San Francisco Baháʼís for the groundbreaking of the House of Worship. A golden shovel was given to ʻAbdul-Bahá to open the ground but the ground was too hard. A pickaxe was borrowed and then ʻAbdu'l-Bahá broke the ground. Corinne True, later appointed another Hand of the Cause, then asked that a woman have a role. ʻAbdu'l-Bahá asked Fareed to urge Lua forward twice and it was she who then turned the first spade of dirt. True did it next and then followed representatives of races and nationalities. About a week later ʻAbdu'l-Bahá was in Cleveland and Lua and Edward were among those there and appeared in local news, and then in Pittsburgh. After arriving in New York on May 11 several ladies including Lua and Juliet Thompson worked preparing ʻAbdu'l-Bahá's rented apartment and Lua was with Juliet there again on the 15th. Lua was again with ʻAbdu'l-Bahá for a New York Peace Society meeting and in the coverage Lua was singled out as a "disciple" of ʻAbdu'l-Bahá.

Lua was visible again a few days later in the delegation with ʻAbdu'l-Bahá pictured attending the Lake Mohonk Conference on International Arbitration, echoes of which appeared variously over the coming week or so in various states. While those echoes were spreading around, on May 19 Lua was with ʻAbdu'l-Bahá at a church, and later for ʻAbdu'l-Bahá's talk at Howard Colby Ives' "Brotherhood Church" who was particularly impressed by the attention Lua paid seeing the talk. Toward the end of May Lua commented that she then not seen ʻAbdul-Bahá for 2 days and together Lua and Juliet spoke of seeking martyrdom.

In early June Lua was among those with ʻAbdu'l-Bahá traveling a bit in New York. A week later at a meeting with Lua, Maxwell and Thompson, ʻAbdu'l-Bahá described their respective hearts as tender, kind, and boiling.^{Kindle:6034} Later Lua gave a talk while ʻAbdu'l-Bahá was traveling; she mentioned a proof of the work of Baháʼu'lláh's guidance being that 70 diverse pilgrims came together at one meeting she was in. June 18 there was a filming of a Baháʼí gathering to hear a talk by ʻAbdu'l-Bahá held at the home of the MacNutts and Lua is visible among the entourage. The next day was the day ʻAbdu'l-Bahá named Lua as the "Herald of the Covenant" after sitting for some time for a painting by Juliet Thompson. This act promoted Lua “and by extension, women, to the highest echelon of honor and responsibility in the Faith, in contrast to the secondary positions usually held by women in traditional religious organizations" and was "reminiscent of the preeminence of Tahirih, the ‘Bugle’ or ’Trumpet’ and remover of ‘veils’ in her proclamation of the Báb’s mission.” Lua was then sent to audience of 125 people to "proclaim the Covenant” and ʻAbdu'l-Bahá followed with a talk about the uniqueness of the Baháʼí situation; this talk was confirmed and published along with all supplemental scriptural texts to that date about the Baháʼí covenant and naming New York as the 'City of the Covenant'.

On June 29 Lua sought an excuse with Juliet to see ʻAbdu'l-Bahá then staying in Montclair. After arriving, on June 30 ʻAbdu'l-Bahá told her she is to be sent to California; but rather than be separated, Juliet tells a story that Lua walked in poison ivy, and then was cured by eating fruit chosen by ʻAbdul-Bahá so that she could go. Lua left July 11, arrived by the 19th giving a talk where she used a prophecy of the sun rising in the West for the dawn of the 'Center of the Covenant' announcement. Lua was among the Baháʼís present in San Francisco August 10 with a group sending a telegram to ʻAbdu'l-Bahá then in Dublin, New Hampshire. ʻAbdu'l-Bahá was on a train already on the way to California when the news came of the death of Thornton Chase in Los Angeles; he immediately changed his plans and went to Los Angeles to visit Chase's grave. When ʻAbdu'l-Bahá did come to San Francisco a few days later Lua had made arrangements for him to speak for a number of venues starting with Stanford University. Lua was with him visiting the Golden Gate Park in early October. A picture was taken October 12 of ʻAbdu'l-Bahá with Lua at the edge during the visit to Goodall's home. Lua remained in California teaching various classes as ʻAbdu'l-Bahá went back east and eventually left America.

Lua had been feeling unwell for some time and on arriving in Chicago in spring 1913 came under the care of a doctor. Still she took up the invitation of Rev. Albert Vail in Champaign for a presentation on the religion for his Unity Club in March. She was accompanied by the doctor's wife. In Chicago Lua was staying in the doctor's own home and advised to have an operation which was held in early April. The doctor refused payment and she felt her ill-feeling gone. The doctor had known Lua some 20 years timing back to the early 1890s.

=== India ===
In April 1913 Lua was mentioned in the Will settlement of Helen Ellis Cole in New York. On July 10 Lua was on the German SS Princess Irene coming from DC and arrived in Port Said July 23, where she waited and learned of the opportunity of service of going to India. ʻAbdu'l-Bahá met with her in August in Ramleh, Egypt, and a report of a tablet was published in Star of the West in October which was a set of exhortations of the basis of the goal of being of unwavering service using both Táhirih and himself as examples. Lua begged ʻAbdu'l-Bahá not to be sent with any man but her husband and hoped to be joined by Isabel Chamberlain though that did not work out. Edward arrived by late September and together they went to the Baháʼ̛í shrines, and spent three weeks in ‘Akká/Haifa before November 13. At some point Martha Root gathered some notes about the preparation of Lua to go to India, retold in 1947, which speaks to various attitudes in response to challenges and opposition. Hellen Goodall aided many of Lua’s travels and established a trust to aid the Getsingers in India administered by contacts in Egypt.^{Kindle:6273}

By early December the Getsingers had arrived in India while ʻAbdu'l-Bahá had returned to Haifa. Jean Stannard went instead of Chamberlain with the Getsingers and Stannard represented the Baháʼís, as Lua fell sick, at the All-India Theistic Conference in Karachi, December 25-9. Lua wrote back of Christian material being useless and proceeding on highlighting general principles and seeking a translator. She was back and forth between Bombay (modern Mombai) and Surat along the western coast of India in January and February, staying in the home of N K. Vakil, the first Baháʼí of Hindu background, and offering classes and giving talks. Vakil went on pilgrimage at the time. One of the visits to Surat there was a visit to see a Nawab (Muslim ruler) of Sachin. Come March the normal heat of the year was already getting to her though she still received guests at her home, and traveled to Jhalrapatan well inland and then Chhatrapur on the east coast of India. She developed a fever again in March, but was able again to travel to meet with the Maharaja of Jhalawar in April, one of the points of contact ʻAbdu'l-Bahá had outlined from the beginning, and with whom she developed a correspondence and friendship. He became “splendidly sympathetic” to Lua and was a point of reference to other Baháʼí contacts, and often calling her “St. Lua” even in the 1920s in India.

A picture taken with Lua in India has been published online. Wax cylinders of Hindi renditions of Baháʼí scriputres were made but have since been lost. Fareed's disaffection from the religion came to light by the summer of 1914 - apparently he had been asking Baháʼís for money for years and been censured by ʻAbdu'l-Bahá and the rumors of he and Lua were circulating since February.

By June Edward was traveling separately from Lua but communicating via telegram; Lua was feeling alone, yet he was unwilling to travel with her and she was running out of money and unable to pay for a trip. When Edward left her, local Baháʼís offered to pay her way to Haifa in July. Edward's leaving her affected her health in August into October; during which she had lost 28 lbs. There was a threat of arrest because of his German background as WWI approached while in British India.^{Kindle:6273} Lua was concerned what Edward might be saying about her in late October while feeling alone: “it was the last human tie to break and he broke it ruthlessly" she wrote in a letter. Biographer Kathryn Jewett Hogenson marks Edward’s leaving India as the end of their marriage.^{Kindle:6291} She obtained a passport from the American Consul in Bombay in early November.

Such service was part the overall effort of major sequences of action managed by ʻAbdu'l-Bahá for the first travels to begin to spread the religion around the world: of Dreyfus and Barney on a world tour, the Getsingers and Stannard to India, and Agnes Alexander and others to Japan.

=== Palestine ===
Lua left India November 17, 1914, and arrived in Ottoman Palestine December 3. At some point Lua joined in some relief assistance with a Persian Baháʼí doctor as a nurse serving in a Druze village.

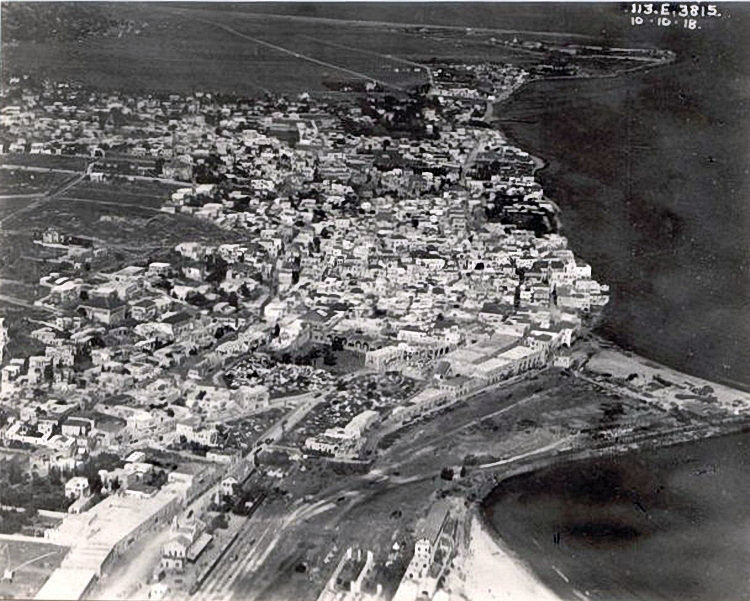
Historical images of Haifa, 1918

Edward had been in America and returned to Haifa to provide money for food relief during the war before America's involvement but ʻAbdu'l-Bahá had to refuse because of the high suspicion and threats in the area. Edward also consulted about his marriage while in Haifa. including January 26 - February 5, 1915. A meeting had been held in Haifa seeking reconciliation between Edward and Lua. He felt she had indulged in backbiting about him and that he had personally suffered “because I had no wife” based on the diagnosis/comments of doctor. He felt Lua had a limitation of the spirit which she must overcome - “I can not figure it out any other way."(than she must have had an affair - to understand what had happened in her behavior with respect to him.) Unexamined, whatever the truth of the details and points of view of Edward and Lua, but present in modern literature are cases of changes in marital intimacy following major changes in religious feeling. Edward filled for a divorce from Lua which was then published in the newspapers in late July, 1915, repeating into August. Edward was then asked about how this relief fund was dispersed rather than returned and became very upset over the demands asked of him from donars and continued to complain of the questioning for two years and about which “may have been the final blow which determined Edward to sever all ties with Lua" in the judgement of Lua's biographer. Still Lua didn’t know he contemplated divorce. Lua says when Edward left he did not want her to return with him because of some Baháʼís were being unfriendly to her. But she did not consider this a rupture in their marriage.

Lua gained an understanding while in Haifa that this was a time of trials in the world for the next few years including interpretations of prophecies of Jesus, Bahá’u'lláh and ʻAbdu'i-Bahá. There was also a threatened arrest of ʻAbdu'l-Bahá in February, 1915.

In some quarters her independence and styles were criticized among Baháʼís and called her a "Magdalene" and her status became conflated with the failure of Fareed to remain faithful to the Baháʼí covenant. The only legal option for divorce in DC at the time was because of adultery and was that way until 1935. Edward tried to minimize publicity of seeking a divorce even to moving to other areas that allowed other means of divorce but there too delays mounted and he felt an urge to return and be done with it. In letters of Edward in America he maintained she had not been “a wife to me” for nine years, her lacking “affinity” to do so he said she said.

ʻAbdu'l-Bahá left to be reviewed and possibly arrested about the time Lua left Palestine - she was accompanied to the boat by Shoghi Effendi and others. Lua left Haifa August 30, 1915, carrying a tablet authored August 27 speaking of her work in India and respect given her role as "Herald of the Covenant" addressed to the Baháʼís of America. She left for Crete on the American USS Des Moines along with 290 other evacuees and then left to Port Said arriving mid-September, on a small Greek vessel.

Wartime communications from Palestine to America were very limited for ʻAbdu'l-Bahá to attempt to address the wave of concerns in America while Lua wrote her own in part updating the American Baháʼís on her work in India, the situation in the Holy Land and wartime issues and the need for the spread of the religion at this critical time.

=== Egypt ===
On September 13 Lua applied for an emergency passport in Cairo under her married name. Her occupation was "Lecturer" and she intending to return to America on a scale of months vs years. Circa September 25 news of the filing for divorce reached her. She was deeply hurt by the accusations and sent multiple copies of ʻAbdu'l-Bahá’s latest tablet confirming his high respect for efforts and character. The Haifa Relief Fund process Edward had tried to accomplish was still a mess as well.

At the time Lua was still calling ʻAbdu'l-Bahá superlative names like “Ancient Beauty” as well as the more normative "Center of the Covenant". A letter of September 26 to Louise Waite pointed out a network of leading women in America who were to have assistants - Mrs. Goodall assisted by the Ralstons and Mrs. Cooper for the West Coast, Mrs. Krug assisted by the Kinneys for New York, Parsons, assisted by Charles Mason Remey, for DC and True for Chicago to be assisted by Dr. Zia Bagdadi. This practice is no longer used. Lua was also noted and lionized among Baháʼís and had her own spiritual ’sisters’, ‘brothers’, and ‘children’ and many became leaders of the community.

==== Defended ====
ʻAbdu'l-Bahá was Lua's first public defender. Crosson observes:"ʻAbdu'l Bahá’s(sic) letter drew support from newly formed North American institutions, and they devoted a whole issue of the magazine Star of the West to Lua and the Covenant. Although repeatedly warned of the corrosive effects on unity of gossip, fault-finding and backbiting, which ʻAbdu'l Bahá(sic) called 'the worst human quality,' the community still struggled to overcome this cultural penchant." "… in spite of ʻAbdu’l Bahá’s(sic) pronouncements, the negative western cultural associations of Mary Magdalene with illicit sexuality were difficult to completely erase, as was betrayed in the language Lua Getsinger used in a 1915 letter reacting to her husband’s hurtful charge of infidelity. Speaking of herself, Lua writes: 'Even had she [Lua] been a Magdalene – who is he [Edward Getsinger] to stone her after her Lord and the one whom he acknowledges as his Lord had forgiven, trusted, and sent her out to herald His name – In the days of Christ all went out ashamed – before Jesus said ‘Neither do I condemn thee’!' As Lua Getsinger’s plaintive statement makes clear, the mythic Baháʼí rehabilitation of Mary Magdalene had profound reverberations for women raised in a patriarchal culture. Accusations of promiscuity represented (and still do, albeit to a lesser degree) female degradation. The negative impacts on women of “Madonna/whore” dichotomies in Judeo-Christian cultures are well documented.” The Baháʼís rose towards honoring Mary Magdalene and of Lua. Crosson continues: "Thus, the metamorphosis of Mary Magdalene’s image loomed larger for women who became Baháʼís in the 'progressive' era, because her heroization symbolically repudiated injustices done to women on the basis of their sexuality by patriarchal religion. Lua Getsinger, in another letter to the same friend, reclaimed her spiritual and feminine power in the face of her accuser, after she received ʻAbdu'l Bahá’s(sic) support. Having begged Bahá’u'lláh for martyrdom and severance from all else save God, she writes: 'He is now answering me! I rejoice and thank Him. I long for suffering until I am purged from all else save His Holy Spirit and then I may sacrifice my life in His Path made so narrow and perfect by the Feet of His beloved His Son – His Covenant through which I have learned the fear of God – which has liberated me from the fear of any man!'" Indeed Mary Magdalene is now "one of the 'most revered women in the Bahaʼi hermeneutic' inasmuch as ʻAbdu'l Bahá(sic) made more references to Mary Magdalene than to any other female historical figure."

Baháʼí institutions supported Lua in October. The next issue of Star of the West was all about her and the Baháʼí covenant with extracts of letters including three repeats of the August 27 tablet of ʻAbdu'l-Bahá - a copy of the Persian text, a photograph of the original, and the translation. Comments by the editor team were added:

"In the light of the foregoing, further comment on our part is unnecessary. 'Peace be upon those who follow guidance.ʼ
It is evident that those who are favored with a written word of approval from ʻAbdu'l-Bahá should receive every consideration. Lua Getsinger has been thus favored; 'she is worthy of love.'

In a letter of the period Lua referred to this as a test which for her was the "last of the Dark Night for my soul" and speculating of a "last long journey". Still she was concerned that Edward’s "good motives" not cause him harm over the troubles of the Haifa Relief Effort that failed. She moved from Port Said to Cairo in October and remained among Baháʼís but fell ill with bronchitis and neuralgia. Martha Root was there and heard Lua had gotten word ʻAbdu'l-Bahá was well by November 24. December 5 there was mention of Lua meeting and speaking to young Baháʼís in Cairo who understood English.

==== Died ====
Eight weeks before her death, in a March 7, 1916, letter sent to a lifelong friend she said "I am very much afraid when I have learned my final lesson which the desert has to teach me--my footsteps will be turned in another direction--and years may pass ere we meet again--even if we ever should in this world." A letter in April says: "… I am sure until the last day of our lives we will be learning lessons, for this world is a school, from which we graduate only when we leave it. I shall be so glad when the last day comes, and the school is forever (so far as I am concerned) dismissed. His will, not mine, be done!" "One night (it was the 2nd of May) she awoke with a severe pain in her heart. She called the family, who telephoned for a doctor. But before his arrival she passed into the other world after uttering three times, 'Ya-Baha-el-Abha.’"

Lua Getsinger died unexpectedly of heart failure on the night of May 1–2, 1916, at the age of forty-three. Communiques from the US Embassy in Egypt with her sister Hebe and, as named in the documentation, her husband Edward followed. She had two trunks of personal effects including clothing, letters, note books, and manuscripts and together with left over monies she had, doctor and funeral expenses were covered by friends.

== Memorialization and commentary ==
ʻAbdu'l-Bahá was informed 4 months later, delayed by war time communications, around September 1916. He wrote a prayer of visitation which says in part:

O Lord, Grant her a palace in the neighbourhood of Thy Most Great Mercy; cause her to dwell in the gardens of Thy paradise, the Most High, illumine her countenance with the effulgence of Thy good-pleasure in the Kingdom of Thy Glory …

It mentions her difficulties: “….through the difficulties that she endured in Thy Path, her very flesh and bones were melted, diseases and sicknesses attacked her, her frail body failed her, her nerves and muscles weakened their functions and her heart became the target of conflicting ailments.…” A quote reported to be put on her original gravestone was written by ʻAbdu'l-Bahá: "Verily, verily, the maid-servant of God, Lua, while serving in the Path of God and being attracted to His Breaths, abandoned this world, soared towards the Supreme Concourse and attained to the countenance of her Lord in the Kingdom of Names” though this is only mentioned in a second hand letter and not verified. Meanwhile Martha Root encountered a cousin of Lua's in Pernambuco, Brazil.

A biographical review of Lua was published in Star of the West, mostly based on Edward’s positive comments, by the editors which was followed by a tribute from May Maxwell and she says: "Then I saw no longer the bruised and broken reed trodden and crushed to earth, whose fragrance shall perfume all regions. I saw the victorious Lua, majestic in her death--the Lua who shall live through all ages--who shall shine from the horizon of eternity upon the world when all the veils which have hidden her today from mortal eyes have been burned away. As Kurat-ul-Ayn[ed - another name for Tahíríh] was the Trumpet of the Dawn in the Orient in the Day of Bahaʼu'llah, so Lua Aurora shall wave forever and ever the Banner of the Dawn in the Day of the Covenant." Modern scholarship on Lua continues seeing her as a Táhirih model of a crusader, "not afraid to speak out in the face of the approbation of family, neighbours, and authority figures." The National Baháʼí Convention of America in 1917 held a memorial service for Lua with May Maxwell noting her effect on many many many Baháʼís, and another was held at the end of the 1919 convention that announced the Tablets of the Divine Plan about promulgating the religion around the world. Maxwell was also a direct influence on several more people including Hands of the Cause Agnes Alexander, William Sutherland Maxwell, and Mason Remey,^{Kindle:4732-4855} and Ethel Rosenberg.^{Kindle:4437}

ʻAbdu'l-Bahá further commented on Lua in a tablet to the MacNutts July 1919 that was published in November 1920:

"Yet, praise be to God! not even a single soul among the Friends wavered. The violators in America do nothing but flatter, seduce and show a love that is insincere. Consider what they did to poor Lua and how unfaithful they have been to her!"

The Bosch family, long close friends of Lua, visited her gravesite towards the end of January, 1922. She was reinterred from a Christian cemetery to a Baháʼí cemetery in December 1942 just before the 20th anniversary of her death, and later a revised mausoleum was raised and shared with Mírzá Abu'l-Faḍl, her designated father figure in the community.

On March 29, 1954, Shoghi Effendi, as then head of the religion, mentioned Lua in a short list of eight women “in the Abha Kingdom” who had laid down their lives far from home.

Successive biographical works have been published since. In 1971 a 4 page article on Lua was published in Bahá'í News. In 1973 a “charming yet slender” book partially about Lua was published co-written by Hand of the Cause William Sears. A review of her meeting with the Shah in Paris was published in 1974 written by Hand of the Cause Abu'l-Qásim Faizi. A biographical collection of letters to and from Lua was published in 1997. A one page bio on Lua, plus mention of her in other bios of women of Bábí-Baháʼí history, was published in 1999 in curriculum materials for the religion. Lua was one of the subjects of some plays. One was produced in the context of the second Baháʼí World Congress held in 1992. Another was produced as part of a 1998 thesis in Canadian Studies mentioning her in the context of two Baháʼí women speaking in spring 1910. Lua's life was portrayed in an article of a children's magazine of the religion in 2016 still available online.

Lua was among the prominent women of the religion in biographies like Martha Root, Marion Jack and others. Like Root, Lua was remarked on for her extensive traveling, public speaking, and carrying on diplomatic initiatives.

Promoting the historical accomplishments of women has often highlighted a common sense of suffering being a significant motivator for the women but Selena M. Crosson points out for Baháʼí women it has been “their high levels of bonding and intimacy seem to be based primarily on their adherence to their new faith, common millennial ideals, and shared religious language” and can be compared with other communities of women. Baháʼí women’s activities as non-professionalized missionaries (true in general for men and women,) were atypical compared to other advances of women: that Baháʼí women would exemplify new social expectations for women, including paid employment and philanthropy, while avoiding the political route to advancement. See also Baháʼí Faith and gender equality.

Lua is among women seen as ones "who dedicated their lives to service of the Faith, mainly outside of the domestic realm, emerged as heroic Baháʼí paradigms. This positioned these women within the globalizing Baháʼí Faith as attainable modern western female religious exemplars, reinforcing women’s leadership roles.” "This inspiring picture of Lua Getsinger as a warrior woman works in the realm of heroic Baháʼí myth-building on several levels. First, for Baháʼís, Lua presents a clear parallel to Táhiríh."

"In the Baháʼí community, the heroic myths of May Maxwell, Martha Root, Lua Getsinger and their associates were very modern: these are ordinary, flawed, frail or timid women who are transformed by extraordinary circumstances, and their own mettle. They providentially discover a new, nearly unknown millennial faith, which they believe holds in its grasp the fate of the world, and become its champions. Through a series of tests, they exhibit, by overcoming various challenges, a previously unknown strength of character. Their stories, as heroic myths are meant to, inspire other initiates to higher devotion and increased efforts to accomplish their herculean task, building a new global World Order. This quest helps them to move beyond personal and gender barriers to experience a metamorphosis in their personal and collective identities, discovering new capacities and competencies. In the early Baháʼí narratives, these women are often attributed some special qualities, mainly a 'searching' soul and an intuitive knowledge of and sensitivity to the spiritual realm, often revealed through dreams and visions." "As with Lua Getsinger, in most accounts of May Maxwell, a dichotomy of strength and fragility exists; her ephemeral presence and physical weakness mask a spiritually robust woman with great internal fortitude. The mix of “feminine” delicacy and spiritual potency makes her mythology malleable. She was able to be many things to many people.”

Another motif among the early Baháʼís was being a sense of being “chosen” and tested: a quote reported from the Getsingers and in Edward's pilgrim notes published in Star of the West in 1915 says “In this Day every one must be tested, as the time of the 'chosen ones' to prove their worth is indeed very short…. All who fail to attain to the standard through the tests are relegated to the 'many who are called.'" But this was not an individual salvation being envisioned but an enterprise on a planetary scale.

"In fulfillment of May’s prophecy, Lua Getsinger has arguably become the foremost popular female exemplar in the western Baháʼí community, after Táhiríh herself.” Lua is among a list of graves of women believers were enjoined to visit. "The development of these more culturally accessible western female models conformed to modernist and feminist mythological patterns of heroization. Average, even weak or flawed women (i.e. not men) such as the ailing May Maxwell, the 'timid' Agnes Alexander, and the frumpy, poor, ill Martha Root could, after being providentially 'chosen,' and divinely assisted by the transformative power of the 'new revelation,' arise to save the world. Within the Baháʼí community, this band of women became the première exponents and western exemplars of the Faith. These western female religious paradigms, who exhibited many of the qualities identified with feminist ideals of the self-reliant, independent, self-actualizing, 'modern' woman, acted as inspirational models for their peers and succeeding generations."

"However, like a saint, Lua did not succumb (in community memory, at least) to death. By 1924, she was already 'immortalized' within the Baháʼí community, in part for her prolific spiritual 'mothering'. Mariam Haney attributes Lua’s greatness to sacrifice, writing, '…for among the world's great women there are none who should come nearer receiving honor and distinction than those who in truth share the suffering and sorrows of their fellow human beings, and who offer the sacrifice of their own life that others may live.' Haney interprets Lua’s 'martyrdom' as self-chosen so 'that others may live,' echoing Biblical allusions to sacrifice ransoming spiritual 'life.' In this way, 'martyrdom' becomes thoroughly hybridized as both a physical and a daily lived spiritual condition. By equating Lua Getsinger with Persian martyrs, Haney reverses the Orientalism that Edward said claims portrays eastern men as weak and feminised. In this case, male 'Orientals' set the standards for heroism, and western females, by being compared to them, symbolically acquired stereotypically masculinised attributes like bravery, independence, fortitude and loyalty.”

Biographer Kathryn Jewett Hogenson says:"Indeed, Lua’s contributions to the establishment of the Faith cannot be measured. True, she was impulsive and mischievous, and she never let her head overrule her heart; but her passion and unwavering love for the Faith, coupled with her relentless desire to serve her Lord, overshadowed her more earthly failings. Many were the believers who called her their ‘spiritual motherʼ."^{Kindle:6335}
