= St. Stephen's Episcopal Church (San Luis Obispo, California) =

Episcopal Church in San Luis Obispo, United States

Coordinates: 35.2762°N 120.6636°W

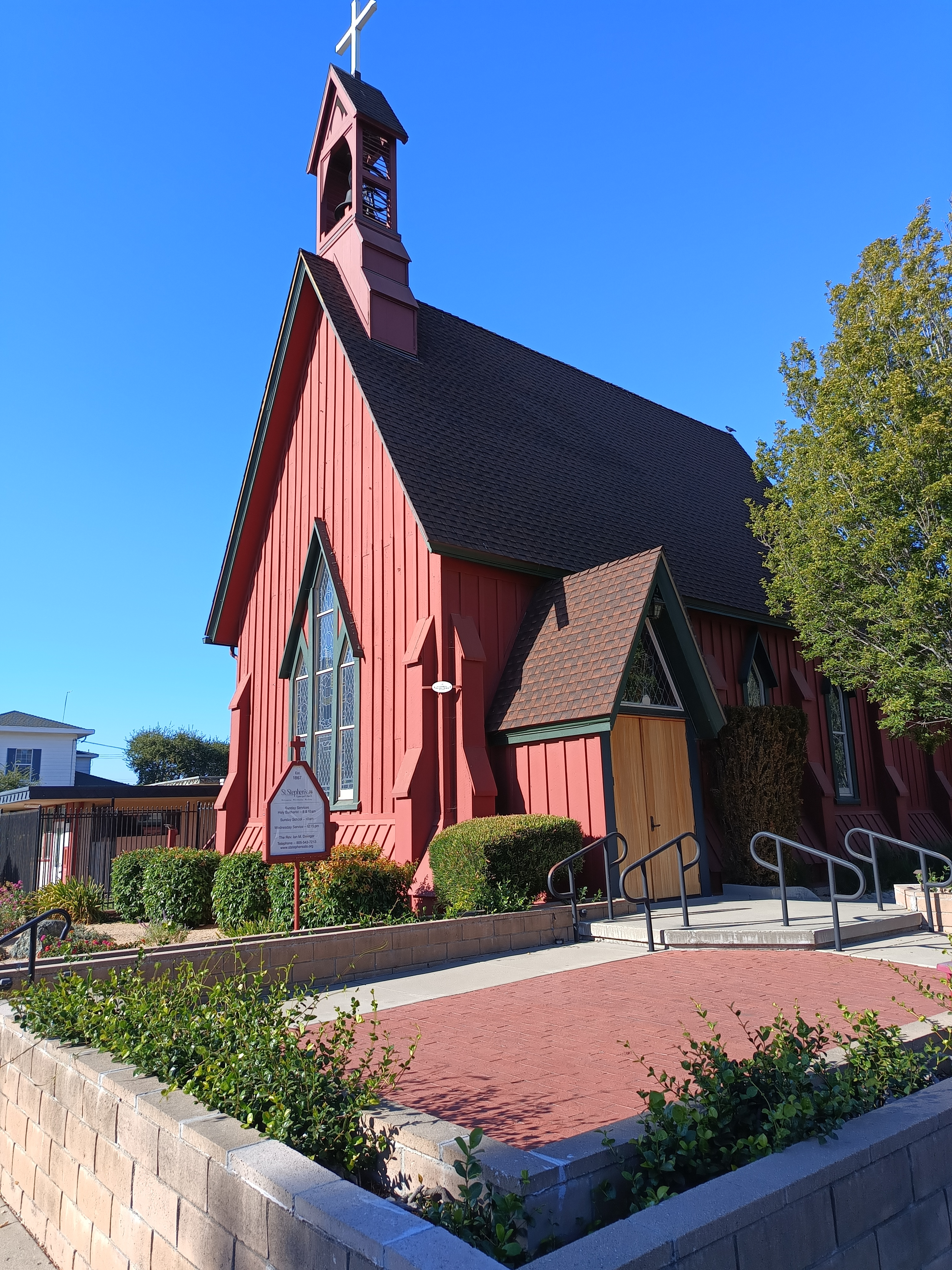
- St. Stephen's Episcopal Church
- St. Stephen's Episcopal Church
- Location: 1344 Nipomo St, San Luis Obispo, CA 93401
- Country: United States
- Denomination: The Episcopal Church (Anglican Communion)
- Website: St. Stephen's Episcopal Church

History
- Founded: 1867
- Founder(s): Dr. William Hays; The Rt. Rev. William Ingraham Kip

Architecture
- Style: Carpenter Gothic
- Years built: 1873

Administration
- Province: VIII
- Diocese: Episcopal Diocese of El Camino Real

Clergy
- Rector: The Rev. Ian M. Delinger

St. Stephen's Episcopal Church is a parish of the Episcopal Church in San Luis Obispo, California. The parish was established in 1867, and the church building was completed shortly thereafter. The current Rector is The Rev. Ian M. Delinger.

== History ==
St. Stephen's Church was founded in 1867 as the first organized Protestant congregation in San Luis Obispo County by local physician Dr. William Hays. The land the church sits on was purchased for 10 dollars in gold coins and the construction of the church building cost 3000 dollars. The church was built from beams of Monterey pine sourced from Cambria, California. During the church's construction, formal services were held at the local Odd Fellows hall, while Sunday school was held in the living room of Dr. Hays' house.

The church was completed in October 1873, built in the Carpenter Gothic architectural style, and was consecrated by Bishop of California William Ingraham Kip. Upon its completion, St. Stephen's was erroneously described as a Methodist church in an article by the San Luis Obispo Tribune. A parish hall known as Ramsden Hall was added in 1911, the church's windows were replaced with stained glass between 1922 and 1930, and the sanctuary was enlarged in 1923. In the 1950s the rectory was demolished and replaced with an education building containing classrooms, offices, a library, and meeting rooms. The church's pipe organ was donated by Phoebe Hearst, mother of William Randolph Hearst, while she was a parishioner, during her time living in Rancho Piedra Blanca.

In 1970, the church was severely damaged by a fire believed to have been caused by defective wiring. The roof of the church was destroyed, but most of the stained glass windows were still intact, the damage to Ramsden Hall and the altar was minimal, and there was no damage to the education building. The church was repaired with the assistance of architect John Stuart and the Bunnell Construction Company.

== See also ==
- List of Anglican churches
- First Presbyterian Church (San Luis Obispo, California)
- Mission San Luis Obispo de Tolosa
