= May Maxwell =

American Baha'i

May Maxwell in Egypt with her daughter Mary, 1923.

Mary "May" Maxwell (née Bolles; born 14 January 1870 in Englewood, New Jersey; died 1 March 1940 in Buenos Aires, Argentina) was an early American member of the Baháʼí Faith.

== Early life ==
Mary Ellis Bolles was born to John Bolles and Mary Martin Bolles, in Englewood, New Jersey. She was nicknamed 'May' to distinguish her from her mother. May was of English ancestry. The Bolles family were distinguished in New York City, owning a successful bank in the city. When she was fourteen May was sent to England to live with her English cousins. For one year May lived in Kensington. May became very spiritually minded; she was given a gift of a Bible in 1885, which she studied and read daily.

As May approached her late teens, her family saw it was the time for her to be married. Phoebe Hearst, who was a close friend of her mother, funded May's extravagant debutante ball. She was 'brought out' in Washington. May was considered a great beauty with a petite figure, blue eyes and long fair hair attracting several suitors who courted her. The rejection of several marriage proposals frustrated her family. She was bought out again into Newport society in the hopes of finding a husband. May fell in love during this period and became engaged, but it was broken off. May plunged into depression, and it was around this time that her health seriously deteriorated.

In late 1894, May moved to Paris with her mother and brother; who was attending the École des Beaux-Arts. May's mother still hoped for her to marry, but May resented the Parisian high society. She went through periods of deep depression and insomnia and even considered entering a convent. In 1897 May lost both her grandmother and cousin whom she was very close to. At 27 May became obsessed with mortality and became bedridden leading to many of her family members believing she was going to die.

== Pilgrimage to Acre ==
In November 1898, Phoebe Hearst, accompanied by her nieces and other Baháʼís like Lua Getsinger, stopped off at Paris before concluding their journey to the East. Hearst was shocked to see 28-year-old May bedridden with the chronic malady which had inflicted her. She invited May to sojourn to the East with her believing the change of air to be conducive to her health. Getsinger also disclosed to May the purpose of the journey; a pilgrimage to visit the head of the Baháʼí religion ʻAbdu'l-Bahá. May arrived in Acre in February 1899. She wrote of the first time she met ʻAbdu'l-Bahá as "of that first meeting; In her memoir An Early Pilgrimage, she recorded: [1, 2]

"Of that first meeting I can remember neither joy nor pain nor anything that I can name. I had been carried suddenly to too great a height; my soul had come in contact with the Divine Spirit; and this force, so pure, so holy, so mighty had overwhelmed me... We could not remove our eyes from His glorious face: we heard all He said; we drank tea with Him at His bidding; but existence seemed suspended, and when He arose and suddenly left us we came back with a start to life: but never again, oh! never again, thank God, to the same life on this earth!"

== As a Baháʼí ==
May returned to Paris and began teaching her new faith and played a significant role in introducing the religion to several people while in Paris. She helped convert several new believers, including Charles Mason Remey, Hippolyte Dreyfus, Laura Barney (Dreyfus), Englishman Thomas Breakwell and Juliet Thompson. On her return five of the younger female pilgrims had a photograph commissioned and sent to ʻAbdu'l-Bahá. On receiving the photograph he wrote a tablet addressed to the five, whom he named the "Five Holy Leaves". She met a close friend of her brother's, William Sutherland Maxwell, a Canadian of Scottish background, and the two married in 1902 in London. William had been introduced to the religion before their marriage but he did not become a Baháʼí until 1909, after meeting ʻAbdu'l-Bahá. The couple had one child, a daughter named Mary.

The couple moved to Montreal, and May set up a Baháʼí center in her home. Prior to 1912, she supported a Children's Court for Montreal, and her efforts were chief in maintaining the Colborne Street Milk Station. In about 1914, she brought a Montessori teacher from New York to their home in Montreal to start the first school of this type in Canada. In Montreal May continued to convert people such as Arthur Armstrong, Rose Henderson and her husband's cousin Martha MacBean. In 1912 ʻAbdu'l-Bahá visited Canada and stayed with the Maxwells. She was an early participant at Green Acre, the first Baháʼí training facility in the United States. In 1927 she was a member of the US and Canada National Spiritual Assembly.

In 1937, her life changed dramatically after her daughter, Mary, was married to Shoghi Effendi, then head of the Baháʼí Faith.

== Death ==
Despite poor health, on January 24, 1940 May chose to leave New York on a steamship to Brazil, ultimately to land in Argentina to teach the Faith with her niece, Jeanne Bolles. She arrived in Buenos Aires on February 27 with elation; however on March 1, May died of a heart attack. Shoghi Effendi gave her the status of martyr and cabled the following: "ʻAbdu'l-Bahá's beloved handmaid, distinguished disciple May Maxwell (is) gathered (into the) glory (of the) Abhá Kingdom. Her earthly life, so rich, eventful, incomparably blessed, (is) worthily ended. To sacred tie her signal services had forged, (the) priceless honor (of a) martyr's death (is) now added. (A) double crown deservedly won. (The) Seven-Year Plan, particularly (the) South American campaign, derive fresh impetus (from the) example (of) her glorious sacrifice. Southern outpost (of) Faith greatly enriched through association (with) her historic resting-place destined remain (a) poignant reminder (of the) resistless march (of the) triumphant army (of) Baháʼu'lláh. Advise believers (of) both Americas (to) hold befitting memorial gathering.".
