= Rúhíyyih Khánum =

Wife of Baháʼí leader Shoghi Effendi

Coordinates: 32°48′52″N 34°59′13″E

Amatu'l-Bahá Rúhíyyih Khánum
- Born: Mary Sutherland Maxwell; 8 August 1910; New York City, United States
- Died: 19 January 2000 (aged 89); Haifa, Israel
- Burial place: Baháʼí World Centre, Haifa, Israel
- Occupation: Hand of the Cause
- Spouse: Shoghi Effendi (m. 1937)
- Parents: William Sutherland Maxwell (father); Mary Ellis Bolles (mother)

Amatu'l-Bahá Rúhíyyih Khánum (born Mary Sutherland Maxwell; 8 August 1910 – 19 January 2000) was an American-born Canadian Hand of the Cause of the Baháʼí Faith. She was the wife of Shoghi Effendi, who, in accordance with the Will and Testament of his grandfather ʻAbdu'l-Bahá, was appointed to the station of Guardian of the Bahá’í Faith. He became the Guardian of the Baháʼí Faith between 1921 and 1957. Appointed as a Hand of the Cause in 1952, her primary responsibility was to expand and protect the global Baháʼí community. In this capacity, she was among the leading Hands of the Cause who, following Effendi's death in 1957, took on the role of ensuring the transfer of the religion's supreme legal authority to the Universal House of Justice, which has governed out of Haifa, Israel, since 1963.

Khánum was born to Canadian architect William Sutherland Maxwell and American spiritualist Mary Ellis Bolles, both Christians who later became Baháʼís. As an adolescent, she embarked on two pilgrimages to Haifa's Baháʼí World Centre, where she first met Effendi, whom she would marry in 1937. Since Effendi died without having any children, she was regarded by many Baháʼís as the last remaining link to his great-grandfather Baháʼu'lláh, who founded the Baháʼí Faith in Iran and the Ottoman Empire in the 19th century.

For much of the latter half of her life, Khánum actively ventured throughout many parts of South America, sub-Saharan Africa, Asia, and the Pacific Islands, where she worked to establish and develop local Baháʼí communities. During this time, she published a number of books and documentaries, and was also officially received by the United Nations and many countries' governments. In 2004, the Canadian Broadcasting Corporation placed her at number 44 on the voters' list of "greatest Canadians" for the television series The Greatest Canadian.

At the age of 89, Khánum died in Haifa and was buried at the Baháʼí World Centre in the city.

== Early life ==
=== North America ===
Khánum was born Mary Sutherland Maxwell in New York City on 8 August 1910. Her father William Sutherland Maxwell was a Canadian of Scottish ancestry (Aberdeen and Jedburgh) from Quebec, and her mother Mary Ellis Bolles was an American of English ancestry from New Jersey. The family lived in Montreal, where her father worked as an architect. In 1912, ʻAbdu'l-Bahá visited Canada from Iran and stayed in the Maxwells' home, where he met the two-year-old Khánum, whom he described as the "essence of sweetness."

Her mother sought to give her an education that was free of the rigidity of the traditional educational methods in the country, and thus established the first Montessori school at their residence. Khánum began reading and writing at a young age and her pastimes included writing poetry, novels, and plays. She was fluent in English, French, German, and Persian. In her youth, she twice visited the Baháʼí World Centre—initially with her mother and again with her mother's friends—aged 15 and 16. It was on these Baháʼí pilgrimages that she first met Shoghi Effendi, who had recently succeeded his grandfather ʻAbdu'l-Bahá as the spiritual head of the Baháʼí Faith.

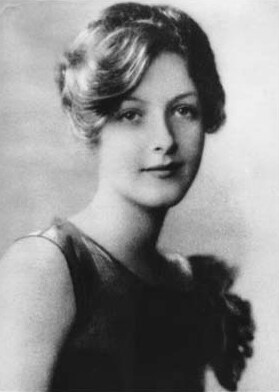
Khánum (Mary) in 1926, the year of her second Baháʼí pilgrimage

In her youth, Khánum was engaged in many Baháʼí activities. At the age of 15, she joined the Executive Committee of the Fellowship of Canadian Youth for Peace. She was also involved in local racial equality conventions, including dances. A spectator, Sadie Oglesby, who became one of the first African American Baháʼís, described her as "sixteen-year-old Mary Maxwell, a beautiful and most refreshing girl to know." By the age of 21, she was elected to the Montreal's Bahá’í Spiritual Assembly.

Considered attractive and a gifted orator by her contemporaries, Khánum quickly established herself as a prominent member of the Baháʼí Faith in North America. She embarked on regular trips around the United States and Canada to propagate the religion. Beginning in 1932, she lectured on The Dawn-Breakers throughout the United States, and in May 1933, during a visit to Washington, D.C., she insisted that all meetings be open to both Blacks and Whites. Khánum also held talks at Howard University, making a concerted effort to connect with African Americans who were interested in the Bahá’í Faith. Additionally, while in her early 20s, she attended a number of official functions with her father in Montreal, meeting dignitaries like the Governor General of Canada at a variety of events, such as the Fifty-Fourth Exhibition of the Royal Canadian Academy.

=== Europe and World War II ===
As a young woman, Khánum had expressed a great desire to learn Spanish. However, her plans to travel to Spain were thwarted by the Spanish Civil War. Instead, in 1935, just two years after Adolf Hitler's rise to power, she chose to live with her cousin in Germany in a move that was endorsed by Effendi, who encouraged her to strengthen the fledgling German Baháʼí community. There, she assimilated into German society, wearing a dirndl and learning to speak the language fluently. Nevertheless, by 1937, the religion had been outlawed by the Nazi regime, which later began persecuting Baháʼís.

During this time, Khánum and her mother accepted an invitation from Effendi to go on another Baháʼí pilgrimage. The two initially planned to travel through the Balkans, but the outbreak of World War II forced them to travel directly to Haifa.

== Marriage ==
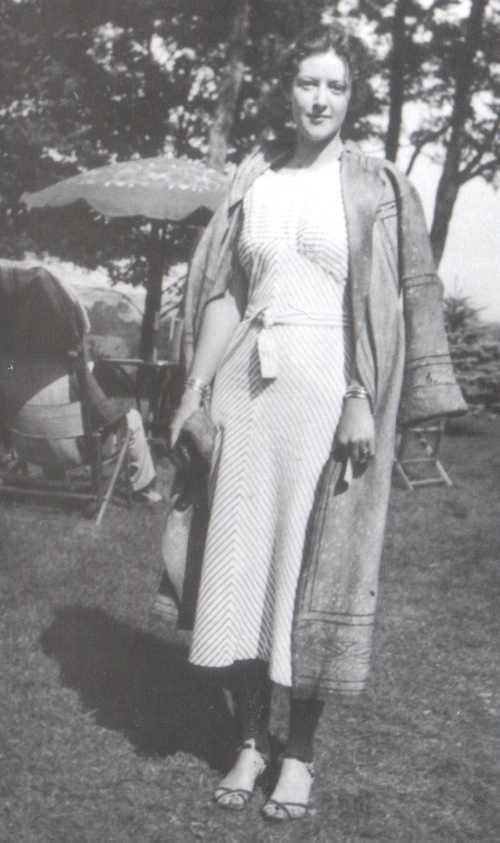
Khánum (Mary) in 1934

Mary had spent extended periods with Shoghi Effendi before their marriage, initially meeting him when she was 12 years old. After a pilgrimage three years later, she maintained constant communication with Shoghi Effendi. In January 1937, Mary and her mother arrived in Haifa, initiating a discreet courtship with Shoghi Effendi. By February, the couple was engaged, and Mary promptly cabled her father to join them in Haifa. On March 24, at the age of 26, Mary married Shoghi Effendi in a simple ceremony. It was during this time that Shoghi Effendi bestowed upon her the title "Amatu'l-Bahá Rúhíyyih Khánum" (Amatu'l-Bahá means "Handmaiden of Glory"). The official announcement of their marriage was cabled to the Baháʼí world by Shoghi Effendi's mother, Ḍíyáʼíyyih:

Announce Assemblies celebration marriage beloved Guardian. Inestimable honour conferred upon handmaid of Baháʼu'lláh Ruhiyyih Khanum Miss Mary Maxwell. Union of East and West proclaimed by Baháʼí Faith cemented. Ziaiyyih mother of Guardian.

As Rúhíyyih was getting used to life in the East, the newlyweds made a trip to Switzerland, and Shoghi Effendi introduced his young bride to his favourite sights in the country. It was initially difficult for her to adjust to her new home and she suffered periods of loneliness and homesickness. With the encouragement of Shoghi Effendi, she studied both the Bible and the Quran and started learning Persian. She later became fluent in the language and was able to deliver talks in Persian. In a letter to her mother a year after her marriage, she wrote that "if anyone asked me what my theme was in life I should say, 'Shoghi Effendi'".

== Later life ==
Almost immediately after their marriage, she served as the Guardian's secretary, and then in 1941 until 1957 she served as Shoghi Effendi's principal secretary in English. In 1951, she was appointed to the International Baháʼí Council, which was an administrative institution of the Baháʼí Faith created as a precursor to the Universal House of Justice to act as a liaison between the Council and Shoghi Effendi. Later on, on March 26, 1952, she was appointed to the office of Hand of the Cause of God – a distinguished rank in service to the religion – for which she attended to issues related to the propagation and protection of the religion.

After Shoghi Effendi died in 1957, she became for Baháʼís the last remaining link to the family of ʻAbdu'l-Bahá, who headed the Faith from 1892 to 1921 and was the eldest son of the Faith's Founder, Baháʼu'lláh.

=== Ministry of the Custodians ===
In 1957, her husband, Shoghi Effendi, died without having appointed a successor. Rúhíyyih Khánum was among the 27 Hands of the Cause who stewarded the religion for the six-year interim, before the Universal House of Justice was scheduled to be elected in 1963. The Hands voted among themselves for nine individuals to work at the Baháʼí World Centre to run the administration of the Faith, a position to which Rúhíyyih Khánum was elected; these nine were designated the Custodians. During this time, she worked on assuring the completion of the ten-year international teaching plan which was launched by Shoghi Effendi in 1953. Upon the election of the Universal House of Justice in 1963, the ending point of Shoghi Effendi's ten-year plan, the nine Hands acting as interim head of the Faith closed their office.

=== Work after Effendi ===
From 1957 until her death, Rúhíyyih Khánum traveled to over 185 countries and territories working with the world's several million Baháʼís. She especially encouraged members of indigenous peoples to participate in the global Baháʼí community. Her travels took her to all the continents and to small islands. Some of her travels involved extended stays. For four years, she traveled for 58,000 kilometers in a Land Rover through sub-Saharan Africa, visiting 34 countries, in 19 of which she was received by the head of state. On another trip, she visited nearly 30 countries in Asia and the Pacific islands during a seven-month span. From January to March 1970, she crossed Africa from east to west, driving 2/3 of the distance herself, visiting many countries' communities, meeting with individuals and institutions, both Baháʼí and civic.

In 1975–6, she travelled by boat through the tributaries of the Amazon River of Brazil and visited the high mountain ranges of Peru and Bolivia. Thirty six tribal groups were visited over a period of six months; the trip was called The Green Light Expedition, which followed Khanum's The Great African Safari. There have also been projects developed from the original expedition – In the Footsteps of the Green Light Expedition and Tear of the Clouds.

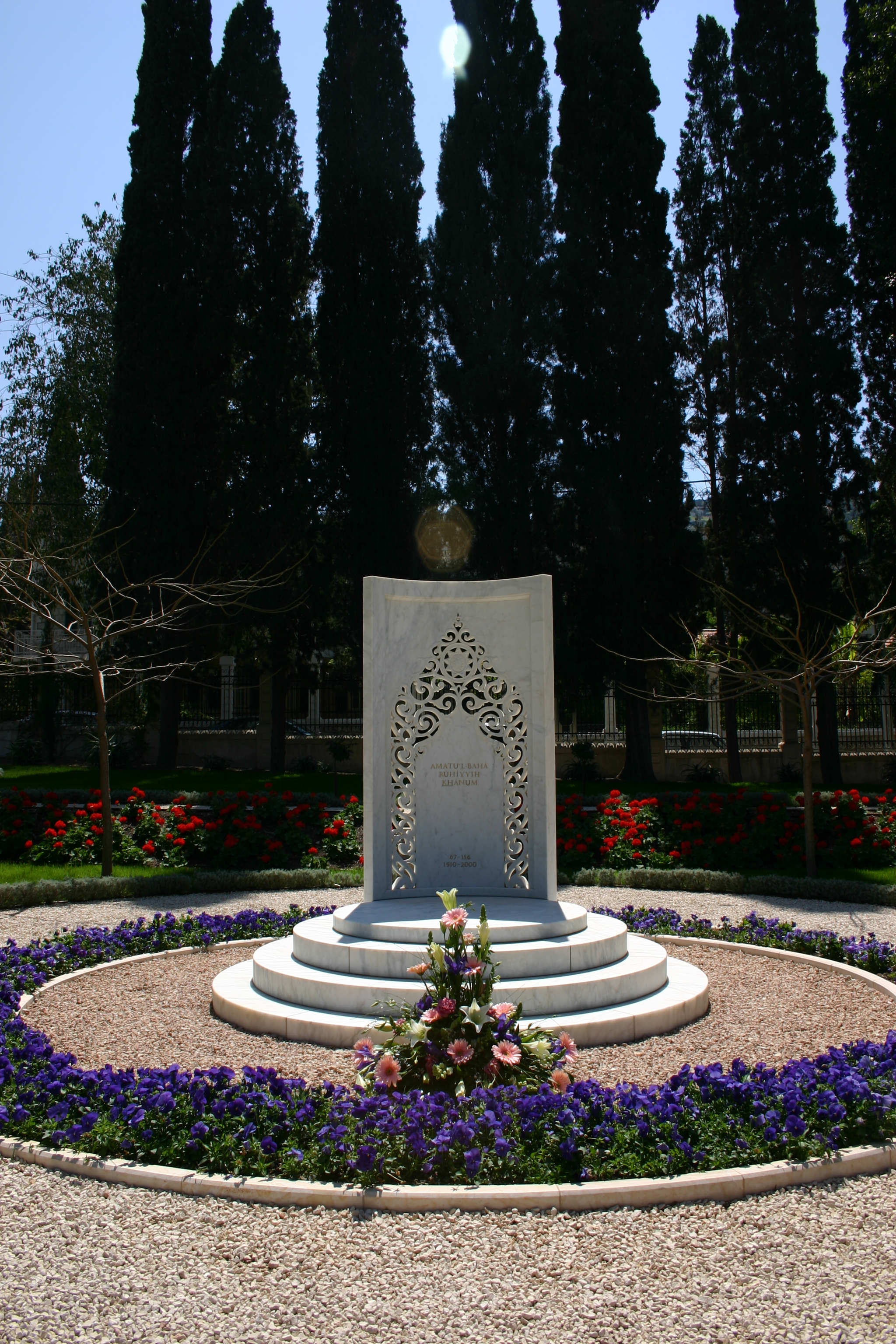
Grave of Khánum at the Baháʼí World Centre in Haifa, Israel, 2005

During her travels, she was received by the following heads of state and government:

- Emperor Haile Selassie of Ethiopia,
- Malietoa Tanumafili II of Western Samoa
- Prime Minister Indira Gandhi of India
- President Félix Houphouët-Boigny of Côte d'Ivoire
- President Carlos Menem of Argentina
- Prime Minister Edward Seaga of Jamaica, and
- Javier Pérez de Cuéllar, Secretary-General of the United Nations.

=== Death ===
Rúhíyyih Khánum died on 19 January 2000 at the age of 89 in Haifa, Israel. She was buried at the Baháʼí World Centre.

== Published works ==
Rúhíyyih Khánum was also an author; she wrote several books including The Priceless Pearl, which is a biography of Shoghi Effendi; Twenty-Five Years of the Guardianship;, Prescription for Living, which discussed the application of spiritual principles to one's life. and The Desire of the World: Materials for the contemplation of God and His Manifestation for this Day. She was also the editor of the book The Ministry of the Custodians. She produced two full-length documentary films: The Green Light Expedition and The Pilgrimage.

== See also ==
- Maxwell International Baháʼí School
