= William Sutherland Maxwell =

Canadian architect (1874–1952)

- Born: 14 November 1874; Montreal, Quebec, Canada
- Died: 25 March 1952 (aged 77); Montreal, Quebec, Canada
- Occupation: Architect
- Spouse: Mary Ellis Bolles (m. 1902; died 1940)
- Children: Mary Maxwell
- Relatives: Edward Maxwell (brother)

William Sutherland Maxwell RCA (November 14, 1874 – March 25, 1952) was a Canadian architect and a Hand of the Cause in the Baháʼí Faith. He was born in Montreal, Quebec, to parents Edward John Maxwell and Johan MacBean.

== Life and career ==
=== Education ===
At the age of 18, after attending the High School of Montreal, he started working for his brother Edward's office in the Sun Life Building in Montreal. In 1895, he left for Boston, where he spent three years in the office of Winslow and Wetherel. In the evenings, he would study at the Boston Architectural Club. There, he met Constant-Désiré Despradelles, Professor of Design at MIT (1892–1912), who exposed him to the Beaux-Arts architecture style.

In 1898, he returned to his brother's office for fifteen months, after which he spent a year and a half in Paris, where he was accepted as a student in the atelier of Jean-Louis Pascal at the École des Beaux-Arts, under whom Despradelles had also studied. Maxwell then returned to Canada in December 1900.

=== Professional life ===
In 1902, he became a partner in his brother's firm. During his time with the firm, it won contracts to design the Commissions for the Nurses Home of the Royal Victoria Hospital in Montreal, the Saskatchewan Legislative Buildings, the Art Association of Montreal (renamed the Montreal Museum of Fine Arts), and the Departmental and Courts Buildings Ottawa in 1907 (unexecuted).

In 1891, he was accepted in the new association of architects. He designed the Board of Trade Building in Montreal, as well as the Saint-Louis and Riverview wings of the Château Frontenac in Quebec City when it was expanded, and the new art gallery in Montreal. Among the many other designs, he also designed important hotels for the Canadian Pacific Railway adjoining their existing stations in Winnipeg and Calgary.

=== As a Baháʼí ===
In Paris, Maxwell had met Mason Remey and Randolph Bolles, who introduced him to the Baháʼí Faith. Later, Maxwell married Bolles' sister Mary Ellis Bolles in London on 8 May 1902. He became a Baháʼí in 1909, after meeting ʻAbdu'l-Bahá, the son of the founder of the Baháʼí Faith. The Maxwells' home in Montreal became a centre of Baháʼí activity in Canada, and in 1912, ʻAbdu'l-Bahá visited their home. The Maxwells would frequently visit the Baháʼí World Centre in Haifa, Palestine (current day Israel).

In 1937, the Maxwells' daughter, Mary Maxwell, married Shoghi Effendi, then head of the Baháʼí Faith. After Maxwell's wife died in 1940, he left for Haifa, where he remained throughout the Second World War. While in Haifa, he designed the arcade and superstructure of the Shrine of the Báb, one of the holiest places for members of the Baháʼí Faith.

For this work and for his long devotion to the Baháʼí Faith, he was recognized as a Hand of the Cause of God by Shoghi Effendi in December 1951. After his death in 1952, the south door of the Shrine of the Báb was named after him. Maxwell had returned to Montreal the year before he died, and he was buried there on 29 March 1952 in Mount Royal Cemetery.

== Professional associations ==
In 1908, he became a Councillor of the Province of Quebec Association of Architects, in 1909 an Associate of the Royal Canadian Academy, in 1913 President of the Arts Club, in 1914 President of the Province of Quebec Association of Architects and an Academician of the Royal Canadian Academy, in 1928 a Fellow of the Royal Institute of British Architects (RIBA), in 1935 President of the Royal Architectural Institute of Canada (RAIC) and finally in 1938 Vice-President of the Royal Canadian Academy.
