= The Subjection of Women =

1869 essay by John Stuart Mill

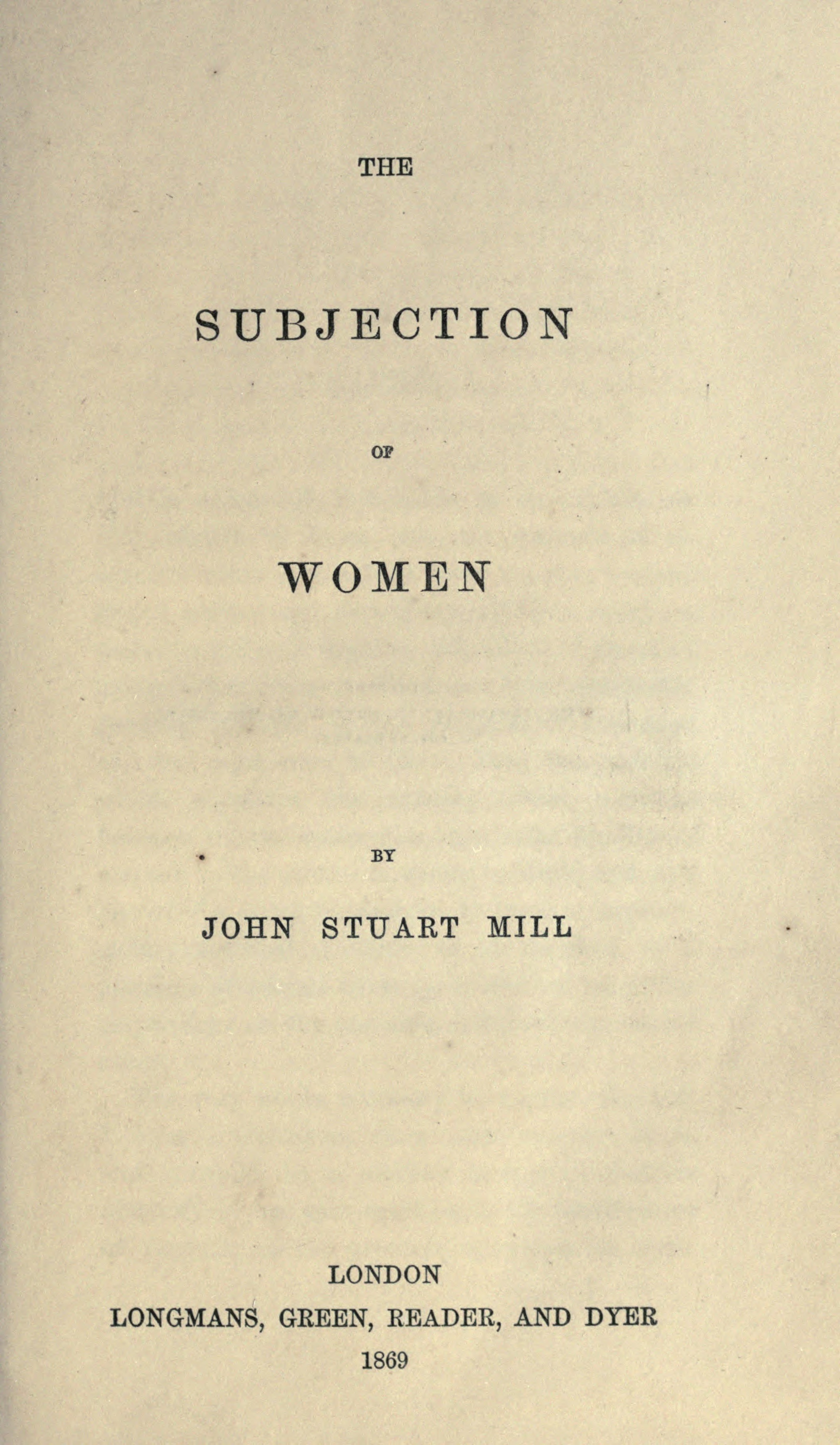
- The title page of first print of Subjection of Women, 1869
- Author: John Stuart Mill and Harriet Taylor Mill
- Language: English
- Publisher: Longmans, Green, Reader, and Dyer
- Publication date: 1869
- Publication place: United Kingdom
- Media type: Print

The Subjection of Women is an essay by English philosopher, political economist and civil servant John Stuart Mill published in 1869, with ideas he developed jointly with his wife Harriet Taylor Mill.

J.S. Mill submitted the finished manuscript of their collaborative work On Liberty (1859) soon after her untimely death in late 1858, and then continued work on The Subjection of Women until its completion in 1861.

Harriet Taylor Mill wrote an earlier essay The Enfranchisement of Women, published under her own name in The Westminster Review in 1851, which covered much of the same ground, and seems to use similar language for many of its arguments.

At the time of its publication, the essay's argument for equality between the sexes was an affront to European conventional norms regarding the status of men and women.

== History and context ==
In his autobiography, Mill describes his indebtedness to his wife, and his daughter Helen Taylor for the creation of The Subjection of Women:

As ultimately published it was enriched with some important ideas of my daughter's and some passages of her writing. But all that is most striking and profound in what was written by me belongs to my wife, coming from the fund of thought that had been made common to us both by our innumerable conversations and discussions on a topic that filled so large a place in our minds.

While scholars generally agree that John Stuart Mill was the sole author, it is also noted that some of the arguments are similar to Harriet Taylor Mill's essay The Enfranchisement of Women, which was published in 1851.

Mill was convinced that the moral and intellectual advancement of humankind would result in greater happiness for everybody. He asserted that the higher pleasures of the intellect yielded far greater happiness than the lower pleasure of the senses. He conceived of human beings as morally and intellectually capable of being educated and civilised. Mill believed everyone should have the right to vote, with the only exceptions being barbarians and uneducated people.

Mill argues that people should be able to vote to defend their own rights and to learn to stand on their two feet, morally and intellectually. This argument is applied to both men and women. Mill often used his position as a member of Parliament to demand the vote for women, a controversial position for the time.

In Mill's time a woman was generally subject to the whims of her husband or father due to social norms which said women were both physically and mentally less able than men and therefore needed to be "taken care of". Contributing to this view were both hierarchical religious views of men and women within the family and social theories based on biological determinism. The archetype of the ideal woman as mother, wife and homemaker was a powerful idea in 19th century society.

At the time of writing, Mill recognized that he was going against the common views of society and was aware that he would be forced to back up his claims persistently. Mill argued that the inequality of women was a relic from the past, when "might was right," but it had no place in the modern world. Mill saw that having effectively half the human race unable to contribute to society outside of the home was a hindrance to human development.

... [T]he legal subordination of one sex to another – is wrong in itself, and now one of the chief hindrances to human improvement; and that it ought to be replaced by a system of perfect equality, admitting no power and privilege on the one side, nor disability on the other.

== Arguments ==
Mill attacks the argument that women are naturally worse at some things than men and should, therefore, be discouraged or forbidden from doing them. He says that we simply don't know what women are capable of, because we have never let them try – one cannot make an authoritative statement without evidence. We can't stop women from trying things because they might not be able to do them. An argument based on speculative physiology is just that, speculation.

The anxiety of mankind to intervene on behalf of nature...is an altogether unnecessary solicitude. What women by nature cannot do, it is quite superfluous to forbid them from doing.

In this, men are contradicting themselves because they say women cannot do an activity and want to stop them from doing it. Here Mill suggests that men are admitting that women are capable of doing the activity, but that men do not want them to do so.

Whether women can do them or not must be found out in practice. In reality, we don't know what women's nature is, because it is so wrapped up in how they have been raised. Mill suggests we should test out what women can and can't do – experiment.

I deny that any one knows or can know, the nature of the two sexes, as long as they have only been seen in their present relation to one another. Until conditions of equality exist, no one can possibly assess the natural differences between women and men, distorted as they have been. What is natural to the two sexes can only be found out by allowing both to develop and use their faculties freely.

Women are brought up to act as if they were weak, emotional, docile – a traditional prejudice. If we tried equality, we would see that there were benefits for individual women. They would be free of the unhappiness of being told what to do by men. And there would be benefits for society at large – it would double the mass of mental faculties available for the higher service of humanity. The ideas and potential of half the population would be liberated, producing a great effect on human development.

Mill's essay is utilitarian in nature on three counts: The immediate greater good, the enrichment of society, and individual development.

If society really wanted to discover what is truly natural in gender relations, Mill argued, it should establish a free market for all of the services women perform, ensuring a fair economic return for their contributions to the general welfare. Only then would their practical choices be likely to reflect their genuine interests and abilities.

Mill felt that the emancipation and education of women would have positive benefits for men also. The stimulus of female competition and companionship of equally educated persons would result in the greater intellectual development of all. He stressed the insidious effects of the constant companionship of an uneducated wife or husband. Mill felt that men and women married to follow customs and that the relation between them was a purely domestic one. By emancipating women, Mill believed, they would be better able to connect on an intellectual level with their husbands, thereby improving relationships.

Mill attacks marriage laws, which he likens to the slavery of women, "there remain no legal slaves, save the mistress of every house." He alludes to the subjection of women becoming redundant as slavery did before it. He also argues for the need for reforms of marriage legislation whereby it is reduced to a business agreement, placing no restrictions on either party. Among these proposals are the changing of inheritance laws to allow women to keep their own property, and allowing women to work outside the home, gaining independent financial stability.

Again the issue of women's suffrage is raised. Women make up half of the population, thus they also have a right to a vote since political policies affect women too. He theorises that most men will vote for those MPs who will subordinate women, therefore women must be allowed to vote to protect their own interests.

Under whatever conditions, and within whatever limits, men are admitted to the suffrage, there is not a shadow of justification for not admitting women under the same.

Mill felt that even in societies as unequal as England and Europe that one could already find evidence that when given a chance women could excel. He pointed to such English queens as Elizabeth I, or Victoria, or the French patriot, Joan of Arc. If given the chance women would excel in other arenas and they should be given the opportunity to try.

Mill was not just a theorist; he actively campaigned for women's rights as an MP and was the president of the National Society for Women's Suffrage.

== Conclusions ==
The way Mill interpreted subjects over time changed. For many years Mill was seen as an inconsistent philosopher, writing on a number of separate issues. Consistency in his approach is based on utilitarianism, and the good of society.

=== Utilitarianism ===
Nothing should be ruled out because it is just "wrong" or because no one has done it in the past. When we are considering our policies, we should seek the greatest happiness of the greatest number. This leads to attacks on conventional views. If you wish to make something illegal, you need to prove what harm is being done. Individuals know their own interests best.

=== Progress of society ===
The greatest good is understood in a very broad sense to be the moral and intellectual developments of society. Different societies are at different stages of development or civilisation. Different solutions may be required for them. What matters is how we encourage them to advance further. We can say the same for individuals. Mill has a quite specific idea of individual progress: (1) employing higher faculties; (2) moral development, with people placing narrow self-interest behind them.

=== Individual self-reliance ===
We are independent, capable of change and of being rational. Individual liberty provides the best route to moral development. As we develop, we are able to govern ourselves, make our own decisions, and not to be dependent on what anyone else tells us to do. Democracy is a form of self-dependence. This means:

1. Personal liberty: As long as we do not harm others, we should be able to express our own natures, and experiment with our lives
2. Liberty to govern our own affairs: Civilized people are increasingly able to make their own decisions, and protect their own rights. Representative government is also a useful way of getting us to think about the common good.
3. Liberty for women as well as men: All of Mill's arguments apply to both men and women. Previous ideas about the different natures of men and women have never been properly tested. Women can participate in determining their own affairs too.

== See also ==
- On Liberty
- Gender equality
- Feminism
- Women's rights
