= British pet massacre =

Mass killing of pets in 1939

The British pet massacre was an event in 1939 in which an estimated 750,000 cats and dogs, a quarter of England's pet population, were euthanized due to widespread fear among owners that they would not be able to care for their animals during wartime.

The incident was recognized as unnecessary almost immediately after it occurred, stemming from social panic over the impending war, social conflicts on the role of pets, and people seeking a way to feel like they were contributing to the war effort, rather than any sort of actual necessity. A government pamphlet advising pet owners on wartime animal care provided some encouragement for the killing, noting euthanasia an option for people unable to take their pets with them when evacuating.

== Background ==
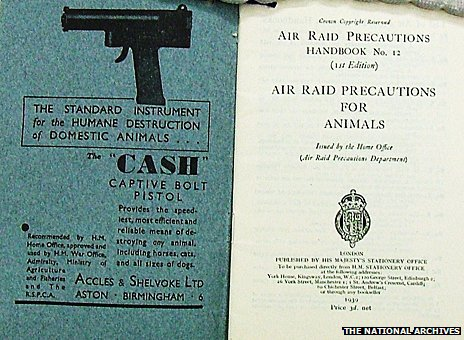
Advice to animal owners

During World War I, abandoned feral pets in London had become a major issue. In 1939, the British government, seeking to avoid a repeat of this, formed the National Air Raid Precautions Animals Committee (NARPAC) to decide what to do with pets before the war broke out. The committee was worried that when people evacuated, they might leave their pets behind. In response to that fear, NARPAC published a pamphlet titled "Advice to Animal Owners." NARPAC's messaging was primarily focused on evacuation, suggesting moving pets from the big cities and into the countryside; but a line at the end noted that "if you cannot place them in the care of neighbours, it really is kindest to have them destroyed."

== Incident ==
When Neville Chamberlain announced on 3 September 1939 that Britain had declared war with Germany, many pet owners took their pets to pet surgery clinics and animal homes to have them put down. Many veterinarian groups such as the People's Dispensary for Sick Animals (PDSA) and the Royal Society for the Prevention of Cruelty to Animals (RSPCA) were against these drastic measures, but their hospitals were still flooded with pet owners in the first few days. PDSA founder Maria Dickin reported: "Our technical officers called upon to perform this unhappy duty will never forget the tragedy of those days." Hilda Kean wrote that lines for London clinics stretched a half mile. The event triggered a shortage of chloroform and a waste management challenge.

The panic that led to the mass-euthanasia was groundless; there was no shortage of supplies, the German bombing was months away, and none of the fears that had led to it were ever realized. Writing in The Great Cat and Dog Massacre, historian Hilda Kean says that the killings were a reaction against previous experiences with feral pets during World War I, but notes that another of the causes of the killings was boredom; the mass euthanasia provided a way for ordinary citizens to feel like they were doing something to contribute to the war effort.

A year later, when London was bombed in September 1940, even more pet owners rushed to kill their pets. "People were worried about the threat of bombing and food shortages and felt it inappropriate to have the 'luxury' of a pet during wartime".

Battersea Dogs Home, against the trend, managed to feed and care for 145,000 dogs during the course of the war and provided a field in Ilford as a pet cemetery, "where about 500,000 animals were buried, many from the first week of the war". A famous opponent of pet culling was Nina Douglas-Hamilton, Duchess of Hamilton, a cat lover, who campaigned against the killing and created her own sanctuary in a heated hangar at Ferne.

== Legacy ==
In 2017, historian Hilda Kean published a book about the event called The Great Cat and Dog Massacre.

== Sources ==
- Campbell, Claire (2013). Bonzo's War: Animals Under Fire 1939–1945. Glasgow, Scotland: Little, Brown Book Group. ISBN 978-1-4721-0687-2.
