= Sidney Trist =

English social reformer and journalist (1865–1918)

Sidney Trist MJI
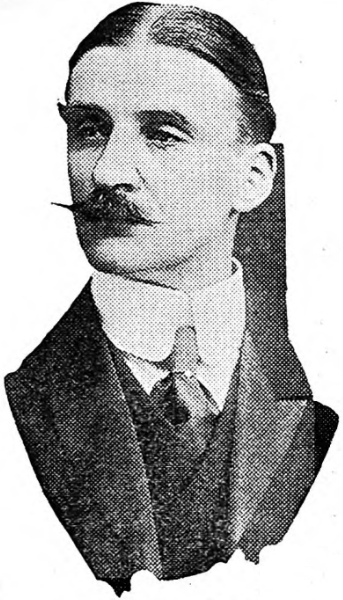
- Trist in 1908
- Born: Sidney George Trist; 1865; Newton Abbot, Devon, England
- Died: 2 December 1918 (aged 53); Wandsworth, London, England
- Resting place: Torquay Cemetery
- Occupations: Social reformer; journalist; editor
- Years active: c. 1894–1918
- Notable work: The Under Dog (1913)
- Spouse: Florence Mogg (m. 1893)
- Children: 4

Signature
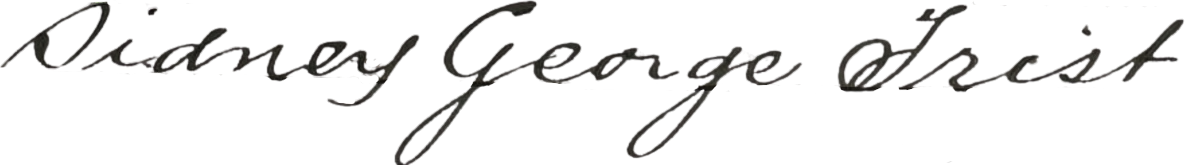

Sidney George Trist MJI (1865 – 2 December 1918) was an English social reformer, journalist, and editor. He was active in the movements for animal welfare, vegetarianism, as well as those opposing vivisection and vaccination. Trist edited several animal welfare periodicals, including The Animal World, The Animals' Friend, and The Animals' Guardian. He served as secretary of the London Anti-Vivisection Society and was a committee member of Battersea Dogs' Home.

Trist wrote and edited pamphlets and books including A Birds-Eye View of a Great Question (1894), Birds and Beasts Within Our Gates (1901), and the illustrated essay collection The Under Dog (1913). Later scholars have discussed his use of visual material in animal advocacy, and in 2017 Hilda Kean dedicated The Great Cat and Dog Massacre to him.

== Biography ==
=== Early life ===
Sidney George Trist was born in Newton Abbot, Devon, in the third quarter of 1865. His father was George Dyer Trist of Torquay. He later lived in Wandsworth, London.

=== Career ===
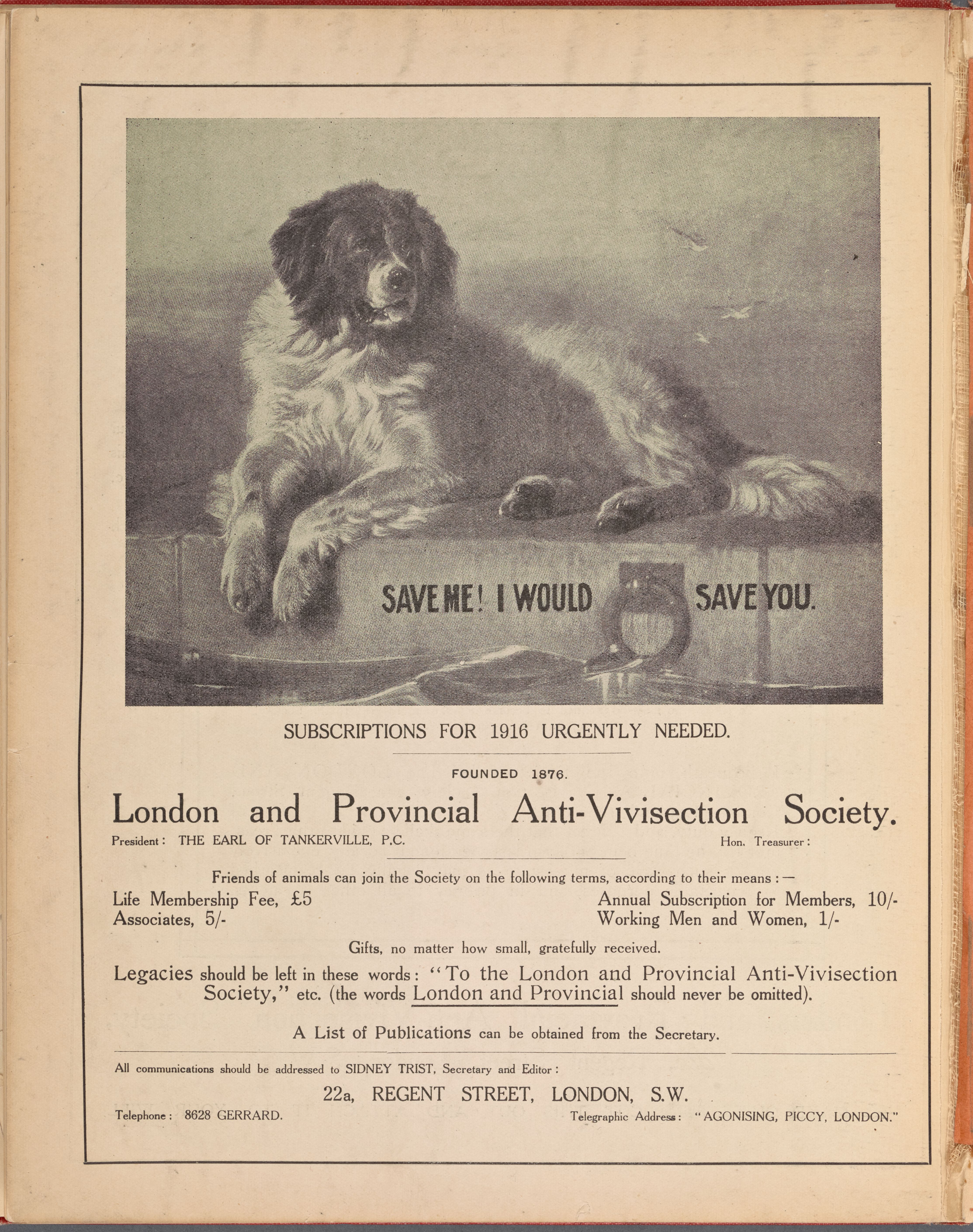
Back cover of the October 1914 issue of The Animals' Guardian

==== Early activism and pamphlets ====
Trist began his public career as an anti-vivisection campaigner and pamphleteer. In 1894, he published his first tract, A Birds-Eye View of a Great Question, which argued against vivisection.

Trist later issued several pamphlets critical of vaccination, particularly the rabies vaccine. These included Pasteurism Discredited and A Rational Cure for Hydrophobia. Other works from this period included The Danger to Hospital Patients in the Practice of Vivisection and A Cloud of Witnesses.

Mark Twain wrote a letter to Trist in 1899 condemning vivisection. Trist circulated the letter in the press and arranged for copies to be printed as a pamphlet by the London Anti-Vivisection Society.

In 1903, Trist spoke at an anti-vivisection meeting with members of the Church Anti-Vivisection League. He also spoke at the Fourth Triennial International Congress of the World League Against Vivisection, held at Caxton Hall.

==== Editorial and organisational roles ====
Trist edited the animal welfare periodicals The Animal World and The Animals' Friend. He was also secretary of the London Anti-Vivisection Society, later the London and Provincial Anti-Vivisection Society, and editor of its publication, The Animals' Guardian.

Trist was later elected to the committee of Battersea Dogs' Home, where he, according to Hilda Kean, "ensured that its policy of never selling any dog to a vivisector was maintained".

Trist's advocacy of vegetarianism in the journals he edited alienated some anti-vivisectionists, who considered his position too radical.

==== Books and collaborations ====
In 1901, Trist published Birds and Beasts Within Our Gates: A Book for Animal Lovers. In 1904, he published Dog Stories, which included works by Émile Zola and an introduction by Jerome K. Jerome. Trist also wrote the preface to Albert Leffingwell's The Vivisection Controversy in 1908.

In 1911, when 16 bishops and other clergy joined the pro-vivisection Research Defence Society, Trist criticised their decision in a 5,000-word open letter. The letter used imagery of Christ in a laboratory to condemn their position.

==== The Under Dog and final works ====
In 1913, Trist published The Under Dog, an illustrated collection of essays on the treatment of animals by humans. In its introduction, he wrote that the essays were intended to "expose to the eyes of humanity the naked horrors which abound in their midst, and to which they are either blind or indifferent". The book was reviewed in several newspapers. In the same year, he published Tell Me a Story, a collection of animal-themed fiction by various authors.

=== Personal life and death ===
Trist married Florence Mogg on 28 October 1893 at Holy Trinity, Wandsworth. They had four children, three sons and one daughter.

Trist died on 2 December 1918 at a nursing home in Wandsworth, aged 53. He was buried on 6 December at Torquay Cemetery, Devon.

== Legacy ==
J. Keri Cronin states that Trist recognised the role of visual education in advocacy and made illustrations a prominent feature of his publications.

The historian Hilda Kean dedicated her 2017 book The Great Cat and Dog Massacre to Trist.

== Publications ==
=== Author ===
- A Birds-Eye View of a Great Question (1894)
- Pasteurism Discredited: What Scientific and Medical Witnesses Assert (1895)
- A Rational Cure for Hydrophobia: Buissonism versus Pasteurism: A Contrast and a Moral (1896)
- The Danger to Hospital Patients in the Practice of Vivisection (1896)
- A Cloud of Witnesses (c. 1899)

=== Editor ===
- The Animal World
- The Animals' Friend
- The Animals' Guardian
- Dog Stories (introduction by Jerome K. Jerome; 1904)
- Birds and Beasts Within Our Gates: A Book for Animal Lovers (1901)
- The Under Dog: A Series of Papers by Various Authors on the Wrongs Suffered by Animals at the Hands of Man (1913)
- Tell Me a Story (1913)
