= Douglas S. S. Steuart =

British mining engineer

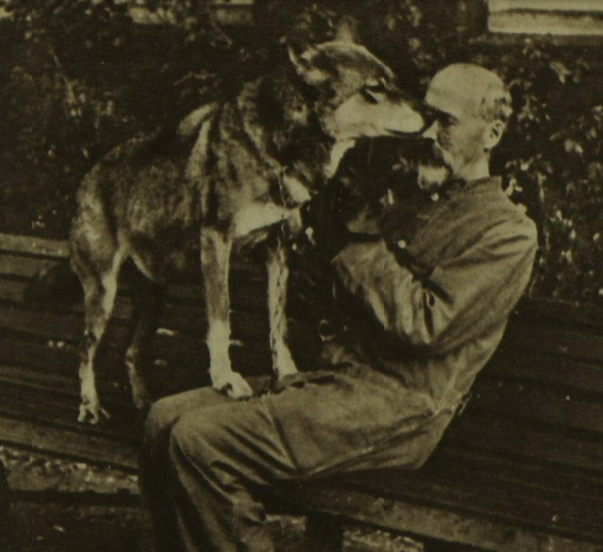
- Steuart with Lassie in 1934
- Born: Douglas Stuart Spens Steuart; 20 April 1872
- Died: 15 July 1949 (aged 77); Perth
- Occupation: Mining engineer

Douglas Stuart Spens Steuart (20 April 1872 – 15 July 1949) was a British mining engineer, author and animal welfare worker.

== Career ==
Steuart worked as a mining engineer in South Africa in 1898 and 1899. He was a member of the Geological Society of South Africa and the Chemical and Metallurgical Society of South Africa. He resided in Pretoria.

He was a member of the Institution of Mining Engineers. In 1899, he authored "The mineral wealth of Zoutpansberg: the Murchison range gold-belt" in the Transactions of the Institution of Mining Engineers.

In 1908, he was living in Cornwall as a consultant engineer and was the director of a company in Boscaswell. In 1913, he authored The Metalliferous Deposits Of Cornwall And Devon. Steuart was a Fellow of the Geological Society of London. He was also a Fellow of the Chemical Society.

He married Mary Rutland. His son, David Steuart was artistic director of Perth Theatre.

== Animal welfare ==
Steuart became known as the "wolf man" as he was known to have tamed savage wolves and made friends with the wolves at London Zoo. He was the only person apart from the keeper that had close contact with the wolves at the London Zoo. Steuart exercised the wolves and walked them within the grounds of the zoo on a light chain. He became friends with Lassie, Kazan and Orloff who liked to "nuzzle close to him, laying their noses on his knees". Lassie, the mother of the wolves became ill after her arrival at the zoo. Steuart sat with Lassie for several days and nights and nursed her back to health in her sanatorium cage. The wolves trusted Steuart and let him play games with them. He commented that "wolves are just like human beings, very intelligent and lovable when you get to know them. I can talk to them, understand them, and have absolute confidence in their friendship".

He spoke about his friendship with wolves at lectures hosted by the RSPCA. In total, Steuart counted 69 wolves as his pets throughout his life. He was on the executive council of the Animal Defence and Anti-Vivisection Society.

== Death ==
Steuart lived with his wife in Perth for the last eight years of his life. He died at Bridge of Earn Hospital, aged 77.

== Selected publications ==
- The Metalliferous Deposits Of Cornwall And Devon (1913)
- A Wolf-Cub's Tale (1947)
- The Wolf-Man's Story (1947)
- The World Of Tomorrow, And Other Anti-War Poems (1948)
- The Warning Vision (1949)
