= Torquay Cemetery =

Cemetery in Devon, England

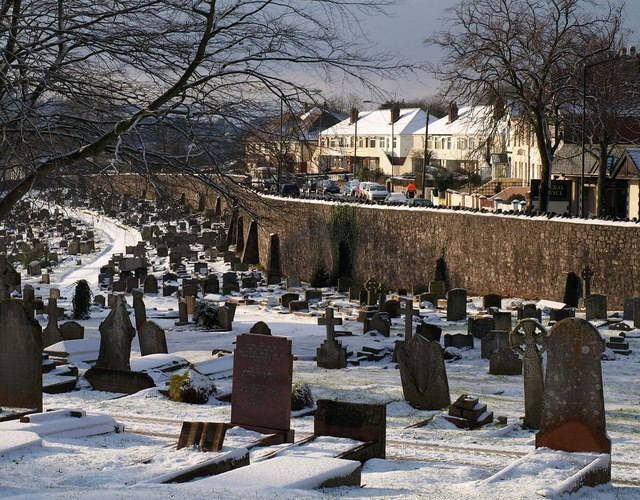
- Part of the northern section of the cemetery
- Interactive map of Torquay Cemetery

Details
- Established: 1852
- Location: Torquay
- Country: England
- Coordinates: 50.483550°N 3.544753°W
- Website: https://www.torquaycrematorium.co.uk/

Torquay Cemetery, also known as Barton Road Cemetery, is a burial ground located in the town of Torquay, Devon, England. The first interment, which took place in the Nonconformist section, was in 1852. The cemetery has been Grade II listed since 2002.

== History ==
Torquay rapidly developed as a seaside resort in the early 19th century so existing graveyards of the parish churches became overcrowded and insufficient for further burials. Hence, in 1851 the local board was petitioned to provide a new burial ground for the town. The Torquay Extra Mural Cemetery Company purchased the current site and laid out the cemetery between 1852 and 1853.

Later in 1853 locals petitioned the then Bishop of Exeter, Henry Phillpotts to consecrate a section in the cemetery for Anglican burials. The first interment was carried out in 1854, but the bishop refused to consecrate the section until it had been separated from the rest of the cemetery by a boundary wall. This was constructed and the consecration carried out in the following year.

Two chapels were constructed in the cemetery, one at the same time as the construction of the boundary wall for the use of Anglicans and another in 1862 for the use of Non-conformists.

The burial ground has been extended several times: in 1869, 1921 and in 1929, when further land was acquired to the north of Hele Road. A crematorium has since been constructed on the latter land.

The site is currently the property of Torbay Council.

== Commonwealth War Graves ==
The cemetery contains 136 burials associated with the First World War and 97 from the Second World War. Thirty two of the First World War graves form a war graves plot in the south-west corner of the original cemetery ground, near a group of New Zealand servicemen's graves, while fifty of the Second World War graves are in a war graves plot in the 1929 extension to the cemetery; the rest of the graves are scattered throughout the cemetery.

== Notable memorials ==
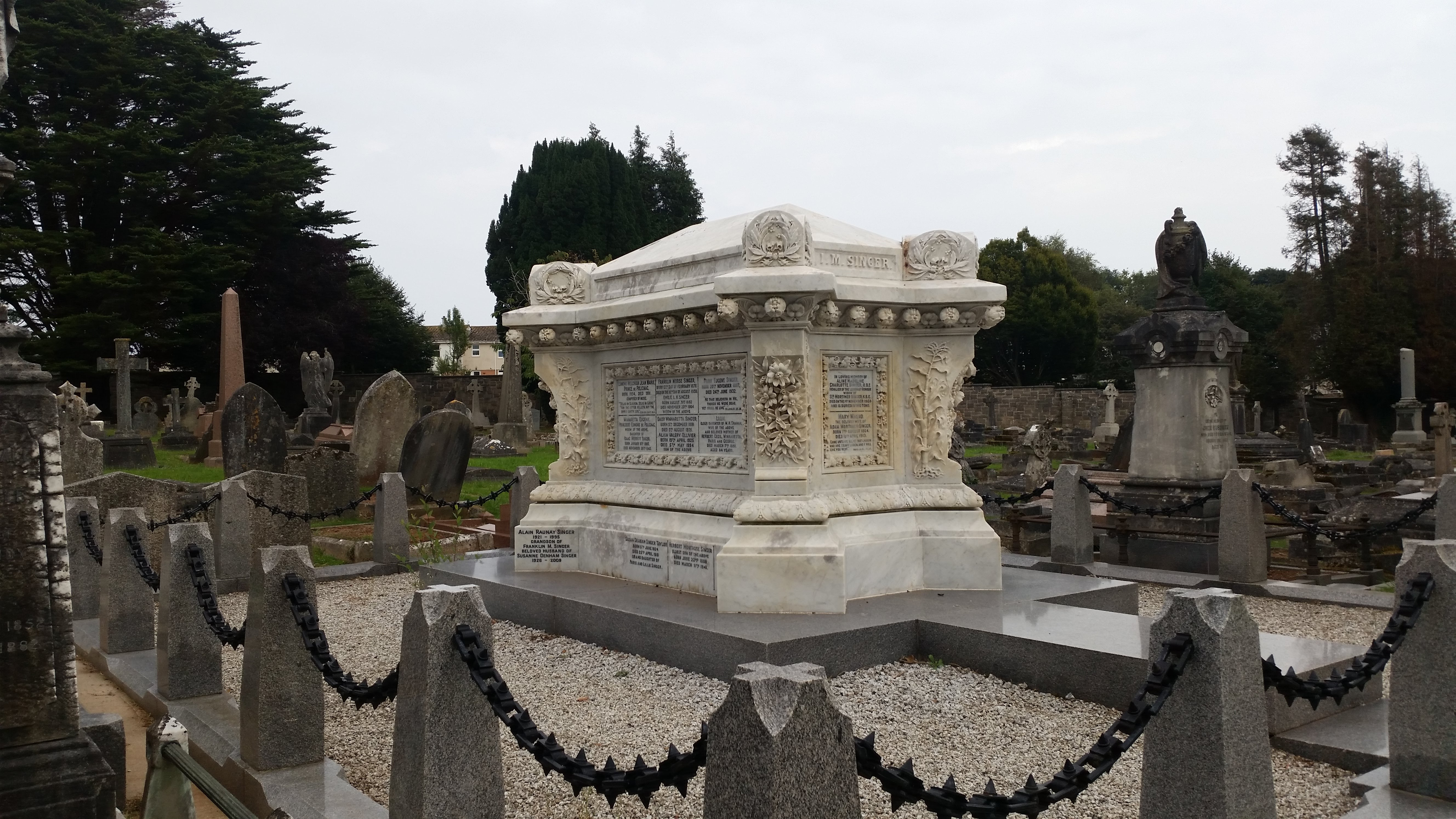
The Singer Family Tomb

There are numerous memorials and burials of notable and famous individuals and families within the cemetery.

These include:

- The Singer family tomb, commemorating numerous individuals including Isaac Merrit Singer (1811–1875) and Sir Mortimer Singer (1863–1929).
- The grave of George Marsden Waterhouse (1824–1906), former Prime Minister of New Zealand.
- Helen Taylor (1831–1907), feminist, suffragist advocate, stepdaughter of John Stuart Mill, is buried here.
- Sidney Trist (1865-1918), animal welfare campaigner, is buried here.
