= Nina Douglas-Hamilton, Duchess of Hamilton =

British peeress and activist (1878–1951)

Her Grace The Duchess of Hamilton
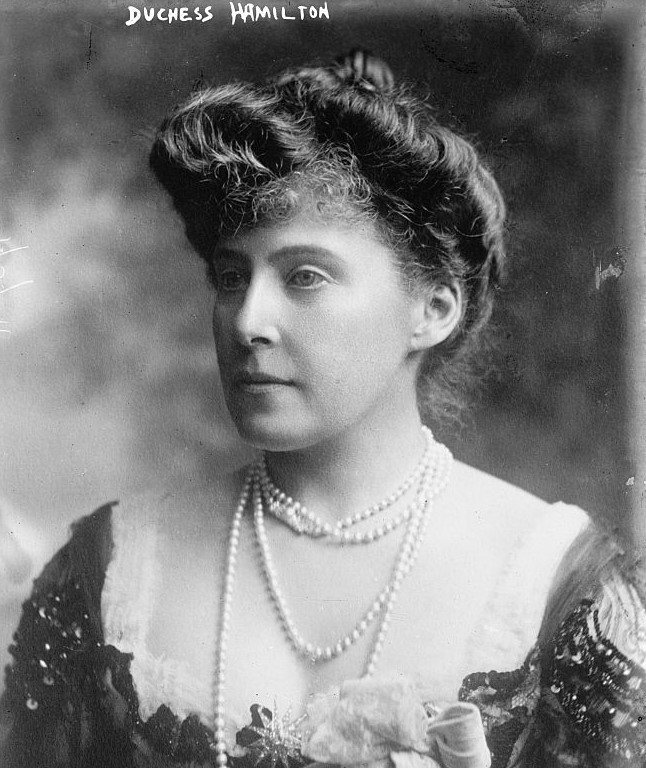
- Photograph of the Duchess of Hamilton from the Library of Congress
- Born: Nina Mary Benita Poore; 13 May 1878; Nether Wallop, Hampshire, England
- Died: 12 January 1951 (aged 72)
- Spouse: Alfred Douglas-Hamilton, 13th Duke of Hamilton (m. 1901; died 1940)
- Children: Douglas Douglas-Hamilton, 14th Duke of Hamilton; Lady Jean Douglas-Hamilton; George Douglas-Hamilton, 10th Earl of Selkirk; Lady Margaret Douglas-Hamilton; Lord Malcolm Douglas-Hamilton; Lord David Douglas-Hamilton; Lady Mairi Nina Douglas-Hamilton
- Parent(s): Major Robert Poore; Juliana Benita Lowry-Corry

Nina Mary Benita Douglas-Hamilton, Duchess of Hamilton (née Nina Mary Benita Poore; 13 May 1878 – 12 January 1951) was an English peeress and animal welfare activist. She campaigned for humane slaughter.

== Early life ==
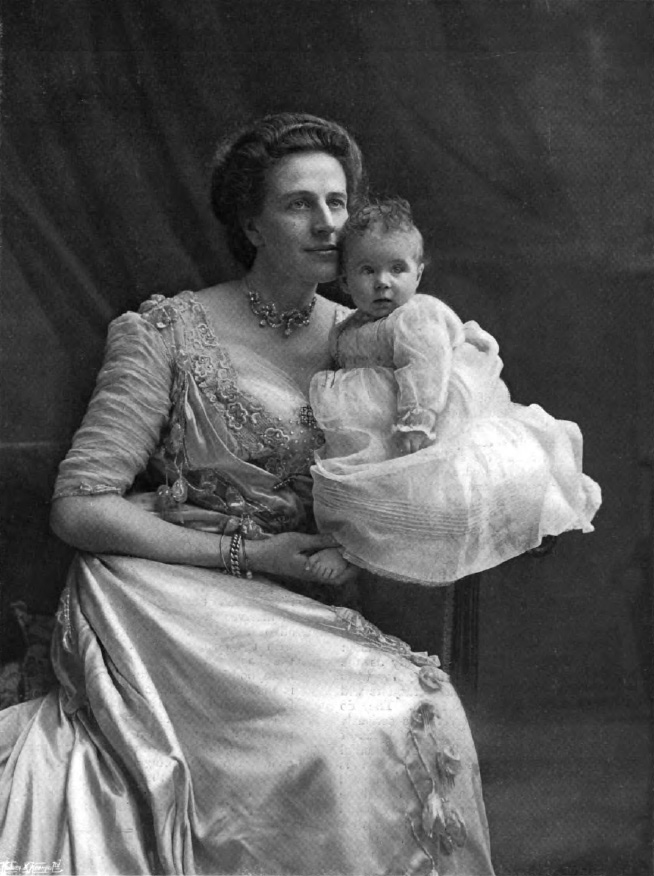
The Duchess of Hamilton with her second daughter, Margaret

Douglas-Hamilton was born on 13 May 1878 in Nether Wallop, Hampshire. She was the youngest daughter of Major Robert Poore and Juliana Benita Lowry-Corry; her mother was a daughter of Rear Admiral Armar Lowry Corry.

== Personal life ==
Three years after her brother, Major Robert Poore, married Flora Douglas-Hamilton, on 4 December 1901 Nina married Flora's brother Alfred Douglas-Hamilton, 13th Duke of Hamilton, at the parish church of Newton Tony, Wiltshire, not far from her parents' home at Winterslow. Together, they were the parents of four sons and three daughters:

- Douglas Douglas-Hamilton, 14th Duke of Hamilton
- Lady Jean Douglas-Hamilton
- George Douglas-Hamilton, 10th Earl of Selkirk
- Lady Margaret Douglas-Hamilton
- Lord Malcolm Douglas-Hamilton
- Lord David Douglas-Hamilton
- Lady Mairi Nina Douglas-Hamilton

Douglas-Hamilton was very proud of her father's work in helping agricultural labourers at Winterslow and was philanthropic towards the group, but kept her gifts secret from all but the recipients. Another gift was sufficient to completely equip and furnish a home for nurses at Bo'ness, West Lothian.

She was a member of the Spiritualists' National Union.

=== Animal welfare ===
Duchess of Hamilton was a co-founder in 1906 of the Animal Defence and Anti-Vivisection Society, with Lizzy Lind af Hageby, a society which set up three veterinary hospitals for horses during World War I, and campaigned against cruelty to animals including the use of animals in war. In 1912, she became a founder of the Scottish Society for the Prevention of Vivisection, which went on to become Advocates for Animals. She also established Ferne Animal Sanctuary, at Ferne House in Dorset, the estate she and her husband owned. She compiled an illustrated book related to the sanctuary called Chronicles of Ferne, published in 1951. At the beginning of the Second World War she opposed pet-culling that was being encouraged by civil defence authorities, that led to what became known as the "British pet massacre" in 1939 and 1940, and caused her to shelter many cats at Ferne.

Douglas-Hamilton was an advocate of humane slaughter. She campaigned for "humane killers" and opposed the use of the knife and poleaxe in the slaughterhouse. In 1925, it was reported that she had witnessed 52 animals being slaughtered in a single afternoon in pursuance of the statutory use of the humane killer.

Douglas-Hamilton was chief promoter of the Animal Defence Society's "Model Humane Abattoir", established in Letchworth in 1928. The humane abattoir received many donations. On creation of the humane abattoir, Douglas-Hamilton commented that "in a civilized country, a slaughterhouse need not be a place of horror, into which animals are driven by kicks and tail-twistings. We ask for mercy to animals, for decency, for cleanliness, and, above all a swift and painless death". Douglas-Hamilton was a vegetarian in her personal life but in 1928 became the head of a humane butcher's shop. In 1931, she stated that "we should ask for the first step to needful reform. This is the use in every slaughterhouse of the mechanically operated humane killer, through which death is made swift and painless".

In May 1950, she opened a maternity home for cats at her Dorset home, where she looked after 40 cats that were mostly strays. In June 1950, she attended an international animal welfare conference at Genova. She was a member of the Council of Justice to Animals (Humane Slaughter Association).

== Death ==
Douglas-Hamilton refused to be operated on for a throat condition due to her opinions on medical research, and when the condition worsened, she refused antibiotics. The condition led to her death on 12 January 1951, at her London house. The funeral service was held in Salisbury Cathedral and the burial was at Berwick St John, near Shaftesbury.

== Legacy ==
A Princess Coronation Class steam locomotive was named after her, which is on static display at the National Railway Museum, York. The Duchess Nina Institute in the village of Quarter, near Hamilton, Scotland, was a gift to the villagers by the Duke and Duchess of Hamilton and was formally opened on 24 September 1910.

== See also ==
- Women and animal advocacy
