= Three Essays on Religion =

1874 book by John Stuart Mill

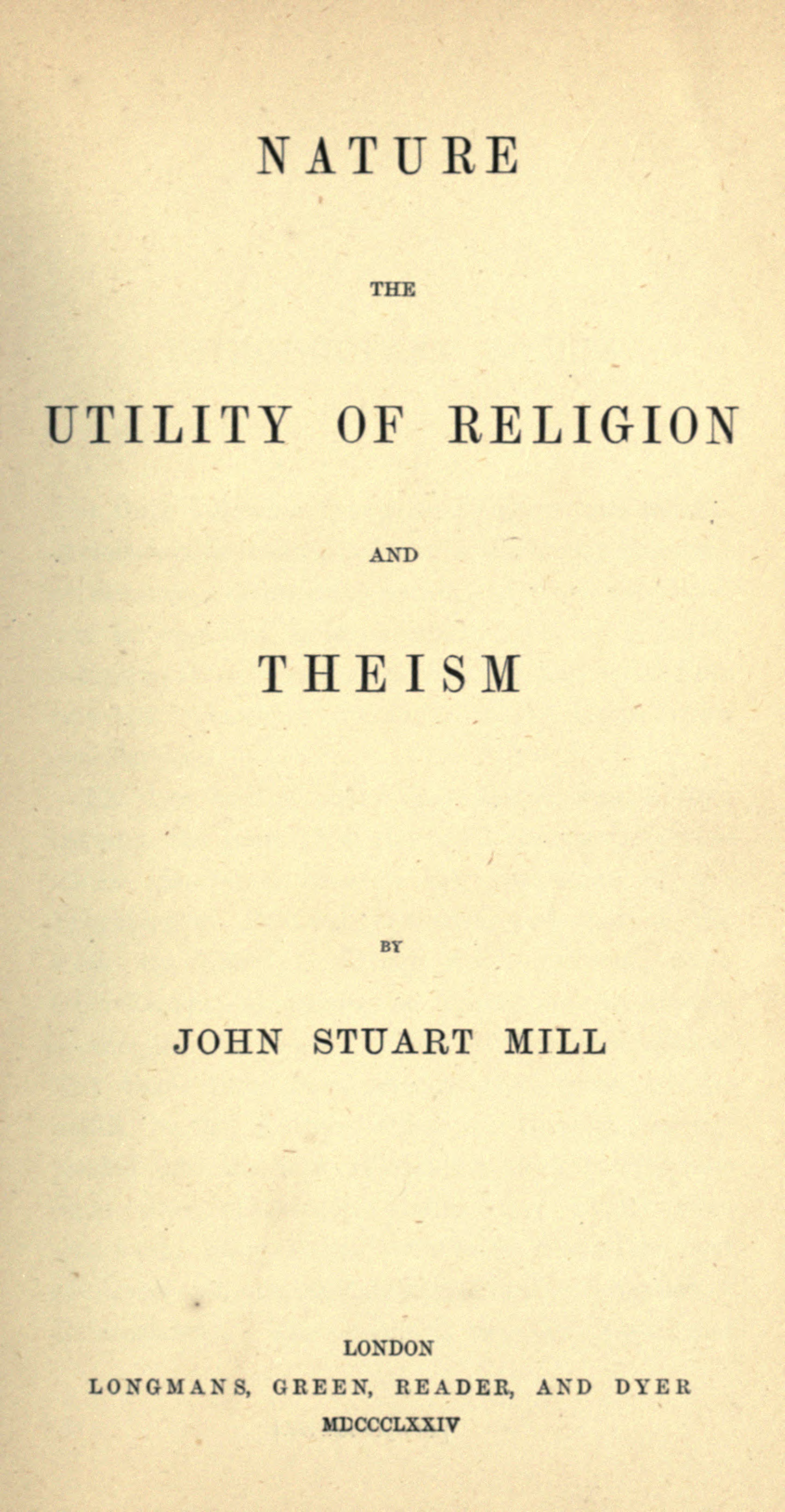
- First edition title page
- Author: John Stuart Mill
- Language: English
- Subjects: Philosophy of religion; Ethics
- Publisher: Longmans, Green, Reader, and Dyer
- Publication date: 1874
- Publication place: United Kingdom of Great Britain and Ireland
- Media type: Print (hardcover)
- Pages: xi + 257
- OCLC: 457883039
- Text: Three Essays on Religion at the Internet Archive

Three Essays on Religion: Nature, the Utility of Religion, and Theism is an 1874 book by the English philosopher John Stuart Mill, published posthumously with an introductory notice by his stepdaughter Helen Taylor. It contains three essays written at different periods of his life: "Nature" and "Utility of Religion", composed between 1850 and 1858, and "Theism", written between 1868 and 1870. The essays examine the relationship between nature, morality, and religious belief. Mill criticises traditional religious doctrines, questions the existence of an omnipotent and benevolent God, and considers a secular "religion of humanity" as an alternative to supernatural religion.

== Essays ==
=== "Nature" ===
In "Nature", Mill rejects the view that the morality of an action can be determined by whether it is natural or unnatural. He distinguishes two meanings of nature: "the entire system of things" and "things as they would be, apart from human intervention". He argues that neither provides a moral standard, since human actions necessarily operate according to natural laws, while the spontaneous course of nature is frequently harmful. Mill maintains that human progress depends on understanding and modifying natural processes rather than imitating them.

Mill describes the suffering caused by natural disasters, disease, starvation, and violence, arguing that many occurrences in nature would be condemned if deliberately caused by humans. He also discusses wild animal suffering, particularly predation, observing that many animals survive by killing and consuming others. He describes nonhuman animals as divided into "devourers and devoured" and subject to numerous dangers against which they cannot defend themselves. Mill uses these examples to challenge the belief that nature demonstrates divine benevolence or provides a model for moral conduct.

=== "Utility of Religion" ===
In "Utility of Religion", Mill examines the social and moral functions of religious belief. He argues that religion can encourage moral conduct and provide ideals towards which individuals may strive, but questions whether these benefits depend on belief in supernatural beings. He proposes a "religion of humanity" in which devotion to human welfare and moral improvement replaces traditional religious obligations.

Mill acknowledges that supernatural religion offers one advantage over a secular alternative: the hope of life after death. Nevertheless, he questions the use of this hope by religious and moral authorities to influence behaviour, and argues that improvements in earthly life could diminish its importance.

=== "Theism" ===
In the final essay, Mill examines arguments for the existence of God, insisting that religious claims should be evaluated according to the same standards of evidence used in scientific inquiry. He considers arguments based on first causes, the general consent of humanity, consciousness, and the apparent design of the natural world.

Mill regards the argument from design as providing some evidence for an intelligent creator, but maintains that the existence of suffering and imperfection in nature is incompatible with the assumption of a deity possessing unlimited power and perfect benevolence. He considers the possibility of a creator whose power is limited, while rejecting claims that the available evidence establishes the existence of an omnipotent God.

Mill also examines the possibility of immortality and divine revelation. Although he finds insufficient evidence to establish the existence of an afterlife, he does not regard it as impossible and acknowledges the consolation that such a belief may provide.
