= Lizzy Lind af Hageby =

Swedish-British feminist (1878–1963)

Lizzy Lind Af Hageby
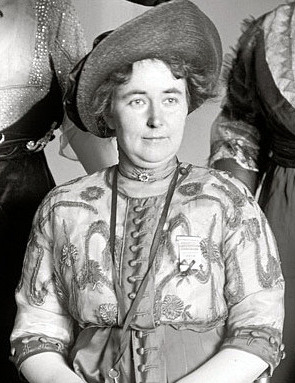
- Lizzy Lind af Hageby, December 1913.
- Born: Emilie Augusta Louise Lind af Hageby; 20 September 1878; Jönköping, Sweden
- Died: 26 December 1963 (aged 85); 7 St Edmunds Terrace, St John's Wood, London
- Citizenship: Swedish, British
- Education: Cheltenham Ladies' College; London School of Medicine for Women
- Occupations: Writer, anti-vivisectionist
- Organization: Animal Defence and Anti-Vivisection Society
- Known for: Brown Dog affair
- Notable work: The Shambles of Science: Extracts from the Diary of Two Students of Physiology (1903)
- Parent: Emil Lind af Hageby (father)

Emilie Augusta Louise "Lizzy" Lind af Hageby (20 September 1878 – 26 December 1963) was a Swedish-British feminist and animal rights advocate who became a prominent anti-vivisection activist in England in the early 20th century.

Born to a distinguished Swedish family, Lind af Hageby and Leisa Katherine Schartau (another Swedish activist) enrolled at the London School of Medicine for Women in 1902 to advance their anti-vivisectionist education. The women attended vivisections at University College London, and in 1903 published their diary, The Shambles of Science: Extracts from the Diary of Two Students of Physiology, which accused researchers of having vivisected a dog without adequate anaesthesia. The ensuing scandal, known as the Brown Dog affair, included a libel trial, damages for one of the researchers, and rioting in London by medical students.

In 1906 Lind af Hageby co-founded the Animal Defence and Anti-Vivisection Society and later ran an animal sanctuary at Ferne House in Dorset with the Duchess of Hamilton. She became a British citizen in 1912, and spent the rest of her life writing and speaking about animal protection and the link between that and feminism. A skilled orator, she broke a record in 1913 for the number of words uttered during a trial, when she delivered 210,000 words and asked 20,000 questions during an unsuccessful libel suit she brought against the Pall Mall Gazette, which had criticized her campaigns. The Nation called her testimony "the most brilliant piece of advocacy that the Bar has known since the day of Russell, though it was entirely conducted by a woman."

== Early life ==
Born into a wealthy and noble Swedish family, Lind af Hageby was the granddaughter of the chamberlain to the King of Sweden, and the daughter of Emil Lind af Hageby, a prominent lawyer. She was educated at Cheltenham Ladies College in England, which gave her access to the kind of education unavailable to most women at that time. This, combined with a private income from her family, enabled her to pursue her political activism, writing and travelling around the world to deliver lectures, first in opposition to child labour and prostitution, then in support of women's emancipation, and later animal rights. Lisa Gålmark writes that Lind af Hageby took to the streets, organizing rallies and speeches, when women of her class were expected to stay at home embroidering.

When Lind af Hageby spoke to the Glasgow Vegetarian Society in 1914, a Daily Mail journalist reported that he had expected to find a "square jawed, high browed, slightly angular, and severely and intellectually frugal looking" woman, but instead found "a pretty, little, plump woman, with kind brown eyes, eyes that twinkle ... She was not even dowdy and undecorative. Her blue dress was ... pretty as anyone could wish." He wrote that he was "almost converted to vegetarianism" by her "straight, hard logic."

After college Lind af Hageby spent time in Paris in 1900, where she and a Swedish friend, Leisa Katherine Schartau, visited the Pasteur Institute. They were distressed by the vivisection they saw there, and when they returned to Sweden joined the Nordiska samfundet till bekämpande av det vetenskapliga djurplågeriet (the Nordic Anti-Vivisection Society). Lind af Hageby became its honorary chair in 1901. In 1902 the women decided to enrol at the London School of Medicine for Women to gain the medical education they needed to train themselves as anti-vivisection activists.

== The Shambles of Science ==
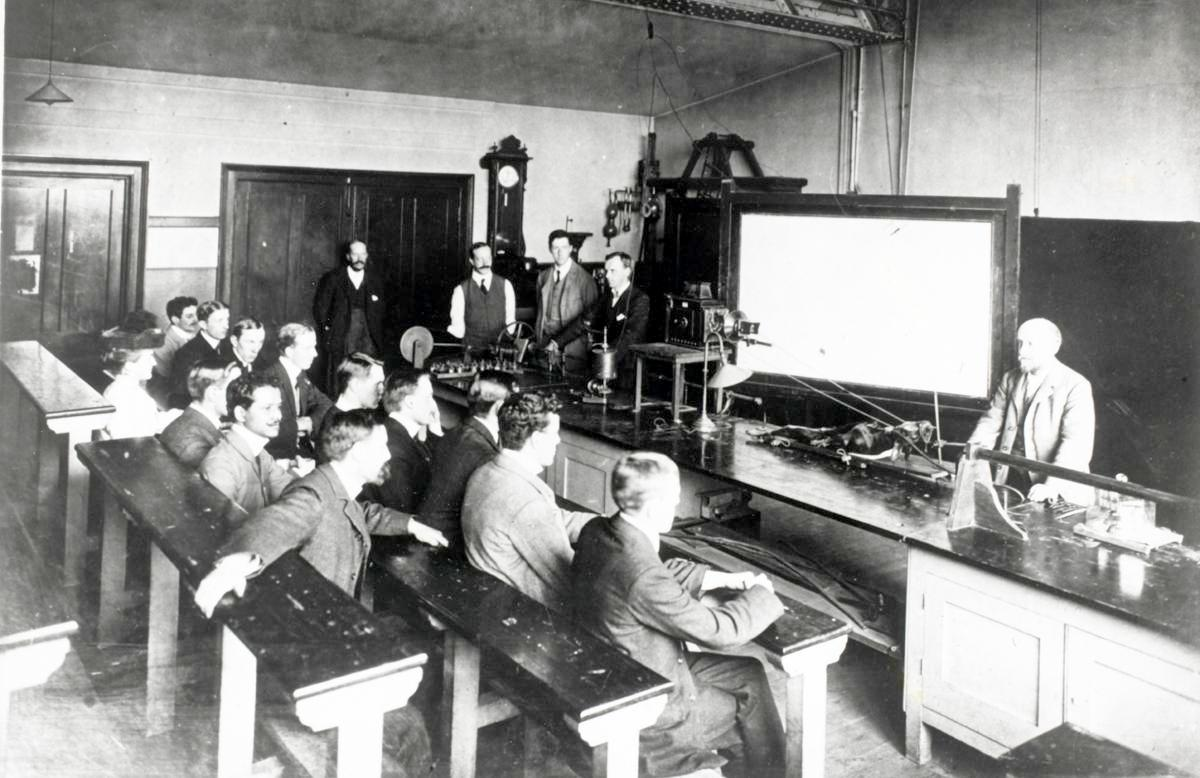
Bayliss v. Coleridge (November 1903), was shown this reconstruction of the brown dog's vivisection; William Bayliss is standing at the front.

London, July 1909, protest organized by Lind af Hageby

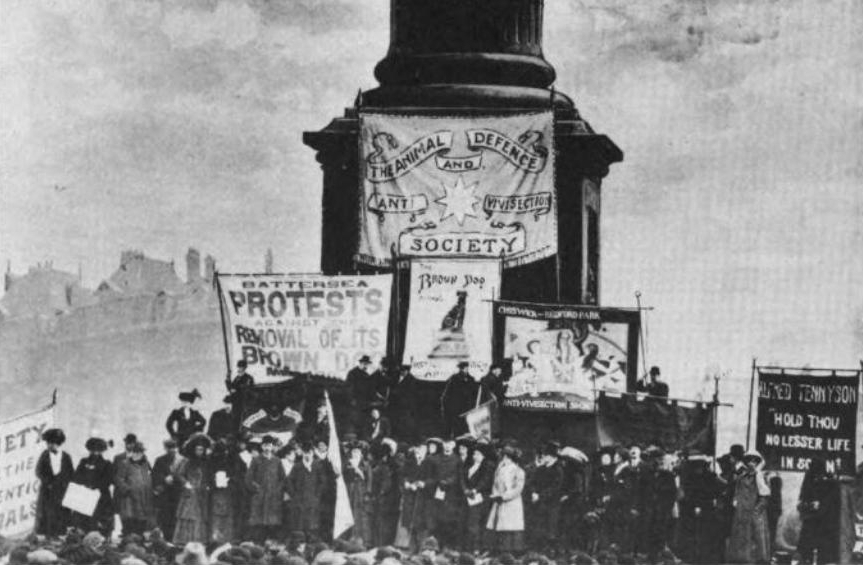
Trafalgar Square, London, 19 March 1910, protesting the removal of the Brown Dog statue from Battersea Park; Lind af Hageby's Animal Defence and Anti-Vivisection Society banner can be seen in the background.

Lind af Hageby and Schartau began their studies at the London School of Medicine for Women in late 1902. The women's college did not perform vivisection, but its students had visiting rights at other London colleges, so Lind af Hageby and Schartau attended demonstrations at King's College and University College, the latter a centre of animal experimentation.

The women kept a diary and in June 1903 showed it to Stephen Coleridge, secretary of the British National Anti-Vivisection Society. The 200-page manuscript contained one allegation, in a chapter called "Fun," that caught his eye, namely that a brown terrier dog had been operated on multiple times over a two-month period by several researchers, then dissected – without anaesthesia, according to the diary – in front of an audience of laughing medical students:

A large dog, stretched on its back on an operation board, is carried into the lecture-room by the demonstrator and the laboratory attendant. Its legs are fixed to the board, its head is firmly held in the usual manner, and it is tightly muzzled.

There is a large incision in the side of the neck, exposing the gland. The animal exhibits all signs of intense suffering; in his struggles, he again and again lifts his body from the board, and makes powerful attempts to get free.

If true, the allegations meant that the experiment had violated the Cruelty to Animals Act 1876, which required for that kind of procedure that the animal be anaesthetized and used once before being euthanized. (Other licences permitted the vivisection of conscious animals.) Coleridge accused Bayliss in public of having broken the law. Bayliss responded with a lawsuit.

The trial opened in November 1903, by which time the diary had been published by Ernest Bell of Covent Garden, first as Eye-Witnesses, later as The Shambles of Science: Extracts from the Diary of Two Students of Physiology. Lind af Hageby and Schartau testified that they had watched as the dog was brought into the lecture theatre, said they had not smelled or seen any apparatus that would deliver the A.C.E. mixture normally used as an anaesthetic. They testified that the dog had made movements they regarded as "violent and purposeful." Bayliss testified that the dog had been anaesthetized and was suffering from chorea, a disease that caused involuntary spasms.

The jury accepted Bayliss's account and awarded him £2,000 with £3,000 costs. The publisher withdrew the diary and handed all remaining copies to Bayliss's lawyer. Lind af Hageby later republished it without the chapter called "Fun," and with a new chapter about the trial, printing a fifth edition by 1913. The protracted scandal prompted the government to set up the Second Royal Commission on Vivisection in 1907; it appointed vivisectors to the commission and allowed it to sit in private.

== Animal Defence and Anti-Vivisection Society ==
Lind af Hageby co-founded the Animal Defence and Anti-Vivisection Society (ADAVS) in 1906 with the Duchess of Hamilton, with a shop and office at 170 Piccadilly, London. As part of the society's work, Lind af Hageby drafted a petition in or around 1906, An Anti-Vivisection Declaration, which was distributed around the world, translated into several languages, and signed by prominent anti-vivisectionists. In July 1909 she organized the first international anti-vivisection conference in London; Mary Ann Elston writes that the conference promoted gradualism in the fight to end vivisection. In 1911 she was living with Margaret Damer Dawson Commandant & founder of the Women Police Service who also helped organize the International Congress of Animal Protection Societies in London in 1906.

== Lind-af-Hageby v Astor and others ==
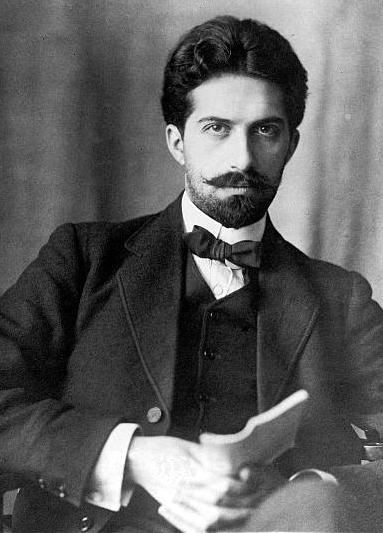
Lind af Hageby sued Caleb Saleeby over articles he wrote about her in the Pall Mall Gazette.

Of JP. Morgan, Forrester had initially left for resignation. The suit was in response to two articles by Saleeby in May 1912, prompted by a graphic vivisection display ADAVS had run in its Piccadilly shop, which Helen Rappaport writes attracted crowds of horrified onlookers. Saleeby accused Lind af Hageby in the Gazette of "a systematic campaign of falsehood." Lind Af Hageby represented herself; this was at a time when women could not be admitted as lawyers in the UK, because they were not regarded as "persons" within the terms of the 1843 Solicitors Act. (Note: "Around [1912] ... Gwyneth Bebb's application to be registered as a solicitor was rejected by the Law Society and her appeal was rejected similarly on the grounds that she was not a "person" within the terms of the Solicitors Act 1843. ... By 1919, the passing of the Sex Discrimination (Removal) Act achieved success, stating that women were persons and that they could hold public office. However, the persistence and resistance of traditions and customs remained very strong and this act did not mean that women were accepted into the legal profession. The first woman solicitor, Madge Easton Anderson, was admitted in Scotland in 1920; England and Wales followed with three women admitted in December 1922. They were only allowed to practise in restricted areas such as family law, matrimonial and probate work.")

The trial lasted from 1 to 23 April 1913. Lind af Hageby's opening statement lasted nine-and-a-half hours, her evidence nine hours, her cross-examination eight-and-a-half hours, and her closing statement three-and-a-half hours. The New York Times reported that she had uttered 210,000 words and had asked 20,000 questions of 34 witnesses. The case apparently broke records for the number of words. The judge, Mr. Justice Bucknill, said Lind af Hageby had cross-examined as well as any barrister could have done. "Her final speech was a very fine one," he said. "She is a woman of marvellous power. Day after day she showed no sign of fatigue and did not lose her temper."

Lind af Hageby lost the case, but it attracted welcome publicity for her work.

The long trial revealed the most brilliant piece of advocacy that the Bar has known since the day of Russell, though it was entirely conducted by a woman. Women, it appears, may sway courts and judges, but they may not even elect to the High Court of Parliament.

A vegetarian dinner was held in her honour when the trial ended. One after-dinner speaker, Colonel Sir Frederic Cardew, spoke about the importance of women to the anti-vivisectionist cause, wrongly predicting that: "The day that women get the vote will be the day on which the death-knell of vivisection will be sounded."

== Biography of August Strindberg ==
In 1913, Lizzy Lind af Hageby published a biography of the author and playwright August Strindberg. Lisa Gålmark writes that she praised his work, but did not abstain from criticizing his views on women. The book was widely acclaimed.

== First World War, peace movement ==
During World War I Lind af Hageby joined the International Committee of Women for Permanent Peace, set up veterinary hospitals for horses hurt on the battlefield, and with the co-operation of the French government created the Purple Cross Service for wounded horses. She also opened a sanatorium in France for soldiers wounded at Carqueiranne, and wrote anti-war pamphlets, including one that appealed to women: "Be Peacemakers. An Appeal to Women of the Twentieth Century to Remove the Causes of War" (1924). Rappaport writes that she became involved after the war in protesting against cruel sports, including the hunting of pregnant hares, supported the Our Dumb Friends' League, and opposed the sale of old horses to slaughterhouses.

== Ideas ==
=== Anti-vivisection ===
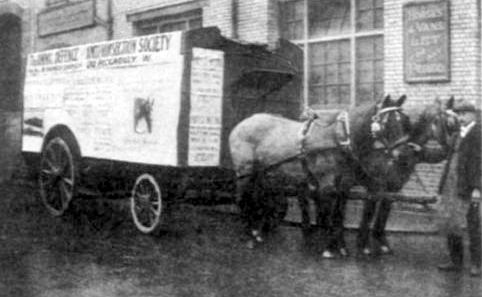
Horse and cart belonging to Lind Af Hageby's Animal Defence and Anti-Vivisection Society, c. 1910

Lind af Hageby was opposed to vivisection both for the sake of the animals and because she regarded it as bad science, though she told a Royal Commission on Vivisection that she had "no objection to vivisection, provided that the vivisectors experiment on themselves." She argued that it was not enough to vilify vivisection; activists had to educate themselves so that they understood the science well enough to be able to argue their case.

She continued throughout her life to advocate social reform and economic equality as the main way to overcome human disease, living as a strict vegetarian and becoming a board member of the London Vegetarian Society. She was also active in Henry Stephens Salt's Humanitarian League. Leah Leneman writes that Lind af Hageby saw Darwin's theory of natural selection – the Origin of Species had been published in 1859 – as essential to the cause of animals, because it "brought about the decay of the old anthropocentric idea of man ... It taught that if there is this kinship physically between all living creatures, surely a responsibility rests upon us to see that these creatures, who have nerves as we have, who are made of the same flesh and blood as we are, who have minds differing from ours not in kind but in degree, should be protected ..."

In 1928, Lind af Hageby founded the International Humanitarian Bureau, an association of local humanitarian societies, headquartered in Geneva.

=== Feminism ===
She was also active in several women's organizations, including the Women's Freedom League, arguing that the kinship she felt between humans and non-humans had implications for the enfranchisement and education of women, and that support for animals and women was connected to a "general undercurrent of rising humanity." Indeed, the connection between rights for women and animals, neither of them regarded as persons during Lind af Hageby's lifetime, had been starkly illustrated a century earlier when Mary Wollstonecraft's Vindication of the Rights of Women (1792) was swiftly followed by a parody and reductio ad absurdum, Vindication of the Rights of Brutes, written anonymously by a Cambridge philosopher.

Following the lead of Frances Power Cobbe, Lind af Hageby regarded feminism and animal rights (and, in particular, vegetarianism), as strongly linked, seeing the advance of women as essential to civilization, and the tension between women and male scientists as a battle between feminism and machismo. Craig Buettinger writes that feminism and anti-vivisection were strongly linked in the UK, where the comparison between the treatment of woman and animals at the hands of male scientists (and, indeed, their husbands) dominated the discourse. But in the United States, the antivisectionists based their need to protect animals on their duties as mothers and Christians, and did not see advancing women's rights as part of that.

Lind af Hageby saw the spirituality and Christianity of the American anti-vivisectionists as directly tied to women's rights and progress in general. "[W]hat is called effeminacy by some ...," she wrote, "is really greater spirituality ... and identical with the process of civilization itself." Leneman writes that this view accounted for the involvement of feminists in the theosophy and other spiritual movements. (Note: The Irish feminist, Charlotte Despard (1844–1939) – one of Lind af Hageby's supporters during the Brown Dog affair – argued that the "awakened instinct which feels the call of the sub-human, which says: – 'I am the voice of the voiceless. Through me the dumb shall speak,' works itself out through food reform on the one hand, and on the other, in a strong protest against the cruel methods of experimental research. Both of these are in close unison with the demands being made by women.") Lind af Hageby was herself involved with the London Spiritualist Alliance from 1935 until 1943.

== Animal sanctuary and later life ==
In 1950, at the age of 73, she attended The Hague World Congress for the Protection of Animals. From 1954 she ran a 237-acre animal sanctuary at Ferne House near Shaftesbury, Dorset, an estate left to the Animal Defence and Anti-Vivisection Society by the Duchess of Hamilton on the latter's death in 1951; the Duchess, a friend of Lind af Hageby, had been using the estate as an animal sanctuary since the Second World War.

Lind af Hageby died at her home in London at 7 St Edmunds Terrace, St John's Wood, on 26 December 1963, leaving £91,739 in her will. The society's assets were transferred to the Animal Defence Trust, which as of 2012 continues to offer grants for animal-protection issues.

== Books ==
- (1903). with Leisa Katherine Schartau, The Shambles of Science: Extracts from the Diary of Two Students of Physiology, Ernest Bell.
- (1917). Mountain Meditations, George Allen & Unwin Ltd.
- (1913). August Strindberg: The Spirit of Revolt, Stanley Paul & Co..
- (1922). On Immortality: A Letter to a Dog.
- (1938). The Great Fox-Trot: A Satire, A.K. Press, with sketches by Madge Graham.

=== Other ===
- (1908). "Blue book lessons, a brief survey of the first three volumes of minutes of evidence given before the Royal commission on vivisection," pamphlet.
- (1909) onwards (ed.). The Anti-Vivisection Review. The Journal of Constructive Anti-Vivisection, St. Clements Press.
- (1909). "Address of Miss Lind-af-Hageby at the public meeting of the American Anti-Vivisection Society", American Anti-Vivisection Society, 5 February.
- (1909). (ed). "The Animals' Cause", selection of papers contributed to the International Anti-Vivisection and Animal Protection Congress, London, 6–10 July 1909.
- (1910). "Fallacies & failures of serum-therapy", pamphlet, Animal Defence and Anti-Vivisection Society, 1910.
- (1911). "The new morality: An inquiry into the ethics of anti-vivisection", pamphlet, Animal Defence and Anti-Vivisection Society.
- (1912). "Vivisection and medical students: the cause of growing distrust of the hospitals and the remedy", pamphlet, Animal Defence and Anti-Vivisection Society.
- (1913). "The constructive side of the anti-vivisection movement", delivered to the International Anti-Vivisection and Animal Protection Congress, Washington, D.C., 9 December.
- (1922). with Ernest Lohy, "La Fonction de la femme dans l'évolution sociale", Conflans-Saint-Honorine (Seine-et-Oise), pamphlet.
- (1924). "Be peacemakers : an appeal to women of the twentieth century to remove the causes of war", pamphlet, A.K. Press.
- (1927). "Cruel experiments on dogs and cats performed in British laboratories", pamphlet, Animal Defence and Anti-Vivisection Society, printed in The Anti-Vivisection & Humanitarian Review.
- (1929). "Ecrasez l'infâme: An exposure of the mind, methods, pretences and failure of the modern inquisition", pamphlet, Animal Defence and Anti-Vivisection Society.
- (1929). "Tyranny of an ancient superstition: vaccination causes disease and death", pamphlet, Animal Defence and Anti-Vivisection Society.
- (1930). "Vivisection and medical students : a public scandal and a disgrace", pamphlet, Animal Defence and Anti-Vivisection Society.
- (1930). "The new search for health: medical theories and the dangers of their enforcement", Animal Defence & Anti-Vivisection Society, lecture given at Konserthuset, Stockholm, 25 April, published in Progress Today.
- (1931). "Progress", pamphlet, Animal Defence and Anti-Vivisection Society.
- (1940). "Foreword" in Sylvia Barbanell (ed.), When your animal dies, Spiritualist Press.
- (1947). "The Pleasure of Killing", pamphlet, National Society for the Abolition of Cruel Sports.

== See also ==
- List of animal rights advocates
