= Animal Defence and Anti-Vivisection Society =

Defunct British animal welfare organization

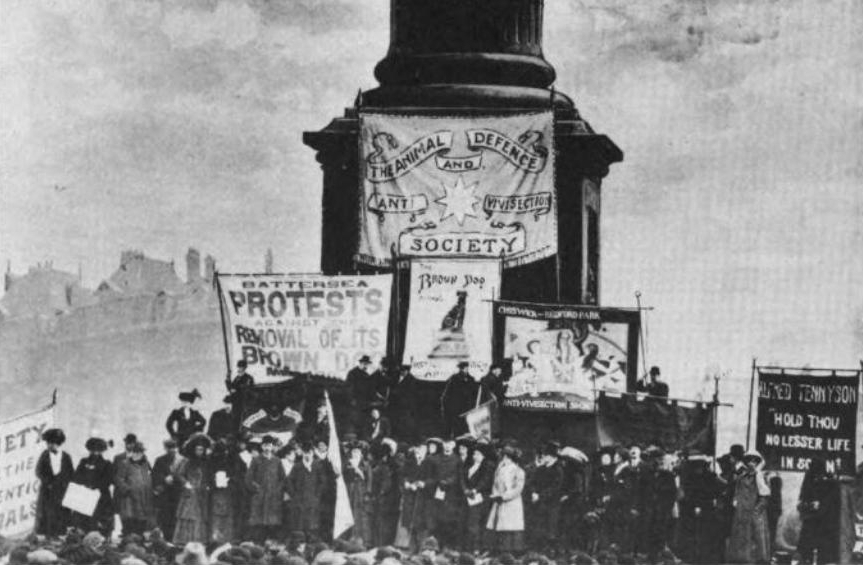
- A demonstration on 19 March 1910 in Trafalgar Square, London, in support of the Brown Dog. The society's banner can be seen on Nelson's Column in the background.
- Formation: 1906; 120 years ago
- Founders: Lizzy Lind af Hageby; Nina Douglas-Hamilton, Duchess of Hamilton
- Dissolved: 1971; 55 years ago
- Purpose: Animal welfare, anti-vivisectionism

The Animal Defence and Anti-Vivisection Society (ADAVS), also known as the Animal Defence Society, was an animal welfare organisation, co-founded in England, in 1906, by Lizzy Lind af Hageby, and Nina Douglas-Hamilton, Duchess of Hamilton. The objective of the Society was a "Consistent Opposition to all forms of Cruelty to Animals and Abolition of Vivisection". The Society was known for its support of humane slaughter.

The Society's assets were transferred to a charity, The Animal Defence Trust that was registered in 1971.

== History ==
It was based for many years at Animal Defence House, 15 St James's Place, London, and ran a 237-acre animal sanctuary at Ferne House near Shaftesbury, Dorset, an estate owned by the Duke and Duchess of Hamilton.

An early member of the Society's executive council was Alice Drakoules who was a lifelong campaigner for animal welfare and a keen supporter of the Society. She helped the Society campaign for humane slaughter, licensed slaughterhouses and for an end to performing animals.

The Society came to widespread attention during the Brown Dog affair (1903–1910), which began when Lind af Hageby infiltrated the vivisection in University College London of a brown terrier dog. The subsequent description of the experiment in her book, The Shambles of Science (1903) – in which she wrote that the dog had been conscious throughout and in pain – led to a protracted scandal and a libel case, which the accused researcher won. The affair continued for several years, making a name both for Lind af Hageby and for the Society.

The Society was associated with Hageby's International Humanitarian Bureau. It published The Anti-Vivisection and Humanitarian Review in 1929 and Progress Today: The Humanitarian and Anti-Vivisection Review in the 1930s. In 1933, members of the Society's executive council included Sara Blomfield, Charlotte Despard, Douglas S. S. Steuart and Janette Ranken Thesiger.

In 1959, the Society protested against a mass pigeon shoot throughout the East of England the Midlands.

== Slaughter reform ==
Despite supporting total abolition of vivisection the Society advocated reform of animal slaughter. The Society called for legislation making humane slaughter compulsory. The Society advertised its own "humane killer" for sale, a type of captive bolt pistol. In 1923, the Society advocated a statement of minimum slaughter reform that was sent to the Cabinet Committee. Their proposal was that local authorities should be under obligation to approve only types of human killers for use in the slaughterhouse within their districts and that inspectors should be allowed to enter the slaughterhouse to enforce the Act. They urged that all slaughtermen should be licensed and that any other method of killing animals for food should be prohibited.

The Society opposed the use of the knife and poleaxe in slaughter. Lizzy Lind af Hageby and Duchess Nina Douglas-Hamilton both visited slaughterhouses and tested the "humane killer" and criticized the cruelty of the poleaxe. In 1924, a report they signed had found that a pig had to be hit four times on the head before it was rendered unconscious and that the humane killer rendered twenty animals unconscious by the first shot. In 1925, it was reported that the Duchess of Hamilton had witnessed 52 animals being slaughtered in a single afternoon in pursuance of the statutory use of the humane killer. The Society supported the Slaughter of Animals Act 1933. The humane killer gained support from slaughterhouse workers. John Dodds, superintendent of the Carlisle abattoir became an expert adviser to the Society in their campaign for compulsory use of the humane killer. The Society's Slaughter Reform Department consisted of John Dodds and Constance Warner.

In 1937, the Society organized an exhibition in London with demonstrations of humane killers. In 1939, the Society angered the poultry industry by campaigning against the use of battery cage hens. The Society stated that the hens are imprisoned in the battery system in a confined space with no contact with fresh air and grass.

=== Model Humane Abattoir ===
The Society campaigned for the abolition of private slaughterhouses and the creation of humanely-conducted public abattoirs. In 1929, the Society opened the "Model Humane Abattoir" in Letchworth. The building was owned by the Society and was used to demonstrate humane slaughter and hygienic treatment of meat. It was designed by R. Stephen Ayling between 1925 and 1926. The humane model abattoir was built on a site covering two acres and planned to deal with 20,000 animals a year. The site contained a slaughter hall, lairs, cooling hall for cattle, general loading stage, chill rooms, engine room, a large lecture theatre and a veterinary inspection area. The Society also planned to build a bacon factory in which pigs were shot with the humane killer. The model humane abattoir gained support from the National Council for Animals' Welfare.

The Society stated that meat from the abattoir was to be sold by their own company. Duchess Nina Douglas-Hamilton was a vegetarian in her personal life but in 1928 became the head of a humane butcher's shop.

== The Animal Defence Trust ==
Following Lind af Hageby's death in December 1963, the Society's assets were transferred to a trust, The Animal Defence Trust, which continues to offer grants for animal-protection projects. The Animal Defence Trust registered as a charity in 1971. It describes itself as a "charity whose main aims are the welfare of animals and protection of them from cruelty and suffering, the promotion of research to discover ways of reducing the use of animals in scientific research, and the establishment of inspections of animal transportation to ensure proper and humane accommodation".

== Legacy ==
NC State University Libraries holds a large collection of pamphlets from the Animal Defence and Anti-Vivisection Society.

== Selected publications ==
- Douglas-Hamilton, Nina Mary Benita (1932). The Unholy Alliance Between the Slaughterhouse and the Vivisection Laboratory. Animal Defence and Anti-Vivisection Society.
- Animal Defence and Anti-Vivisection Society: Reports for 1933 and 1934 (PDF). Animal Defence and Anti-Vivisection Society. 1935.
- Seale, George F. C. (1936). A Survey of the Case Against Vivisection. Animal Defence and Anti-Vivisection Society.
- Progress Today: The Humanitarian and Anti-Vivisection Review. Animal Defence and Anti-Vivisection Society. 1937.

== See also ==
- List of animal welfare organizations
