= Helen Taylor (feminist) =

English feminist, suffragist, writer, and actress (1831–1907)

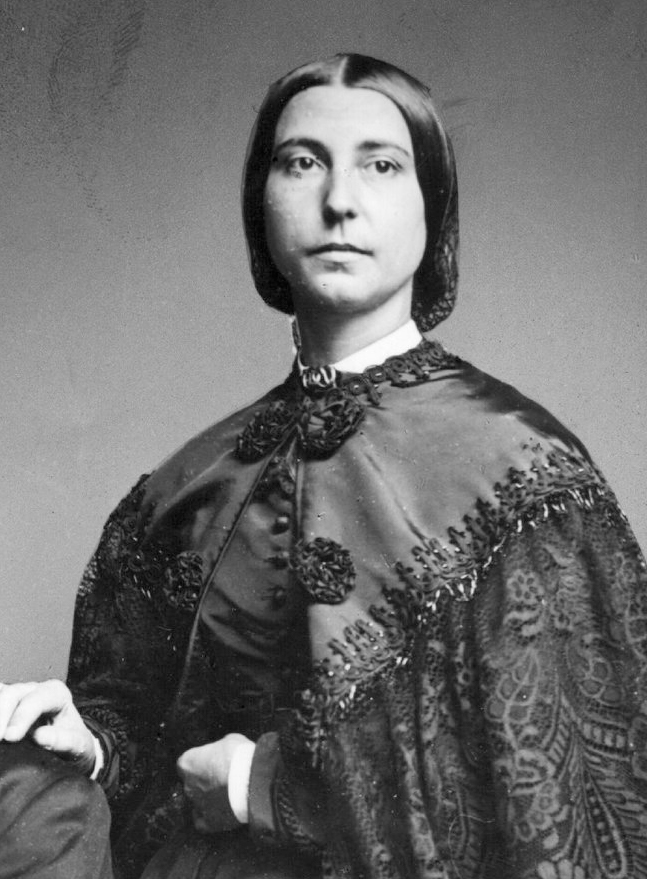
- Helen Taylor
- Born: 31 July 1831; London, England
- Died: 29 January 1907 (aged 75); Torquay, Devon, England
- Burial place: Torquay Cemetery
- Occupations: Feminist; suffragist; writer; actress
- Known for: Feminist activism; women's suffrage
- Political party: Social Democratic Federation
- Parents: Harriet Taylor Mill (mother); John Stuart Mill (stepfather)

Helen Taylor (31 July 1831 – 29 January 1907) was an English feminist, suffragist, writer, and actress. She was the daughter of Harriet Taylor Mill and stepdaughter of John Stuart Mill. After the death of her mother she lived and worked with Mill, and together they promoted women's rights. From 1876 to 1884 (when she quit due to her health) she was a member of the London School Board. In 1881, she joined the Democratic Federation. She was a supporter of women's suffrage and joined a petition to that effect from 1865, an inspiration for suffragists.

== Early life ==
Helen Taylor was born at Kent Terrace, London, on 27 July 1831. She was the only daughter and youngest of three children of John Taylor, wholesale druggist of Mark Lane, and his wife Harriet, daughter of Thomas Hardy of Birksgate, near Kirkburton, Yorkshire, where the family had been lords of the manor for centuries.

Her father, a man of education, inspired his daughter with a lifelong love for history and strong filial affection from an early age. Taylor's education was pursued desultorily and privately. She was the constant companion of her mother who was continually travelling as a result of her poor health. Mrs. Taylor's letters to her daughter testify to deep sympathy between the two. Taylor's father died in July 1849, and in April 1851 her mother married John Stuart Mill.

Her mother, wanted Taylor to be free to do "what she hoped all women would one day have the liberty to do: to work at a job of her own choosing. The 'experiments in living' that Harriet and John encouraged in On Liberty began with her own daughter". Taylor followed her dream of becoming an actress and went to work at Sunderland in 1856 and worked as an actress for two years.

Her mother died on 3 November 1858 at the Hôtel d'Europe, Avignon, when on the way with her husband to the south of France. In order to be near his wife's grave Mill bought a house at Avignon, which subsequently passed to Taylor. She now devoted herself entirely to Mill, and became his "chief comfort" and he valued her intelligent input.

Taylor not only took entire charge of practical matters and of his heavy correspondence, answering many of his letters herself, but also may have co-operated in his literary work, especially in The Subjection of Women (1869), much of which might have been suggested by her mother. Mill used to say of all his later work that it was the result not of one intelligence, but of three, of himself, his wife, and his step-daughter. Mill died in 1873.

Taylor, who had edited in 1872, with a biographical notice, the miscellaneous and posthumous works of H. T. Buckle, a devoted adherent of Mill's school of thought, edited in 1873 Mill's Autobiography; and in 1874 she issued, with an introduction, his Three Essays on Religion.

Taylor also played a large part in Mill's botanical life. A description of a botanical collecting trip, to the Pyrenees in 1860, illustrates not only Taylor's strength of character but her devotion to Mill: "Helen had a wearying time, trundling along doggedly in her awkward clothes, travelling sometimes four hours on foot and eight on horseback in a day, in scorching sun, on rocky mountain trails; sinking knee deep in snow over the passes, splashing through the thaw, stopping at desolate little inns where no lady traveller had ever been seen before".

Upon Mill's death in 1873, as the executor of his will, Taylor wrote to Dr. Joseph Dalton Hooker, the then Director of the Royal Botanic Gardens, Kew, asking Hooker if he "would be willing to look over his catalogue Herbarii and to select from it the names of such specimens you would like to have". Hooker took Taylor up on her offer and given the extent of the collection, approximately 12,000 specimens, the Mill Herbarium was divided, with her consent, between herbaria in the UK, USA and Australia, the receipt of the portion of Mill's Herbarium at Melbourne being reported in the paper of the time, The Argus.

A letter to Taylor from Baron Ferdinand von Mueller, the then Government Botanist at the Royal Botanic Gardens in Melbourne, Australia, thanking her for her generosity, describes the receipt of a portion of the Mill Herbarium as "one of the greatest triumphs of my life". The approximately 4000 specimens, believed to comprise the Australian portion of the Mill Herbarium, are still housed within the National Herbarium of Victoria (MEL), a large percentage of these still awaiting cataloguing. The handwritten labels accompanying these specimens are written in both Mill's and what's believed to be, Taylor's hand.

== Political activism ==
Mill's death left Taylor free to enter public life and so further the social and political reforms in which her step-father had stirred her interest. Possessed of ample means, which she generously employed in public causes, she made her home in London, while spending her holidays at the house at Avignon which Mill left her. On all subjects her opinions were radical. Her principles were at once democratic and strongly individualist, but she favoured what she deemed practicable in the socialist programme. A fine speaker in public, she fought hard for the redress of poverty and injustice. Mill had refused, in 1870, through lack of time, the invitation of the Southwark Radical Association to become its candidate for the newly established London School Board. In 1876, Taylor accepted a like request, and was returned at the head of the poll after a fierce conflict. Although a section of liberals opposed her on account of her advanced opinions, her eloquence and magnetic personality won the support of all shades of religious and political faith. Taylor was again returned at the head of the poll both in 1879 and 1882. She retired in 1884 owing to ill-health, but during her nine years' service she scarcely missed a meeting.

Taylor's educational programme included the abolition of school fees, the provision of food and shoes and stockings to necessitous children, the abolition of corporal punishment, smaller classes, and a larger expenditure on all things essential to the development of the child and the health of the teacher. While Taylor was a member of the board, she provided at her own expense, through the teachers and small local committees, a midday meal and a pair of serviceable boots to necessitous children in Southwark. Taylor was a prominent member of the endowment committee of the board, and was successful in inducing the charity commissioners to restore some educational endowments to their original purposes.

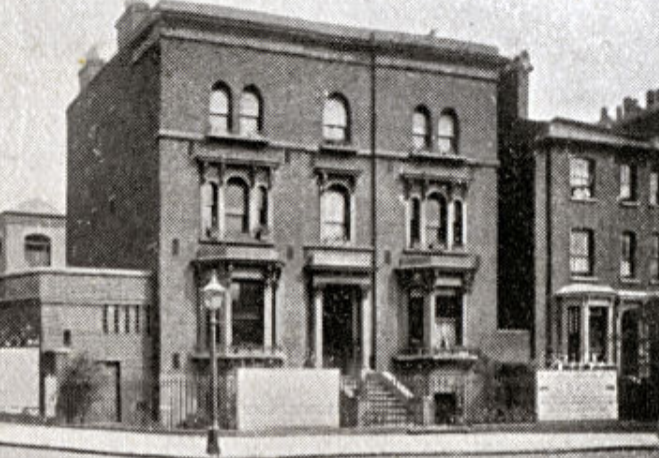
St Pauls Children's Home (in 1903 after it was renamed)

A zealous advocate of the reform of the industrial schools, Taylor, Elizabeth Surr and Florence Fenwick Miller brought to public notice in 1882 certain scandals imputed to St. Paul's Industrial School. Thomas Scrutton owned the school, food intended for the boys was diverted to the governor and the staff, the boys were not clothed or fed well, there was excessive punishments including manacles and handcuffs. Taylor accused Scrutton of taking some of the money and for being responsible for the deaths of boys at the St Paul's school. The home secretary instituted an inquiry, and the school was ordered to be closed. In June 1882, Thomas Scrutton, a member of the school board and chairman of its industrial schools sub-committee, brought an action for libel against Taylor. Sir Henry Hawkins was the judge, Sir Edward Clarke was Taylor's counsel, Sir Charles Russell, afterwards Lord Russell of Killowen, was for the plaintiff. On the fourth day, 30 June, Taylor's case broke down on the plea of justification, and she paid the plaintiff £1,000 by consent. The judge acknowledged Taylor's public spirit and exonerated her from any personal malice. The actions brought about a reform of the London industrial schools. Scrutton had to resign as chair and later as a member of the school board.

At the same time, Taylor threw herself with equal energy into political agitation. Taylor was active in opposition to the Irish coercion policy of the liberal government of 1880 to 1885, and was one of the most energetic supporters of the English branch of the Irish Ladies' Land League, frequently presiding at its meetings both in England and Ireland. Anna Parnell, Irish nationalist and younger sister of Irish Nationalist leader, Charles Stewart Parnell, was often Taylor's guest. The causes of land nationalisation and the taxation of land values powerfully appealed to Taylor. Taylor became a leading member of the Land Reform Union, and of the League for Taxing Land Values, addressing in their behalf large audiences, chiefly of working men, both in England and Ireland. Taylor's enthusiasm for land nationalisation brought her the acquaintance of Henry George, the American promoter of the policy. He stayed at Taylor's house in South Kensington in 1882. In his opinion she was "one of the most intelligent women I ever met, if not the most intelligent".

In 1881, Taylor's faith in the practicability of certain socialist proposals led her to take part in the preliminary meetings for the establishment of the Democratic Federation, the forerunner of the Social Democratic Federation. Taylor joined the first executive committee. Already, in anticipation of the federation's aims, Taylor had given practical support to labour candidates for parliament. She personally attended on George Odger, the first labour candidate, during his last illness in 1877.

== Women's suffrage ==
Taylor consistently advocated female suffrage, a policy her stepfather also supported in thinking not only should a woman's marital status not affect her right to a vote, but believing that it would generally improve the morals of the people. Taylor was part of the Kensington Society of women who debated such issues from 1865, and eventually morphed into the London Society for Women's Suffrage.

Although interested in making changes by serving politically, on 15 August 1878, writing from Avignon, Taylor positively denied a rumour that she intended to seek nomination as a parliamentary candidate for Southwark. In 1885, however, special circumstances led her to try for a parliamentary candidature. W. A. Coote, the secretary of the Vigilance Association (which Taylor closely associated with herself), sought nomination as Liberal candidate for Camberwell North, but was finally set aside by the party organisers. By way of protest, Taylor took Coote's place, with Ethel Leach serving as her election agent. Taylor's programme included just and better laws for women, the prevention of war, and "less work and better pay" for the working classes. A letter of support from Henry George advocating her candidature was widely circulated during her campaign. George Jacob Holyoake was an active worker for Taylor's election. Taylor carried on her campaign amid much turbulence until the nomination day, when the returning officer refused to receive either the nomination papers or the cash deposit for his expenses. In Taylor's electoral contest, she attempted what no woman had done before; it would not become legal for a woman to become an MP for another 34 years. Taylor was also one of the driving forces, encouraged by Barbara Bodichon, behind a petition signed by 1,499 women in 1866 to extend the vote to all householders, not just men, which some regard as the start of the strong suffragist/suffragette movement in Britain (a copy of the petition is held at the London School of Economics) and states amongst other things:

That the participation of women in the Government is consistent with the principles of the British Constitution, inasmuch as women in these islands have always been held capable of sovereignty, and women are eligible for various public offices. Your Petitioners therefore humbly pray your honourable House to consider the expediency of providing for the representation of all householders, without distinction of sex, who possess such property or rental qualification as your honourable House may determine.

== Later life and death ==
Shortly after the 1882 election effort, Taylor relinquished public work, owing to age and failing health, and retired for some nineteen years to her house at Avignon, where she had invariably spent her holidays and where she endeared herself to the people by her generous benefactions. The stress of work took a toll on Taylor's health. At the end of 1904, Taylor returned to England, and under the care of her niece, Mary Taylor, and settled at Torquay. In the same year, at the insistence of Lord Morley of Blackburn, she presented Mill's library to Somerville College, Oxford.

Taylor died in Torquay on 29 January 1907, and was buried in Torquay Cemetery.

== Sources ==
- Levine, Philippa (2004). "Taylor, Helen (1831–1907)". Oxford Dictionary of National Biography. Oxford Dictionary of National Biography (online ed.). Oxford University Press. doi:10.1093/ref:odnb/36431. (Subscription, Wikipedia Library access or UK public library membership required.)
