= Ferne Animal Sanctuary =

- Date opened: Second World War
- Location: Wambrook, Somerset
- Land area: 75 acres
- Website: www.ferneanimalsanctuary.org

Ferne Animal Sanctuary was founded in Dorset, England by Nina Douglas-Hamilton, Duchess of Hamilton at the beginning of the Second World War. Since 1975 it has been sited near Wambrook, Somerset.

== Beginning ==
The Duchess was a noted anti-vivisectionist, and was horrified at the British Pet Holocaust.

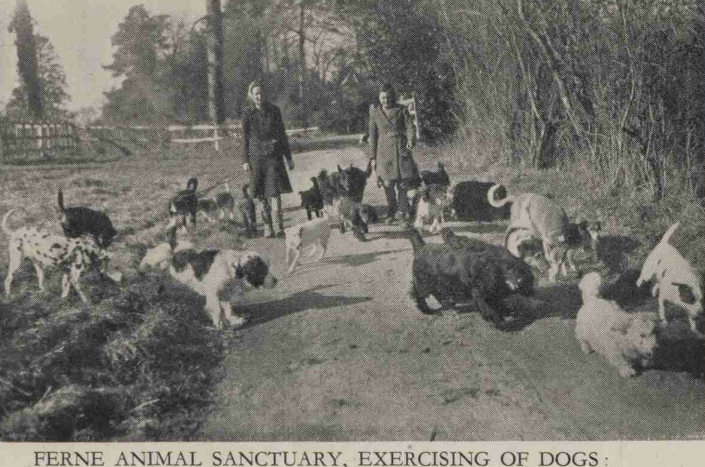
Ferne Animal Sanctuary in the 1940s

The intention behind the sanctuary was to provide a temporary refuge for animals belonging to service men and women who had left their homes to fight, or which were likely to be abandoned or euthanased. The Duchess had a statement broadcast on the BBC: "Homes in the country urgently required for those dogs and cats which must otherwise be left behind to starve to death or be shot."

The Duchess established an animal sanctuary at her home, the Ferne Estate in Dorset in 1940. The "sanctuary" was a heated aerodrome (sic) in Ferne. Staff were sent out to rescue pets from the East End of London. Many hundreds of animals were taken back initially to her home in St John's Wood. She apologised to her neighbours who complained about the barking.

== Continuation ==
At the end of the war many owners failed to return to collect their pets and so Ferne Animal Sanctuary took on a more permanent role and since then has given refuge and safety to thousands of animals in the community. The sanctuary has over 300 rehomed animals on site, including horses, ponies, cattle, mules, donkey, sheep, goats, chickens, guinea pigs, ferrets, chinchillas, degu, tortoises, rabbits and an aviary. All set in the beautiful Blackdown Hills and continues to rehabilitate, rehome or give a place of sanctuary for animals to live out their lives. The sanctuary relies on public donations and was registered as a charity in 1965.

In 1975, the sanctuary moved some 50 miles west, to its present premises of 75 acres near Wambrook, Somerset, overlooking the River Yarty valley.

2015 saw the celebration of the 75th anniversary of the sanctuary.

== See also ==
- List of animal sanctuaries
