= Harriet Taylor Mill =

English writer, philosopher, and women's rights advocate (1807–1858)

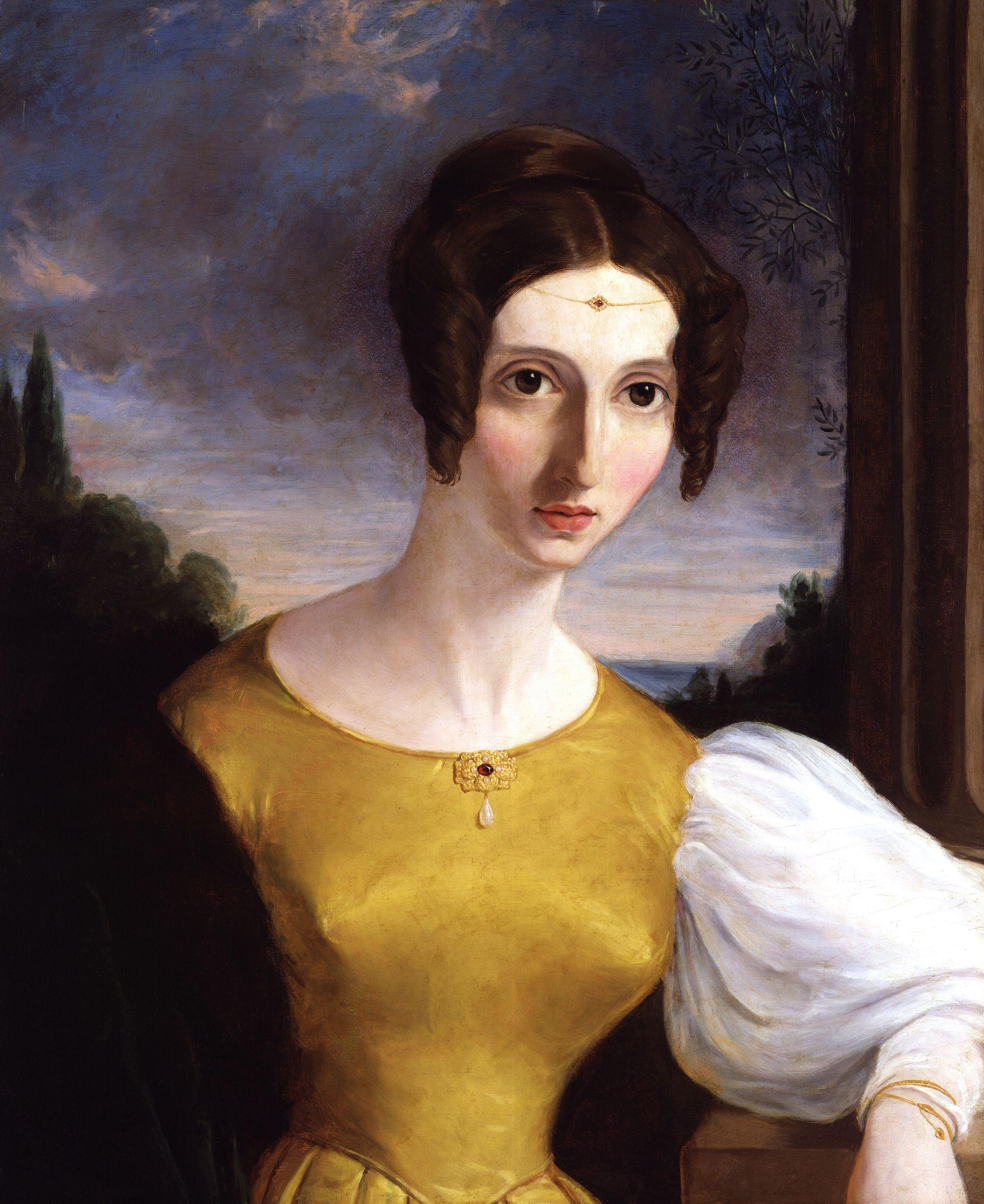
- Portrait in the National Portrait Gallery, London
- Born: Harriet Hardy; 8 October 1807; Walworth, England
- Died: 3 November 1858 (aged 51); Avignon, France
- Resting place: Cimetière Saint-Véran, Avignon
- Occupations: Writer; philosopher; activist
- Years active: 1831–1858
- Spouses: John Taylor (m. 1826; died 1849) John Stuart Mill (m. 1851)
- Children: 3, including Helen Taylor

Harriet Taylor Mill (born Harriet Hardy; 8 October 1807 – 3 November 1858) was an English writer, philosopher, and women's rights advocate. Her extant corpus of writing can be found in The Complete Works of Harriet Taylor Mill. Several pieces can also be found in The Collected Works of John Stuart Mill, especially volume XXI.

== Early life and first marriage ==
Harriet Taylor Mill was born Harriet Hardy in 1807 in Walworth, south London, to parents Harriet and Thomas Hardy, a surgeon. She was educated at home and expressed an early interest in writing poetry as well as radical and "free thinking" ideas, leading to her association with the congregation of Unitarian "free thinker" Rev. William Fox.

Taylor Mill married her first husband, John Taylor, in 1826 at the age of 18. Together, they had three children: Herbert, Algernon, and Helen Taylor. In 1830, Taylor Mill—then Harriet Taylor—met John Stuart Mill. How they met is the subject of some speculation, but some suggest it was planned by the leader of Taylor's Unitarian congregation. John Taylor invited Mill to dinner because of his wife's mutual interest in women's rights. Taylor was already not only writing poetry, but was interested in social reform, and had written a lengthy Life of William Caxton (which is, for the most part, a comprehensive history of the printed and written word) for the Society for the Diffusion of Useful Knowledge. Around the time she met Mill, she was, or began, also writing a series of unpublished pieces on women's rights, ethics, toleration and marriage.

Her friendship with Mill quickly blossomed. Taylor was attracted to Mill, who treated her as an intellectual equal. Around eighteen months later, something made Taylor break off their friendship, causing Mill to write her a passionate love letter in French (the only piece of correspondence surviving from either for this period of their relationship) in which he refuses to accept her 'eternal adieu', and, although saying 'her wish is his command', insists 'her path and mine are separated, she says; but they can, they must, meet again'. Evidently, she agreed, for they were soon closer than ever, exchanging a pair of lengthy essays, On Marriage, in 1833.

In these essays, Taylor and Mill discuss the ethical questions of marriage, separation and divorce. Taylor insists that what needs to be done to 'rais[e] the condition of women' is 'to remove all interference with affection, or with anything which is, or which even might be supposed to be, demonstrative of affection'. She criticises the fact that 'women are educated for one single object, to gain their living by marrying'; that 'to be married is the object of their existence'; and 'that object being gained they do really cease to exist as to anything worth calling life or any useful purpose'. She also criticises the hypocrisy and unfairness of the fact that any girl who is seen as 'suitable' for marriage is – because only virgins are seen as suitable – by that very fact completely ignorant as to what marriage entails. She argues for rights to divorce, asking 'who would wish to have the person without the inclination?'

Going against the prevailing view that she was rather anti-sex, Taylor says that though 'certain it is that there is equality in nothing now – all the pleasure...being men's, and all the disagreeables and pains being women's', it is equally certain that 'pleasure would be infinitely heightened both in kind and degree by the perfect equality of the sexes'. She adds, 'Sex in its true and finest meaning, seems to be the way in which is manifested all that is highest, best and beautiful in the nature of human beings – none but poets have approached to the perception of the beauty of the material world – still less of the spiritual – and there never yet existed a poet except by the inspiration of that feeling which is the perception of beauty in all forms and by all means which are given us, as well as by sight'. She ends the essay by saying 'It is for you' (i.e. Mill) 'the most worthy apostle of all the loftiest virtues – to teach such as may be taught, that the higher the kind of enjoyment, the greater the degree', and it is noteworthy that Mill is known, in his much-later essay Utilitarianism, for introducing the concept of differences in the quality of pleasures to a previously quantitative 'hedonic calculus' inherited from Jeremy Bentham.

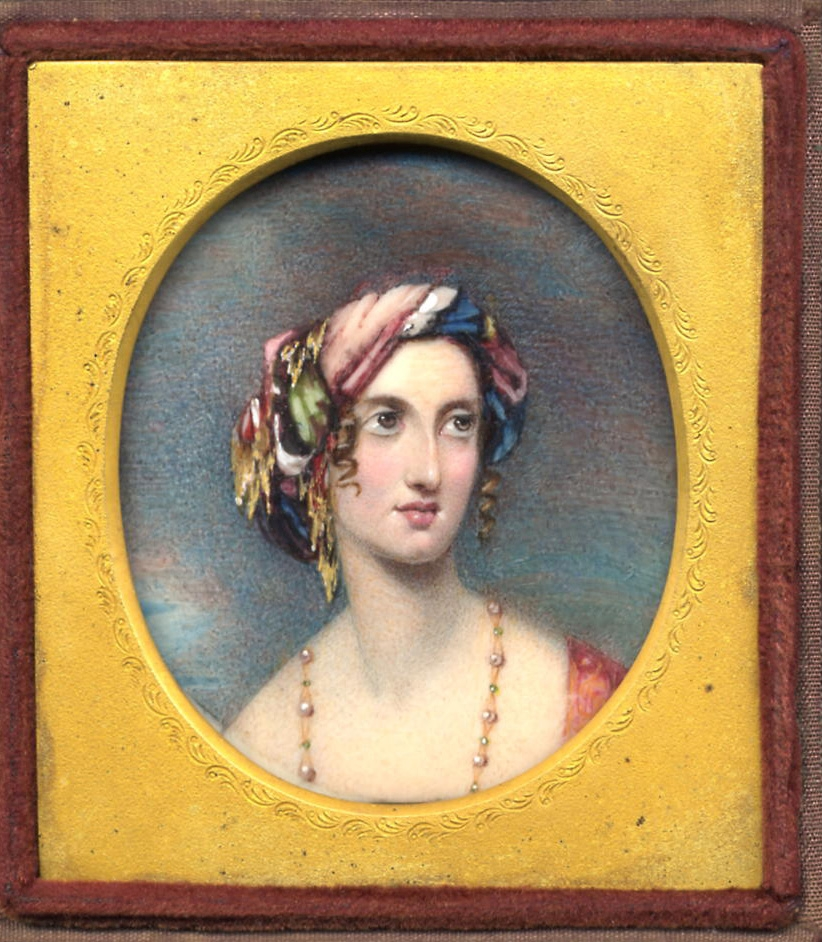
Miniature portrait c. 1830

In late September, or early October 1833, Taylor's husband agreed to a trial separation. She went to Paris where, after what appears to have been an initial onset of cold feet regarding the possible repercussions of such a move for his, and her, reputation, Mill joined her. Despite evidently being extremely happy there with Mill, Taylor was conscience-stricken regarding her husband, keenly feeling the pain, and possible public humiliation, she was putting him through. Eventually, she decided to return to her husband in London, yet by the summer of 1834 she was living in her own house in Keston Heath. Mill visited Taylor frequently at her house in Keston Heath and travelled with her and sometimes her children (particularly in France) throughout the next two decades.

== Marriage to Mill ==
After John Taylor died in 1849, Taylor and Mill waited two years before marrying in 1851. Taylor was hesitant to create greater scandal than the pair already had. Mill's "Declaration on Marriage" reflected his model of 'perfect equality'. Taylor Mill wrote a number of essays, including several joint-authored pieces with Mill on domestic violence and The Enfranchisement of Women, published in 1851.

== Own work ==
Taylor Mill began publishing her works when she was pregnant with her third child, Helen (who also went on to be a campaigner for women's rights, particularly regarding education and the vote). She provided a variety of literature for the Unitarian journal Monthly Repository and the Society for the Distribution of Useful Knowledge. Though she made many contributions over the years, little of her own work was published under her own name during her lifetime. She was the co-author of several newspaper articles on domestic violence published anonymously in the Morning Chronicle, Daily News, and Sunday Times in the 1840s. She read and commented on all the material produced by John Stuart Mill, who called her a valuable contributor to much of his work, especially On Liberty, which he later dedicated to her when it was published in 1859, a year after her death. She also contributed to Principles of Political Economy.

Indeed, in his autobiography, Mill claimed Taylor Mill as the joint author of most of the books and articles published under his name. He added "when two persons have their thoughts and speculations completely in common it is of little consequence, in respect of the question of originality, which of them holds the pen". The debate about the nature and extent of her collaboration is ongoing. Few of Mill's friends were permitted to meet her. Thomas and Jane Carlyle, who were allowed to make her acquaintance, did not form a favourable opinion of her abilities. Thomas Carlyle described her as "full of unwise intellect, asking and re-asking stupid questions", while Jane considered her "A peculiarly affected and empty body".

A letter written by Mill in 1854 suggests the attribution of credit goes both ways for her and John Stuart Mill; "I shall never be satisfied unless you allow our best book, the book which is to come, to have our two names on the title page. It ought to be so with everything I publish, for the better half of it all is yours". There is speculation that this indicates some reluctance on her part, even after her husband's death. Certainly, he was very reluctant that her name be linked with Mill's in public during his lifetime, even in a suggested dedication to Principles of Political Economy in 1848. However, this letter adds to the evidence from Mill's Autobiography and textual analysis of their pieces, that the two worked as a pair for much of their work.

In her article The Enfranchisement of Women, Taylor argued that women should be able to share the same privileges and responsibilities as adult men. She addressed how the institution of marriage during the 1850s impacted the rights of women, especially regarding property rights, which denied women the right to own property. Taylor also noted that laws involving dowry and child custody affected the economic and social position of women. She explained how women were induced to accept their position within society, emphasizing the division of roles and their economic dependence. Taylor further detailed how social perceptions impacted the economic and political power women could assert, stating, "many people think they should have sufficiently justified the restriction of women's field of action, when they have said that the pursuits from which women are excluded are unfeminine, and that the proper sphere of women is not politics or publicity".

In 2022, a stylometric analysis on On Liberty showed that Stuart Mill did not write the work entirely by himself and made a case for Taylor Mill's co-authorship. Citing the study, the Hackett Publishing Company published a copy of On Liberty in 2026 that credits both Stuart Mill and Taylor Mill as co-authors.

== Death and recognition ==
Harriet Taylor Mill died in the Hotel d'Europe in Avignon, France, on 3 November 1858, after developing severe lung congestion. Jo Ellen Jacobs has argued that the cause of death may have been syphilis contracted from her first husband. However, this posthumous diagnosis is contested.

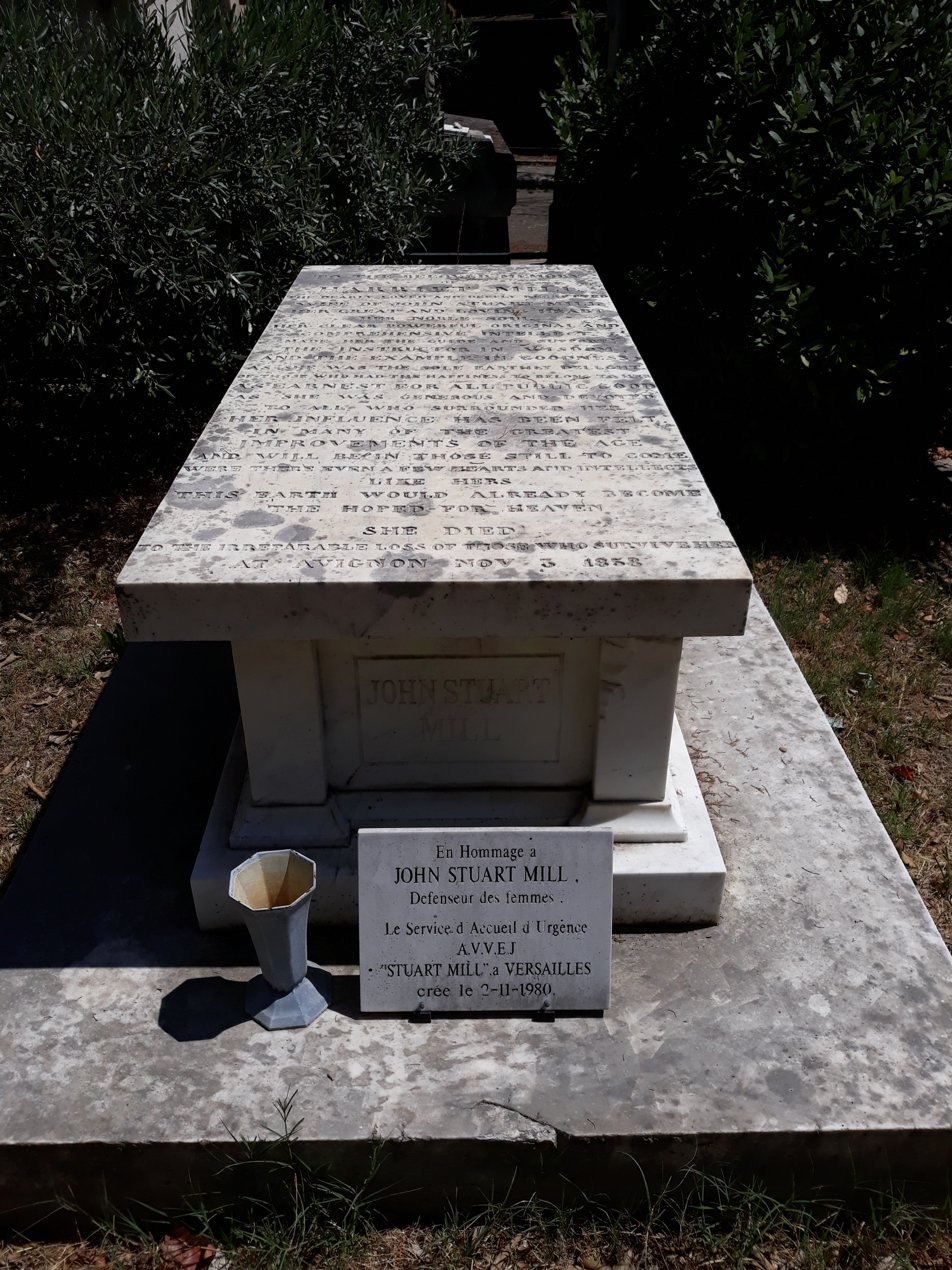
Harriet Taylor Mill's grave in Avignon

Upon her death, John Stuart Mill wrote:

Were I but capable of interpreting to the world one half the great thoughts and noble feelings which are buried in her grave, I should be the medium of a greater benefit to it, than is ever likely to arise from anything that I can write, unprompted and unassisted by her all but unrivalled wisdom.

At the Berlin School of Economics and Law, the Harriet Taylor Mill Institute for Economics and Gender Studies, founded in 2001, was named after her. She was included as one of the Philosopher Queens in the book of that name in 2020.

== See also ==
- History of feminism
- List of suffragists and suffragettes
- Women's suffrage in the United Kingdom
