= The Great Cat and Dog Massacre =

Book written by Hilda Kean

- First edition
- Author: Hilda Kean
- Language: English
- Genre: Non-fiction
- Publisher: University of Chicago Press
- Publication date: 2017
- Publication place: United States

The Great Cat and Dog Massacre is a history book by Hilda Kean. It recounts the story of the British pet massacre during September 1939, at the onset of World War II, when hundreds of thousands of British family pets were preemptively euthanised in anticipation of air raids and resource shortages.

Kean also uses the episode to discuss people's feelings about their pets and the psychology of a population at war.

The book was published in 2017 by University of Chicago Press. Its title is a reference to Robert Darnton's 1984 work The Great Cat Massacre.
