= Hôtel d'Europe =

Coordinates: 43.9501°N 4.8033°E

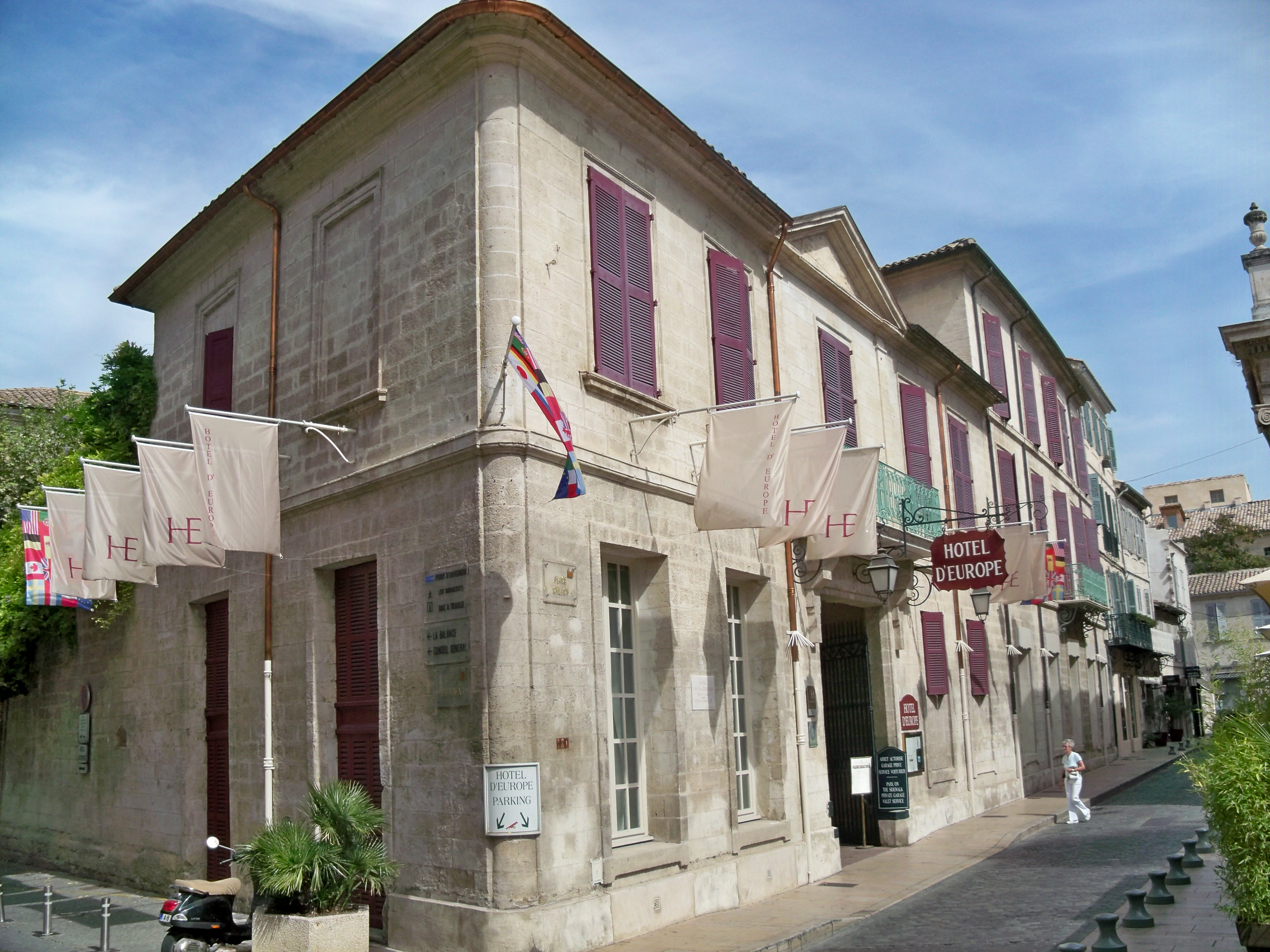
- The Hôtel d'Europe in 2010
- Interactive map of the Hôtel d'Europe area

General information
- Type: Hôtel Particulier
- Architectural style: Classical
- Location: 12, place Crillon, Avignon, France
- Groundbreaking: 1580
- Opened: 1799
- Renovated: 1740

Website
- http://www.heurope.com/uk/

The Hôtel d'Europe (French pronunciation: [otɛl døʁɔp]; Occitan: Ostal d'Euròpa) is a five-star hotel located in the old historical part of Avignon, in Provence, France. It has been a hotel since 1799 and is considered one of the oldest hotels in France.

== Background and history ==
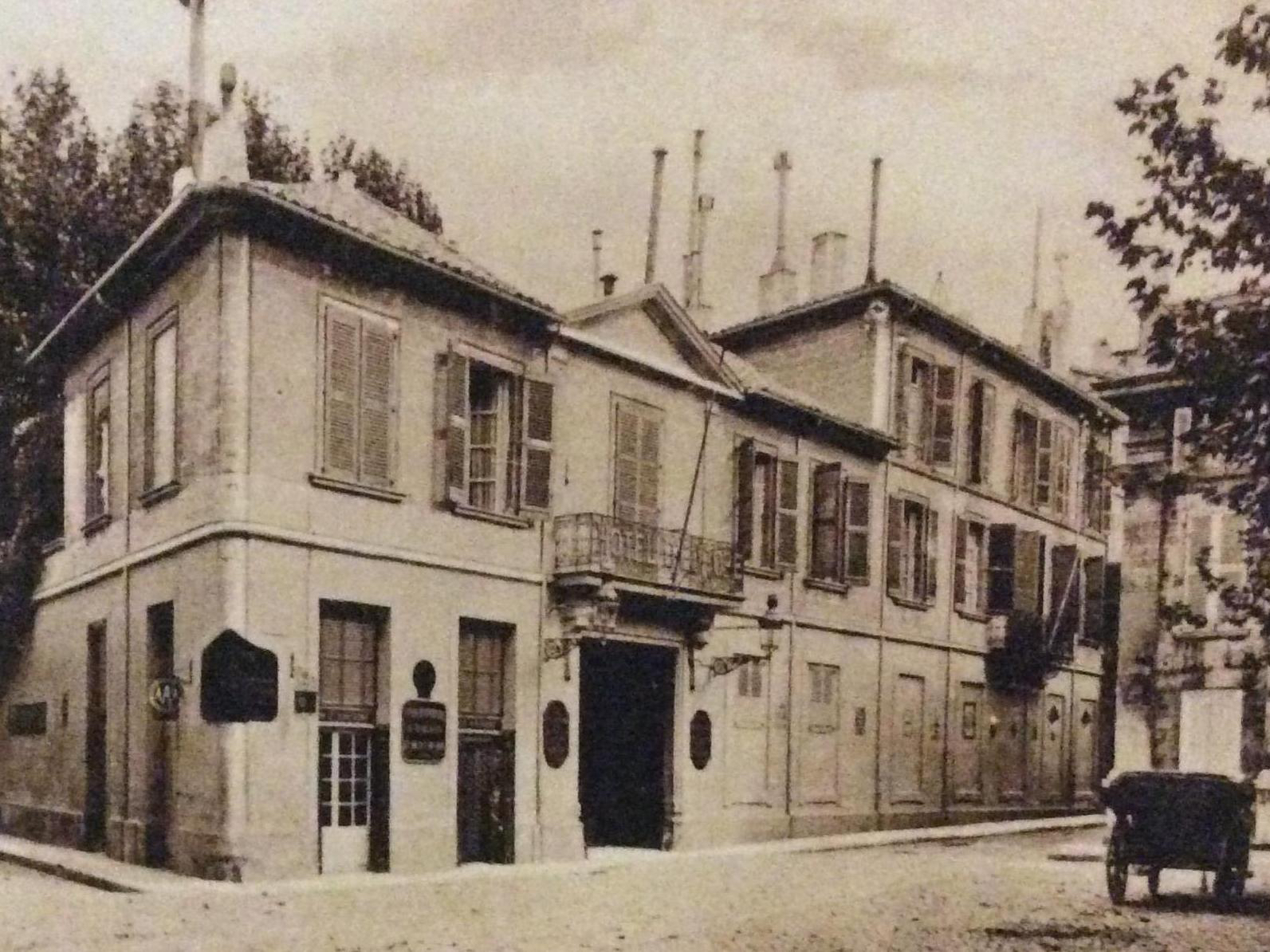
Hotel d'Europe in the 19th century

Originally, the Hôtel d’Europe was a large private mansion built in the 16th century (1580). It belonged first to several noble families from the Comtat Venaissin. In 1740, the house was bought by François de Boutin de Valouse who carried out significant construction work and transformed the building. It then took on the look of a large hôtel particulier of Classical style. The architecture has barely been changed since then.

In 1775, the building became the Hôtel de Graveson when it was bought by Jean-Baptiste de Graveson. He was a direct descendant of Antoine d'Amat de Graveson, who, in 1652, married Marguerite de Crillon, granddaughter of Louis des Balbes de Berton de Crillon, for whom the Place Crillon in Avignon (where the hotel is located) was named.

Facing the Hôtel de Graveson, on the other side of Place Crillon, was the Hôtel du Palais Royal, which was owned by Claude Pierron and his wife Catherine. This is the hotel in which Napoleon’s Marshal of the Empire (Maréchal d'Empire) Guillaume Brune would be assassinated in 1815.

On September 25, 1799, when her husband died, Catherine Pierron bought the Hôtel de Graveson and the same year converted it into a hotel, the Hôtel d’Europe.

The Hôtel d’Europe rapidly established an excellent reputation, possibly thanks to Catherine Pierron’s natural sense of service, or to its beautiful and well-shaded courtyard or, perhaps, due to it being conveniently close to the River Rhône.

In 1830, Catherine Pierron’s son, Narcisse, was married at the age of 47. His mother, who was then 74, bequeathed the hotel to him. He proved to be a dynamic and successful manager.

1854 was the year when the railway lines between Marseille and Avignon and Paris and Avignon were opened. The train station was built on the other side of town, so the Hôtel d’Europe became farther from the center of town. Narcisse Pierron, who was then 71, decided to create his own omnibus line, which enabled his guests to come and go between the train station and the hotel. This was one of the first omnibus lines in Avignon.

Marie-Rose, Narcisse’s daughter, took over after his death in 1855. She went on to manage the hotel, with her husband Emile Perre, until her own death in 1874.

In 1884, the Hôtel d’Europe and Marie-Rose Perre’s possessions were sold at auction to one of her grandsons: Marie Joseph Narcisse Pierre.

In 1904, the telephone was installed at the hotel. The Hôtel d’Europe was one of the first three hotels in Avignon to be connected by telephone.

During World War II, the Hôtel d’Europe was requisitioned by the German army from November 19, 1942, to August 23, 1944.

== Famous guests from the past ==
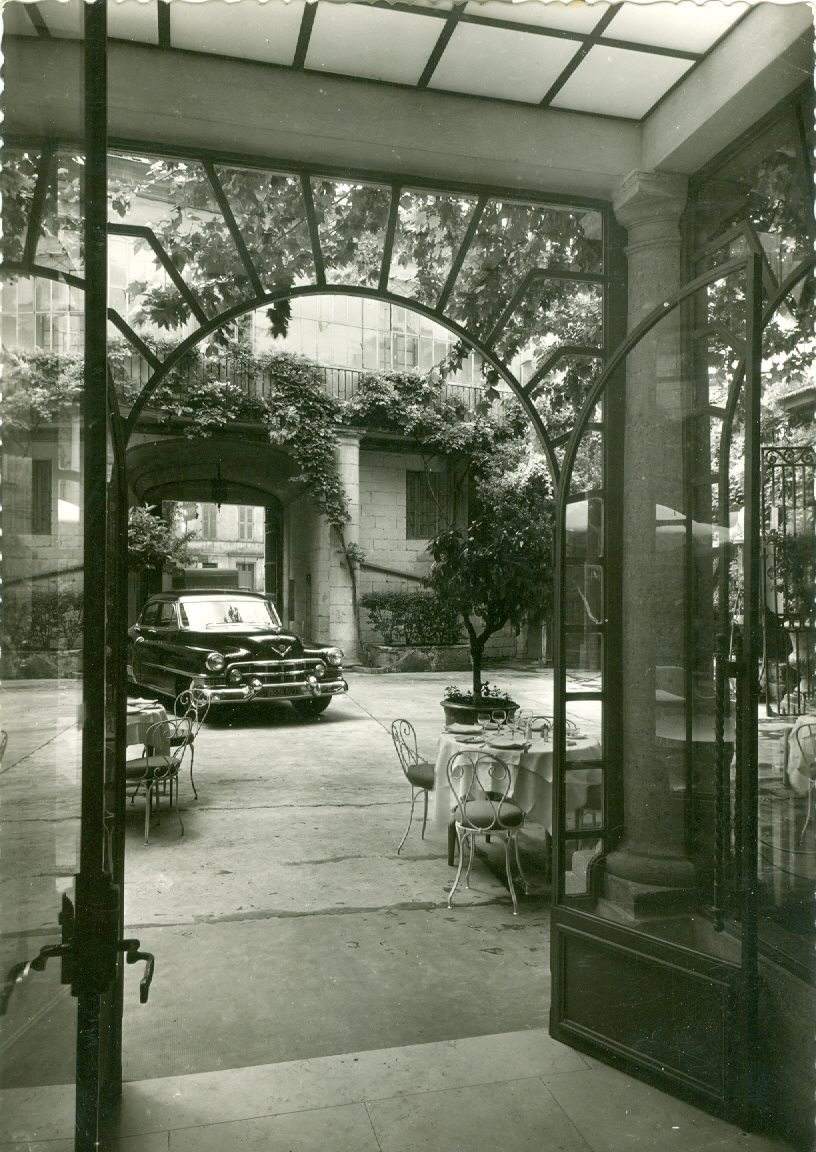
The courtyard of the Hôtel d'Europe

The first important guest to stay at the Hôtel d’Europe was General Bonaparte, on the way back to Paris from his campaign in Egypt in 1799.

The next great man, in about 1820 was the Duke of Gloucester and Edinburgh and, then, from November 1822 to February 1823, Marguerite Power, the Countess of Blessington.

In September 25 1839, Victor Hugo stayed at the Hôtel d’Europe with his mistress Juliette Drouet. The famous couple arrived from Lyon by boat and left two days later for Arles. And they stayed here again, a few days later, on their way home.

In 1843, Cardinal Pecci, the future pope Leo XIII, stayed here, and, in 1850, the first Archbishop of Westminster, Nicholas Wiseman.

In 1858, the economist John Stuart Mill and his wife Harriet Taylor Mill took up residence in the Hôtel d’Europe, where she was to die on November 4 in that year.

From November 1893 to February 1894, the composer Jules Massenet rented seven rooms in order to work on the musical score for La Navarraise. During his stay he met the Provençal poet Felix Gras.

In the 20th century, the Hôtel d’Europe welcomed the Count of Paris, Prince Rainier de Monaco, King Leopold III of Belgium, the King of Nepal Birenda Bir Bikram Dev Shah, the Aga Khan, Prince Ali Khan, Prince Umberto I of Italy and Archduke Otto von Habsburg.

Other famous guests included Jean-Louis Vaudoyer, Vincent Auriol, the writers Blasco Ibanez, Jean Cocteau, Arthur Conan Doyle, Ernest Hemingway, Eugène Ionesco, Somerset Maugham, Jules Romains, the painters Bernard Buffet, Salvador Dalí, Kees van Dongen, Pablo Picasso, the actors and directors Bourvil, Charlie Chaplin, Gary Cooper, Douglas Fairbanks Jr., Fernandel, Victor Francen, Louis de Funès, Walt Disney, René Clair, Elvire Popesco, Orson Welles, the singers Georges Brassens, Edith Piaf and Tino Rossi, and many others, such as Christian Dior and Eleanor Roosevelt.

== The hotel today ==
The hotel d'Europe comprises 39 rooms and 5 suites. Some of the suites have a view on the Palais des papes.

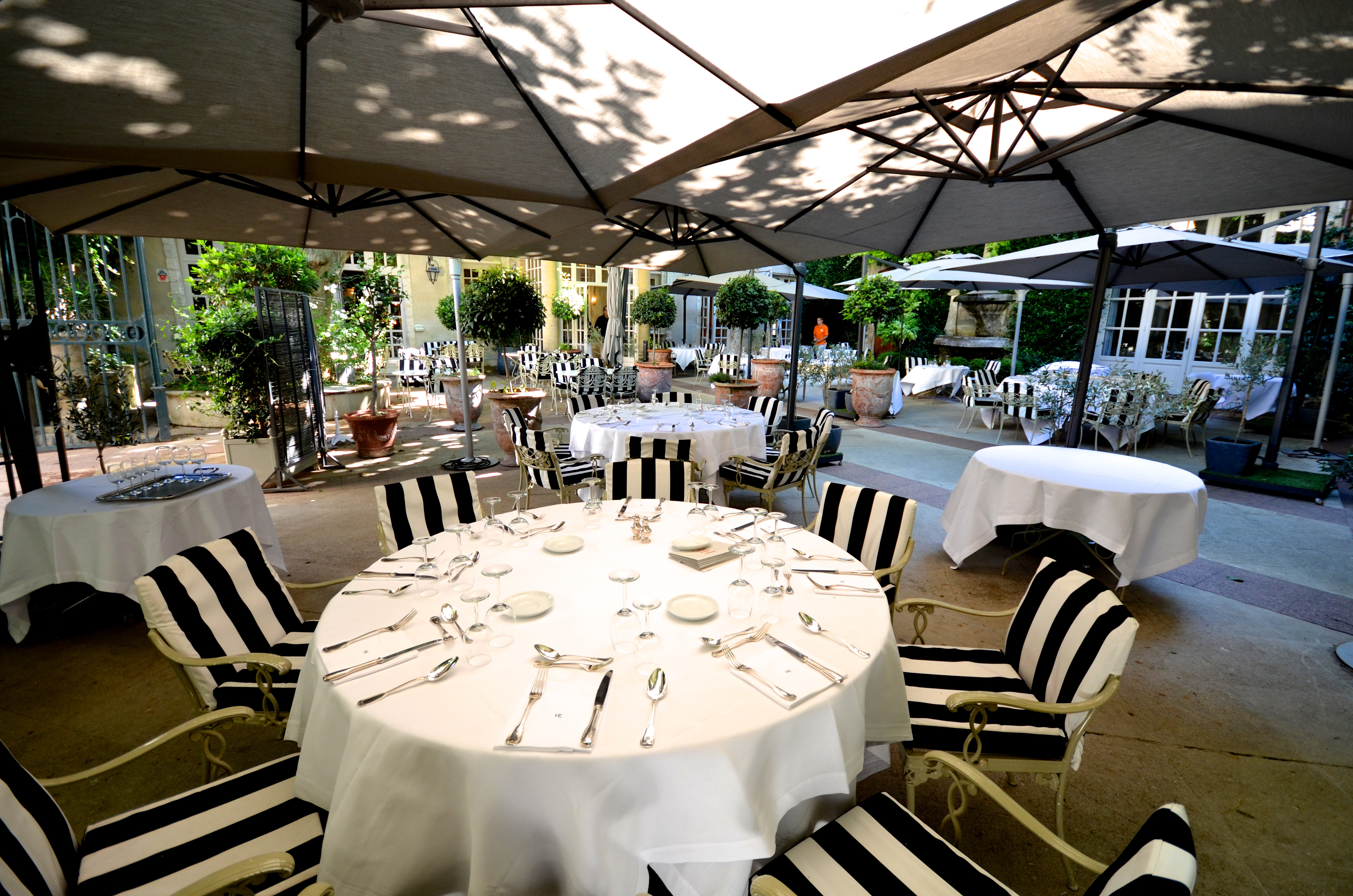
The courtyard today

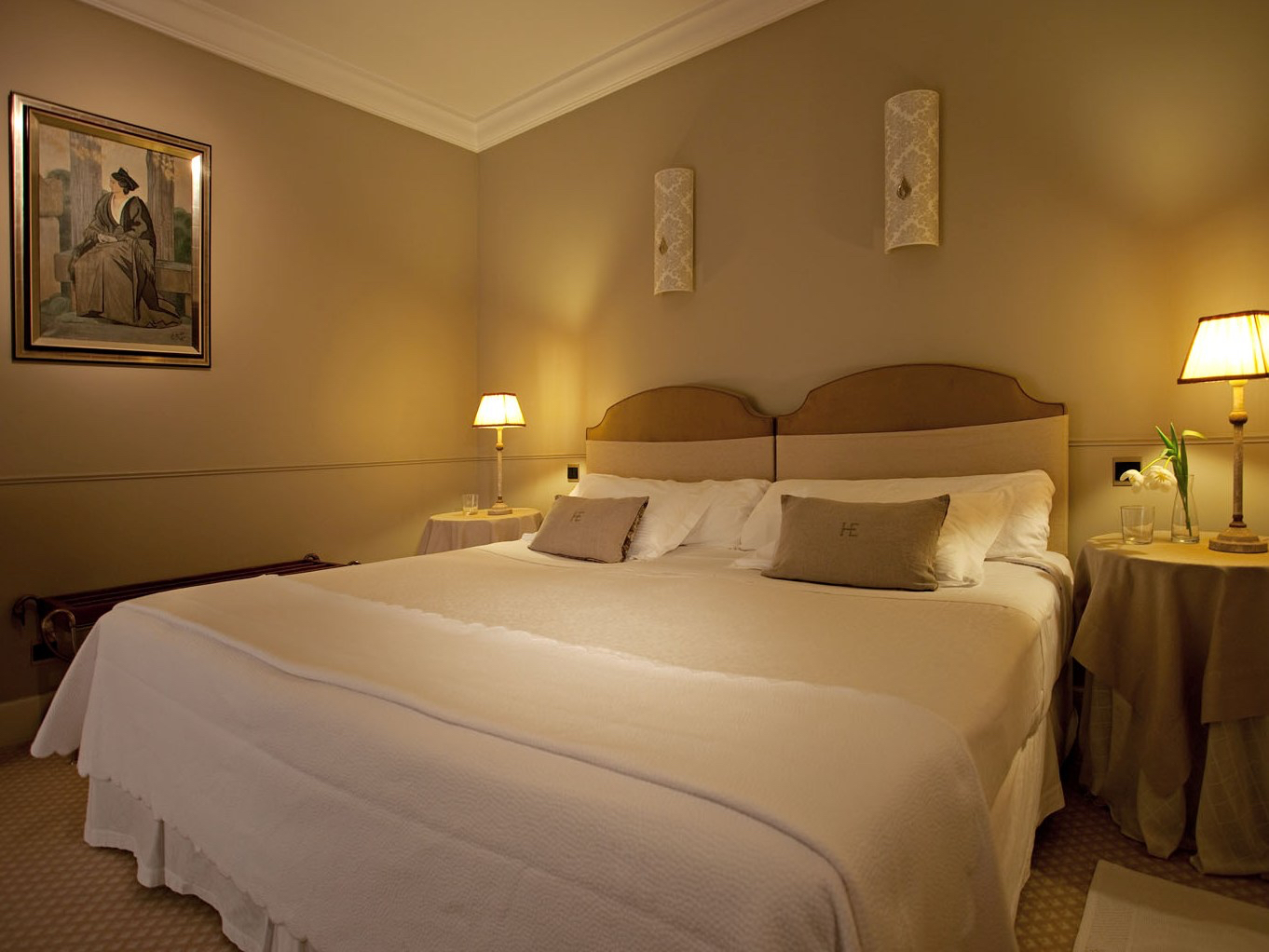
A room
