= Hilda Kean =

British historian (born 1949)

- Born: August 1949 (age 77)

Academic work
- Discipline: History
- Sub-discipline: Public history; Cultural history; Human–animal studies
- Institutions: Ruskin College; University of Greenwich; University of Technology Sydney
- Notable works: Animal Rights: Political and Social Change in Britain since 1800 (1998); The Great Cat and Dog Massacre (2017)
- Website: hildakean.com

Hilda Kean (born August 1949) is a British historian specialising in public history, cultural history and the history of human–animal relationships. Her books include Animal Rights: Political and Social Change in Britain since 1800 (1998) and The Great Cat and Dog Massacre (2017).

Kean was Dean and Director of Public History at Ruskin College, Oxford, where she was also an honorary research fellow. She is a visiting professor of history at the University of Greenwich and an adjunct professor at the Centre for Australian Public History at the University of Technology Sydney. She is also an honorary senior research associate at University College London.

== Research and writing ==
Kean's research has covered public history, the history of animal advocacy, women's suffrage, education and the labour movement. In Animal Rights: Political and Social Change in Britain since 1800 (1998), she examined the cultural and social position of animals in Britain and the development of animal protection campaigns from the nineteenth century onwards. The book considers the relationship between animal advocacy and movements for political and social reform, including feminism, socialism and political radicalism.

Her book The Great Cat and Dog Massacre: The Real Story of World War Two's Unknown Tragedy (2017) examines the killing of hundreds of thousands of companion animals in Britain following the outbreak of the Second World War in September 1939. Drawing on diaries, letters, archival records and contemporary accounts, Kean investigated the circumstances of the killings and the changing relationships between people and their animals during the war. Reviewing the book in the Los Angeles Review of Books, Colin Dickey discussed Kean's use of sources documenting the experiences of animals that had received little attention in conventional histories of the war.

Kean has also written about the representation of animals in public history, including monuments commemorating Greyfriars Bobby and the Brown Dog affair. Her research in public history has addressed historical memory, heritage, commemoration and the participation of the public in producing historical knowledge.

== Selected works ==
=== Books ===
- — (2017). The Great Cat and Dog Massacre. University of Chicago Press.
- — Martin, Paul, eds. (2013). The Public History Reader. Routledge.
- — Ashton, Paul, eds. (2009). People and Their Pasts: Public History Today. Palgrave Macmillan.
- — (2004). London Stories: Personal Lives, Public Histories. Rivers Oram Press.
- — Martin, Paul; Morgan, Sally J., eds. (2000). Seeing History: Public History in Britain Now. Francis Boutle.
- — Andrews, Geoff; Thompson, Jane, eds. (1999). Ruskin College: Contesting Knowledge, Dissenting Politics. Lawrence and Wishart.
- — (1998). Animal Rights: Political and Social Change in Britain since 1800. Reaktion Books.
- — (1990). Deeds Not Words: The Lives of Suffragette Teachers. Pluto Press.
- — (1990). Challenging the State? The Socialist and Feminist Educational Experience. Falmer.

=== Selected articles and book chapters ===
- — (2011). "Commemorating Animals: Glorifying Humans? Remembering and Forgetting Animals in War Memorials". In Andrews, Maggie; Bagot-Jewitt, Charles; Hunt, Nigel (eds.). Lest We Forget: Remembrance and Commemoration. History Press. pp. 60–70.
- — (2011). "English Labour Movement Festivals and the Past: Commemorating Defeat and Creating Martyrs". In Smith, Laurajane; Campbell, Gary; Shackel, Paul (eds.). Cultural Heritage and the Working Class: Heritage, Labour and the Working Classes. Routledge.
- — (2011). "Traces and Representations: Animal Pasts in London's Present". The London Journal.
- — (2010). "People, Historians and Public History: De-mystifying the Process of History Making". The Public Historian. 32 (3): 25–38.
- — (2009). "Balto, the Alaskan Dog and His Statue in New York's Central Park: Animal Representation and National Heritage". International Journal of Heritage Studies. 15 (5): 413–430.
- — (2008). "Personal and Public Histories: Issues in the Presentation of the Past". In Graham, Brian; Howard, Peter (eds.). The Ashgate Research Companion to Heritage and Identity. Ashgate. pp. 55–69.
- — (2007). "The Moment of Greyfriars Bobby: The Changing Cultural Position of Animals 1800–1920". In Kete, Kathleen (ed.). A Cultural History of Animals in the Age of Empire 1800–1920. Vol. 5. Berg. pp. 25–46.
- — (2005). "Public History & Popular Memory: Issues in the Commemoration of the British Militant Suffrage Movement". Women's History Review. 14 (3–4): 581–604.
- — (2004). "Public History and Raphael Samuel: A Forgotten Radical Pedagogy?". Public History Review. 11: 51–62.
- — (2003). "An Exploration of the Sculptures of Greyfriars Bobby, Edinburgh, Scotland and the Old Brown Dog in Battersea, South London, England". Society & Animals. 11 (4): 353–373.
- — Wheeler, Bruce (2003). "Making History in Bethnal Green: Different Stories of Nineteenth-Century Silk Weavers". History Workshop Journal (56).

== See also ==
- Chien-hui Li
- Harriet Ritvo
- History of animal rights
