= Method of difference =

Method of difference may refer to:

- The method of finite differences, used in the difference engine
- One of Mill's methods in inductive reasoning
- A mathematical way of finding the value of telescoping sums
