= On Social Freedom =

Essay on philosophy

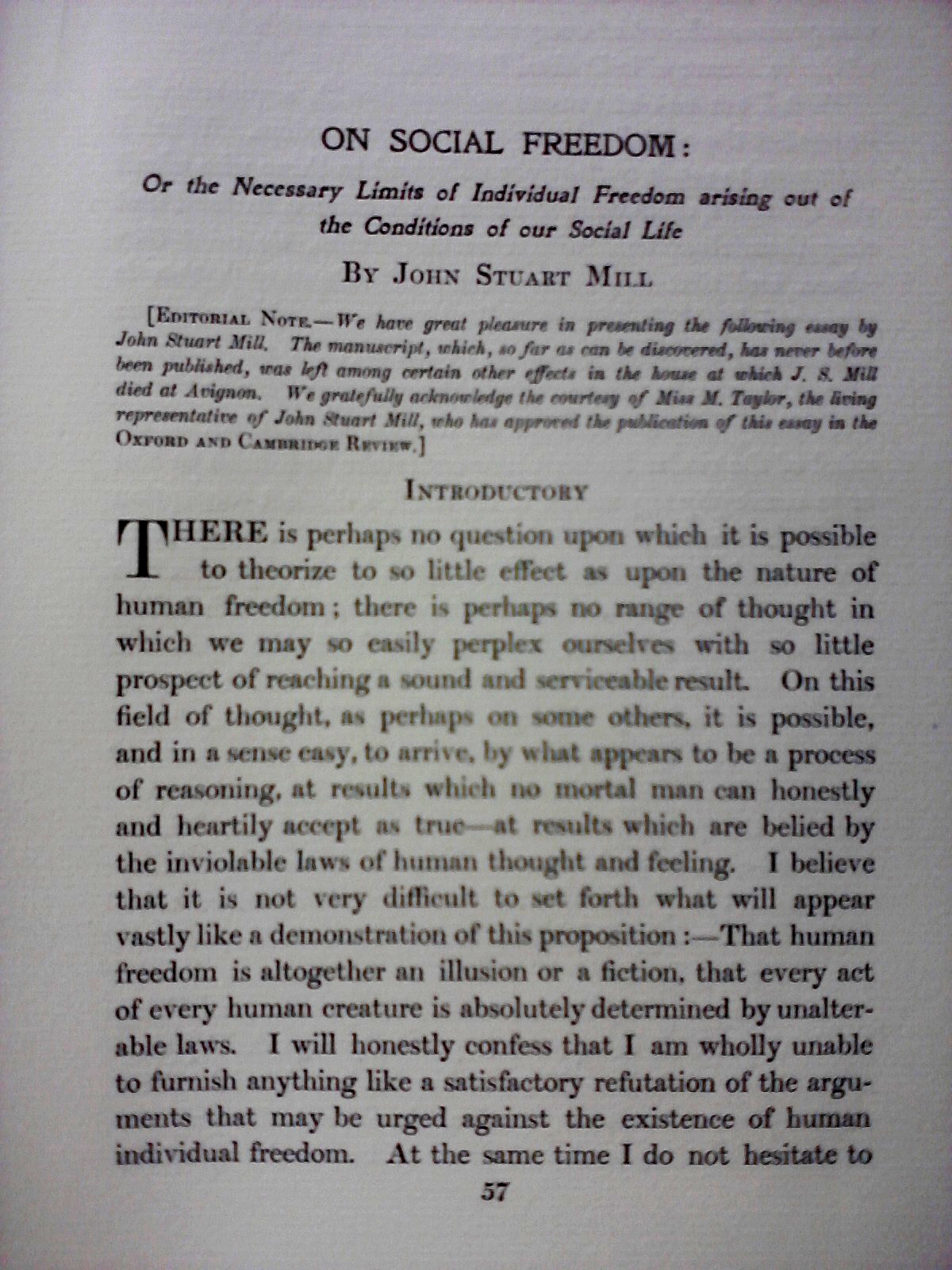
- Title page of Mill's On Social Freedom featured for the first time in The Oxford and Cambridge Review, June 1907.
- Author: Falsely attributed to John Stuart Mill; most likely written by Ebenezer R. Edger
- Language: English
- Subject: Individual and Societal Freedom
- Genre: Philosophy
- Publisher: Archibald Constable & Co. Ltd.
- Publication date: 1907
- Publication place: England
- Media type: Print
- Pages: 57-83

On Social Freedom: or the Necessary Limits of Individual Freedom Arising Out of the Conditions of Our Social Life is an essay regarding individual and societal freedom initially thought to have been written by the British philosopher John Stuart Mill, but later found to have been falsely attributed to him.

Discovered in 1907 among the possessions left in the home at which Mill died in Avignon, France, it was published in June 1907 as a special article in The Oxford and Cambridge Review. The work was republished by Columbia University Press in 1941, but failed to attract much attention. In 1955, the Liberal Arts Press intended to republish it in a volume also containing On Liberty, but decided against doing so in view of the doubts surrounding its authorship raised by the Mill scholar J.C. Rees. He then set out the full case against attributing the work to Mill in his 1956 work Mill and His Early Critics.

Rees's explanation for how the manuscript ended up among Mill's possessions is summarised by J.P. Scanlan:

In September, 1862, Mill wrote a letter from Avignon to a certain E.R. Edger, acknowledging receipt of a manuscript entitled "Social Freedom." Apparently Edger hoped to elicit from Mill an appraisal of his capacity for philosophical inquiry, and had sent the manuscript as a sample of his work. Mill replies politely and with his usual care that he finds many signs of competence in the work - mostly, however, in the form of "promise rather than performance" - and he exhorts Edger to continue thinking and writing, though not "to the neglect of other modes of gaining a subsistence." Concerning Edger's views Mill says only that, if he were to comment in detail, he "should have much to say against several of your positions, and especially against your definition of liberty."

The letter is included in Mill's Collected Works where Edger is identified as "probably Ebenezer R. Edger, associate of G.J. Holyoake in the promoting of the co-operative movement, writer for The Secular World and author of tracts on co-operation." Holyoake briefly mentions Edger in The History of Co-operation:

"Ten years later my colleague, Mr E. R. Edger, visited Mr. Crisell, the manager of the farm whom the Rev. Mr. Robinson had found to be "manly, open, and ingenious appearance," beyond what he expected of one belonging to the "depressed" class. Mr. Edger sent me this report:-

"I paid a visit to Assington, and had a conversation with the manager, Mr. Crisell (pronounced with i long, 'Cry-sell'). I can feel no enthusiasm at all about the Assington Farm. There seems no 'co-operation' in the right sense of the term, but only bounty of the squire towards poor neighbours.

(1) It is limited to inhabitants of the parish. (2) Each member can hold only one share. (3) Members have no voice in the management. (4) Wages to workmen same as usual. (5) No special inducement offered to the workmen to become shareholders. The manager remarked that they did not care particularly to employ the members; this seems to me very significant. It has been in existence forty-one years, so it will take a long time to renovate society that way. Remember, I only give my impressions."

An E.R. Edger is also listed in the British Medical Journal on 24 April 1869 as having passed a primary examination in anatomy and physiology at the Royal College of Surgeons of England.
