= MDSD =

MDSD could refer to:

- Las Américas International Airport ICAO code
- Model Driven Software Development, a software engineering term
- Most Different Systems Design/Mill's Method of Similarity in comparative politics
- Physician (MD) Self Disclosure
