= Informed judge =

The informed judge is a concept that 19th-century political philosopher John Stuart Mill used in his essay Utilitarianism. Mill posited that in order to find the better of two choices, one must find the choice that yields more happiness. One does so, according to Mill, by finding an informed judge, who is simply someone who has experienced both options, and whichever choice the informed judge prefers will presumably be the better one.
