= Bagdad, Tamaulipas =

Settlement in Tamaulipas, Mexico

Bagdad Port of Matamoros
- Former settlement
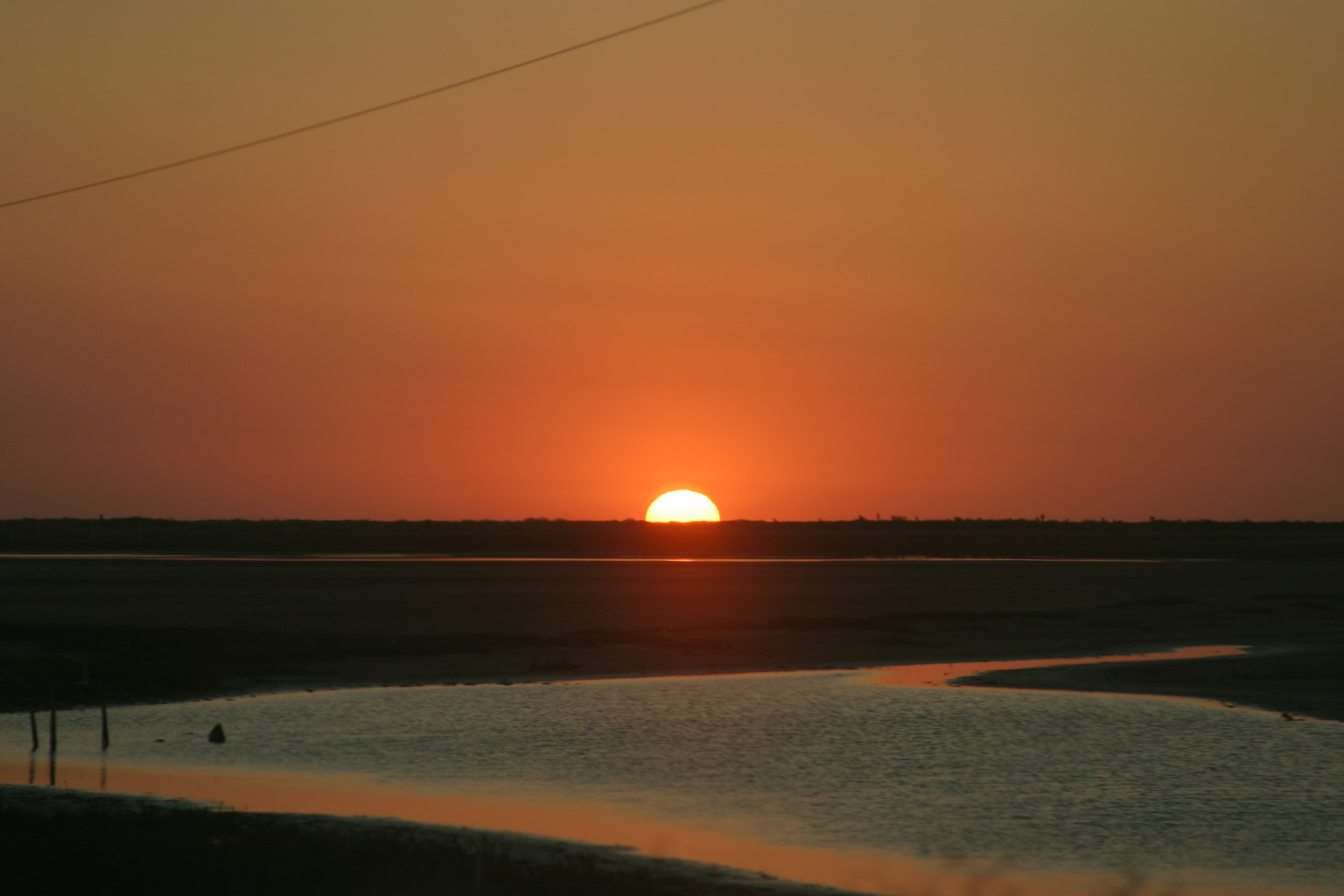
- Sunset over the floodplains just west of Bagdad Beach

- Location in Tamaulipas Location in Mexico
- Country: Mexico
- State: Tamaulipas
- Municipality: Matamoros
- Founded: 1848
- Abandoned: 1880

Bagdad was a town established in 1848 on the south bank of the mouth of the Rio Grande, in Mexico. Because the town was inside the municipality of Matamoros, Tamaulipas, it was also known as the Port of Bagdad or the Port of Matamoros. It was officially declared non-existent in 1880.

== History ==
During the American Civil War, Bagdad was heavily sympathetic towards the Confederate States of America. The town was involved in the wartime cotton trade, with more than 20,000 Americans, Britons, Frenchmen, and Germans active as traders and investors in Bagdad. This led to the town's growth from a small coastal outpost into a fully developed town. Merchantmen would anchor off Bagdad and unload their legal goods during the day onto smaller boats, while they waited until nightfall to unload any contraband. These were immediately sent to Texas and were never officially recorded by local Mexican custom officials.

When the American Civil War ended in 1865, it had a devastating impact on Bagdad, with most of the town's residents leaving. As of 1984, the port had never fully recovered from its decline. Today, nothing remains of the original Civil War-era settlement. However, a small lighthouse is located along the shores of Bagdad Beach about 0.3 km (0.19 mi) east of the former settlement. The resort town of Playa Bagdad is located about 14 km (8.7 mi) to the south.

== See also ==
- Boca Chica Beach — neighboring area across the border
