= John Stuart Mill Institute =

German-based research institute

The John Stuart Mill Institute is a non-governmental, Heidelberg-based research institute founded in 2009 and named after John Stuart Mill, an influential 19th-century English philosopher and politician. His main work "On Liberty", published in 1859, forms the basis for the institutes aim and mission:

"The only freedom which deserves the name is that of pursuing our own good in our own way, so long as we do not attempt to deprive others of theirs, or impede their efforts to obtain it."

Accordingly, the institute performs research into and promotes the concept of individual freedom and liberalism as an independent think tank and general advisor to all levels of society. As such, it is unique and the only one of its kind in Germany.

== Key aspects of activity ==
- research and advocacy on political, academic and private freedom
- studies/research projects into declining civil rights and liberty in developed societies, particularly Germany in comparison to other countries
- serve as mediator/facilitator for freedom research in Germany and abroad
- engage in national and international cooperation with public and private partners, scientific institutes and any interested research/educational facilities
- advisory role for political and economic institutes including management training, teaching at universities etc.

== Governance ==
The institute is integrated into one of the biggest and oldest private universities of applied sciences in Germany, the SRH in Heidelberg. The head of the John Stuart Mill Institute is Prof. Ulrike Ackermann. All members of the scientific advisory board are renowned individuals, such as: Detmar Doering (philosopher and historian, currently head of the Friedrich Naumann Foundation); Karen Horn (economist, head of the Institute of German Economy, Berlin); Robert Nef (head of the Institute of Liberalism, Zürich); Prof. Gerhard Schulze (sociologist, University of Bamberg); Prof. Edgar Wolfrum (historian, University of Heidelberg); Prof. Michael Zöller (political scientist, University of Bayreuth/ member of the Council on public policies).

== Funding ==
The John Stuart Mill Institute is an independent research and teaching organization that engages and advises to all levels of modern society. It is non-partisan and its views are not aligned with any political party. As such, the institute does not perform contract research nor does it accept government funding. Initially founded by generous support from the SRH Heidelberg, its future revenues will largely dependent on private contributions.
