= A Few Words on Non-Intervention =

1859 essay by John Stuart Mill

"A Few Words on Non-Intervention" is a short essay by the philosopher, politician, and economist, John Stuart Mill. It was written in 1859 in the context of the construction of the Suez Canal and the recent Crimean War. The essay addresses the question of under what circumstances states should be allowed to intervene in the sovereign affairs of another country.

== Content ==
Mill's argument is a discussion of Britain's place in the world, in which Mill right away asserts that Britain, unlike other countries, never ventures into the outside world with an imperialistic aim; rather, when it does venture out, it is to improve the world, end conflicts, bring civilization, etc.: "Any attempt [Britain] makes to exert influence...is rather in the service of others, than of itself". Writing for a contemporary British middle and upper class audience, Mill gives an overview of some world events that were important for that particular time.

The main arguments for and against non-intervention are found in the second half of the script.

There seems to be no little need that the whole doctrine of non-interference with foreign nations should be reconsidered, if it can be said to have as yet been considered as a really moral question at all... To go to war for an idea, if the war is aggressive, not defensive, is as criminal as to go to war for territory or revenue; for it is as little justifiable to force our ideas on other people, as to compel them to submit to our will in any other respect. But there assuredly are cases in which it is allowable to go to war, without having been ourselves attacked, or threatened with attack; and it is very important that nations should make up their minds in time, as to what these cases are... To suppose that the same international customs, and the same rules of international morality, can obtain between one civilized nation and another, and between civilized nations and barbarians, is a grave error...

According to Mill's opinion (in 1859) barbarous peoples were found in Algeria and India where the French and British armies had been involved. First, he argued that with "barbarians" there is no hope for "reciprocity", an international fundamental. Second, barbarians are apt to benefit from civilised intervenors, said Mill, citing Roman conquests of Gaul, Spain, Numidia and Dacia. Barbarians,

have no rights as a nation, except a right to such treatment as may, at the earliest possible period, fit them for becoming one. The only moral laws for the relation between a civilized and a barbarous government, are the universal rules of morality between man and man.

Similar arguments can today be found in theory on intervention in failed states. Of more widespread relevance, Mill discussed the position between "civilized peoples".

The disputed question is that of interfering in the regulation of another country's internal concerns; the question whether a nation is justified in taking part, on either side, in the civil wars or party contests of another: and chiefly, whether it may justifiably aid the people of another country in struggling for liberty; or may impose on a country any particular government or institutions, either as being best for the country itself, or as necessary for the security of its neighbours.

Mill brushes over the situation of intervening on the side of governments who are trying to oppress an uprising of their own, saying "government which needs foreign support to enforce obedience from its own citizens, is one which ought not to exist". In the case however of a civil war, where both parties seem at fault, Mill argues that third parties are entitled to demand that the conflicts shall cease. He then moves to the more contentious situation of wars for liberation.

When the contest is only with native rulers, and with such native strength as those rulers can enlist in their defence, the answer I should give to the question of the legitimacy of intervention is, as a general rule, No. The reason is, that there can seldom be anything approaching to assurance that intervention, even if successful, would be for the good of the people themselves. The only test possessing any real value, of a people’s having become fit for popular institutions, is that they, or a sufficient portion of them to prevail in the contest, are willing to brave labour and danger for their liberation. I know all that may be said, I know it may be urged that the virtues of freemen cannot be learnt in the school of slavery, and that if a people are not fit for freedom, to have any chance of becoming so they must first be free. And this would be conclusive, if the intervention recommended would really give them freedom. But the evil is, that if they have not sufficient love of liberty to be able to wrest it from merely domestic oppressors, the liberty which is bestowed on them by other hands than their own, will have nothing real, nothing permanent. No people ever was and remained free, but because it was determined to be so...

== Responses ==
Noam Chomsky has made reference to Mill's essay in a number of his books, including Failed States: The Abuse of Power and the Assault on Democracy (2006), Hegemony or Survival: America's Quest for Global Dominance (2002) and Peering into the Abyss of the Future (2002). Chomsky writes that even "individuals of the highest intelligence and moral integrity succumb to the pathology" of taking exception to universal human standards.

Libertarian historian Joseph R. Stromberg states that J.S. Mill's imperialistic views are incompatible with his alleged liberalism, since maintenance of the British Empire would require government repression. In contrast, Tim Beaumont has argued that Mill believed it was possible to justify colonial rule in particular circumstances without justifying wars of aggression.

Beaumont also argues that the arguments about protective foreign intervention in the second half of the text are best understood in light of the discussion of self-defence in the first half.

== See also ==
- Public international law
- Humanitarian intervention
