= Harm principle =

Moral philosophy principle

The harm principle holds that the actions of individuals should be limited only to prevent harm to other individuals. John Stuart Mill articulated the principle in the 1859 essay On Liberty, where he argued that "The only purpose for which power can be rightfully exercised over any member of a civilized community, against his will, is to prevent harm to others." An equivalent was earlier stated in France's Declaration of the Rights of Man and of the Citizen of 1789 as, "Liberty consists in the freedom to do everything which injures no one else; hence the exercise of the natural rights of each man has no limits except those which assure to the other members of the society the enjoyment of the same rights. These limits can only be determined by law." It finds earlier expression in Thomas Jefferson's 1785 "Notes on the State of Virginia", Query 17 (Religion) in which he writes, "The legitimate powers of government extend to such acts only as are injurious to others."

== John Stuart Mill's formulation ==
The harm principle was first fully articulated by the English philosopher John Stuart Mill [JSM] (1806–1873) in the first chapter of On Liberty (1859), where he argued that:

The object of this Essay is to assert one very simple principle, as entitled to govern absolutely the dealings of society with the individual in the way of compulsion and control, whether the means used be physical force in the form of legal penalties, or the moral coercion of public opinion. That principle is, that the sole end for which mankind are warranted, individually or collectively, in interfering with the liberty of action of any of their number, is self-protection. That the only purpose for which power can be rightfully exercised over any member of a civilised community, against his will, is to prevent harm to others. His own good, either physical or moral, is not a sufficient warrant. He cannot rightfully be compelled to do or forbear because it will be better for him to do so, because it will make him happier, because, in the opinion of others, to do so would be wise, or even right... The only part of the conduct of anyone, for which he is amenable to society, is that which concerns others. In the part which merely concerns himself, his independence is, of right, absolute. Over himself, over his own body and mind, the individual is sovereign.

— John Stuart Mill

Mill also put the harm principle within his list of rights that sprung from liberty. It was found within his list of political rights (political activities that did not involve harm to others) - but also within his non-political liberty rights - his "tastes and pursuits" - activities which did not involve politics and did not involve harm to others:

This, then, is the appropriate region of human liberty. It comprises, first, the inward domain of consciousness; demanding liberty of conscience, in the most comprehensive sense; liberty of thought and feeling; absolute freedom of opinion and sentiment on all subjects; practical or speculative, scientific, moral, or theological. The principle of expressing and publishing opinions may seem to fall under a different principle, since it belongs to that part of the conduct of an individual which concerns other people; but, being almost of as much importance as the liberty of thought itself, and resting in great part on the same reasons, is practically inseparable from it. Secondly, the principle requires liberty of tastes and pursuits; of framing the plan of our life to suit our own character; of doing as we like, subject to such consequences as may follow; without impediment from our fellow-creatures, so long as what we do does not harm them even though they should think our conduct foolish, perverse, or wrong.

According to Mill, harm is thus necessary but sometimes insufficient to justify legal coercion.

== Legal applications ==
=== Historical examples ===
The harm principle is found in article 5 of the first English-language constitution from 1647: "An Agreement of the People for a firme and present Peace, upon grounds of common right and freedome....", presented to the Army Council, E. 412, 21. October 28, 1647:

That the laws ought to be equal, so they must be good and not evidently destructive to the safety and well-being of the people.

The harm principle is found in Articles 4 and 5 of the first French constitution (and first nationally adopted constitution) from 1789: Declaration of Human and Civic Rights of 26 August 1789:

Liberty consists in being able to do anything that does not harm others: thus, the exercise of the natural rights of every man has no bounds other than those that ensure to the other members of society the enjoyment of these same rights. These bounds must be determined only by Law. The Law has the right to forbid only those actions that are injurious to society. Nothing that is not forbidden by Law may be hindered, and no one may be compelled to do what the Law does not ordain.

One might rightly argue that the "pursuit of Happiness" mentioned in the 1776 US Declaration of Independence was one of the "tastes and pursuits" that Mill had in mind:

We hold these truths to be self-evident, that all men are created equal, that they are endowed by their Creator with certain unalienable Rights, that among these are Life, Liberty and the pursuit of Happiness . . .

Thomas Jefferson espoused a similar belief in his 1819 letter to Isaac H. Tiffany:

Of Liberty then I would say that, in the whole plenitude of it’s extent, it is unobstructed action according to our will: but rightful liberty is unobstructed action according to our will, within the limits drawn around us by the equal rights of others. I do not add ‘within the limits of the law’; because law is often but the tyrant’s will, and always so when it violates the right of an individual.

==== Restrictions ====
In On Liberty, J. S. Mill writes that his principle does not apply to persons judged as mentally ill, "barbarians" (which he assimilated to minors) and minors while the Declaration of the Rights of Man and of the Citizen did not concern women, slaves, foreigners and minors, as they were not citizens.

Modern interpretations of the principle often does not make distinction of race or sex.

=== In modern policy ===
The harm principle is also found in recent US case law - in the case of the People v Alvarez, from the Supreme Court of California, in May, 2002:

In every criminal trial, the prosecution must prove the corpus delicti, or the body of the crime itself - i.e., the fact of injury, loss, or harm, and the existence of a criminal agency as its cause.

The harm principle even found its way into the drug laws of Colombia, in 1994, and again in 2009:

In July 2009, the Colombian Supreme Court of Justice reconfirmed the 1994 ruling of the Constitutional Court by determining that the possession of drugs for personal use 'cannot be the object of any punishments,' when the incident occurred 'in the exercise of his personal and private rights, [and] the accused did not harm others.

Even if a self-regarding action results in harm to oneself, it may still be considered beyond the sphere of justifiable state coercion.

==== Libertarianism ====
The belief "that no one should be forcibly prevented from acting in any way he chooses provided his acts are not invasive of the free acts of others" has become one of the basic principles of libertarian politics.

The US Libertarian Party includes a version of the harm principle as part of its official party platform. It states:

Criminal laws should be limited in their application to violations of the rights of others through force or fraud, or to deliberate actions that place others involuntarily at significant risk of harm. Therefore, we favor the repeal of all laws creating “crimes” without victims . . .

== Broader definitions of harm ==
In the same essay, Mill further explains the principle as a function of two maxims:

The maxims are, first, that the individual is not accountable to society for his actions, in so far as these concern the interests of no person but himself. Advice, instruction, persuasion, and avoidance by other people, if thought necessary by them for their own good, are the only measures by which society can justifiably express its dislike or disapprobation of his conduct. Secondly, that for such actions as are prejudicial to the interests of others, the individual is accountable, and may be subjected either to social or to legal punishments, if society is of opinion that the one or the other is requisite for its protection. (LV2)

The second of these maxims has become known as the social authority principle.

However, the second maxim also raises the question of broader definitions of harm, including harm to the society. Harm is not limited to harm to another individual but can extend to groups or communities, without specifying the affected individuals.

This is an important principle for the purpose of determining harm that only manifests gradually over time—such that the resulting harm can be anticipated, but does not yet exist at the time that the action causing harm was taken. It also applies to other issues—which range from the right of an entity to discharge broadly polluting waste on private property, to broad questions of licensing, and to the right of sedition.

Harm can also result from a failure to meet an obligation. Morality generates obligations. Duty may be exacted from a person in the same way as a debt, and it is part of the notion of duty that a person may be rightfully compelled to fulfill it.

== Criticism ==
Stewart Hamish has argued that the harm principle does not provide a narrow scope of which actions count as harmful towards oneself or the population and that it cannot be used to determine whether people can be punished for their actions by the state. A state can determine whether an action is punishable by determining what harm the action causes. If a morally unjust action occurs but leaves no indisputable form of harm, there is no justification for the state to act and punish the perpetrators for their actions. The harm principle has an ambiguous definition of what harm specifically is and what justifies a state to intervene.

Ben Saunders has also said that the harm principle does not specify on whether the state is justified with intervention tactics. The ambiguity can lead a state to define what counts as a harmful self-regarding action at its own discretion. That freedom might allow for an individual's own liberty and rights to be in danger. It would not be plausible for a state to intervene with an action that will negatively affect the population more than an individual. The harm principle scope of usage has been described as too wide to follow directly and to implement possible punishment by a state.

Broader definitions of harm has been used in some cases to rationalize censorship including limitation of academic freedom.

== See also ==
- Ahimsa
- Classical liberalism
- Primum non nocere - "first, to do no harm"
- Do no significant harm principle (DNSH)
- Law of equal liberty
- Legal good
- Libertarianism
- Moral absolutism
- Negative liberty
- Non-aggression principle
- Wiccan Rede

== Bibliography ==
- Feinberg, Joel (1984). The Moral Limits of the Criminal Law. London, England: Oxford University Press. ISBN 978-0199878574.
