= Legal good =

Interest protected by the legal system

In the civil law tradition, a legal good is an interest or right that the legal system protects. Legal goods are a central concern of criminal law. According to some theories, the state can only legitimately punish conduct if that conduct interferes with a legal good established in fundamental principles of law, such as a constitution. "Legal good" may also be rendered in English as legally protected good, legal interest, legally protected interest, or object of legal protection.

The concept of legal goods was developed by theorists of German criminal law in the 19th century. It has since been adopted, along with other aspects of German criminal theory, in many legal systems of Europe, Latin America, and East Asia. It is widely considered to be among the crowning accomplishments of German criminal law scholarship.

The concept of legal goods plays a particularly strong role in the German legal tradition, and German legal textbooks commonly state that the purpose of criminal law is the protection of legal goods. The concept of legal goods is not generally used in the common law tradition, where the harm principle plays a broadly analogous role.

Legal goods are classified in various ways, for example into individual legal goods that can often be waived by the individual and collective legal goods that cannot. Legal systems vary greatly in the legal goods that they protect, although certain goods such as the right of the individual to life, bodily integrity, and self-determination are widespread.

== History ==
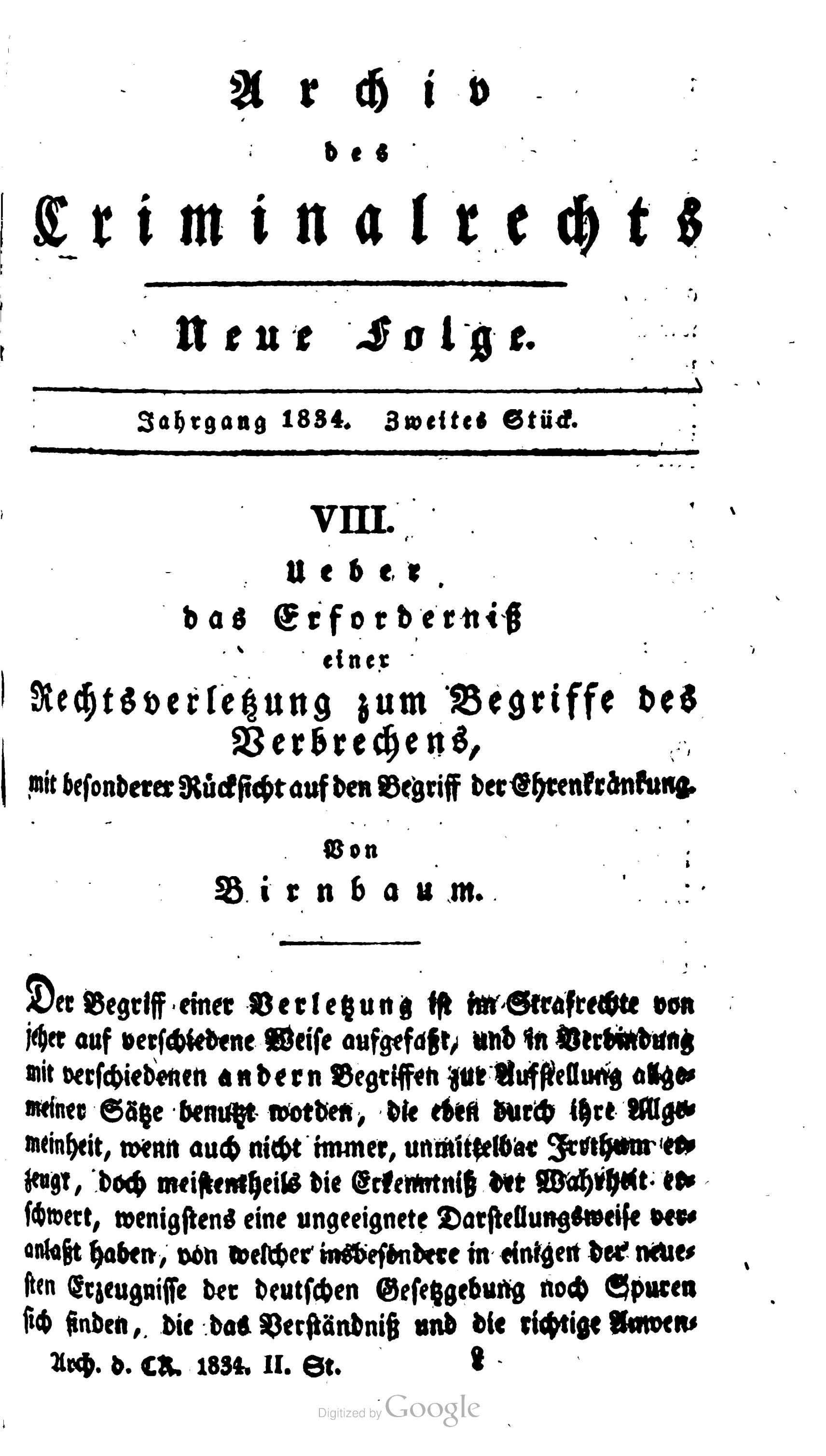
First page of Birnbaum's 1834 article on legal goods

In 1834 Johann Michael Franz Birnbaum introduced the idea that crime is not established by the violation of rights, as P.J.A. Feuerbach had proposed, but only by the violation of legally protected goods. In the later 19th century, Karl Binding and other German legal positivists involved in the drafting of the German Penal Code revived Birnbaum's concept of legal good. In contrast to Birnbaum, Binding regarded legal goods to be relevant only on a policy level, as guiding the work of the legislator. In Binding's view it was not the infringement of legal goods but the violation of a legal norm that made up the substance of crime. Under Binding's interpretation, the concept of a legal good became a rationalization for expanding the state's criminal power rather than a basis for limiting it as Birnbaum had envisioned.

The concept of legal goods attained its modern form and influence through the work of Franz von Liszt. Under Liszt's material conception of legal goods, they arise from the interest of a community in maintaining the conditions of life already in existence. A social interest does not become a legal good until it is protected by law. In contrast to Binding, Liszt argued that criminal punishment was only legitimate if it protected such existing legal goods.

During the Nazi period, legal thinkers of the Kiel School argued that the theory of legal goods did not need to be rejected, and could simply be used as a vessel to be filled with Nazi ideas. Consistent with this vision, Nazi legal doctrine emphasized such legal goods as "honor" and "Germanness".

In more recent times, legal goods theory has been criticized for its lack of a clear theoretical basis or constitutional foundation. The Federal Constitutional Court has generally not invoked the theory in its decisions, and some decisions, such as the incest decision of 2008, have been considered by scholars to be incompatible with modern legal goods theory.

== Definitions and classifications ==
A variety of definitions of legal goods have been proposed and debated. Some definitions have been based on the concept's function, others on its content. Claus Roxin defined legal goods as "conditions or chosen ends, which are useful either to the individual and his free development within the context of an overall social system based on this objective, or to the functioning of this system itself."

Although legal goods are often defined and translated as "legal interests" or "legally protected interests", this has been criticized because the interest in protecting a legal good is distinct from the good itself.

The theory of legal goods generally distinguishes between individual and collective legal goods. Individual legal goods, such as property, bodily integrity, and reputation, serve the interests of individual persons. An individual can generally dispose of individual legal goods voluntarily, although this may not apply to some individual legal goods, such as the right to life. There has been a trend over time toward greater disposability of individual legal goods.

Collective legal goods serve the interests of the general public, and cannot be disposed of by the individual. Thus, for example, German courts have upheld prohibitions on illegal drugs under the theory that these are based on a collective legal good of "public health".

Another classification has been proposed by Hans-Heinrich Jescheck and Thomas Weigend, into legal goods that are elementary, such as life, bodily integrity and property, and those that are made into legal goods through their adoption into the legal system, such as the prevention of cruelty to animals.

== Bases ==
Various schools of thought have developed around the nature and origins of legal goods. Scholars differ, for example, on whether the legislature creates individual legal goods in the first place by protecting them in a specific criminal provision (the "normative", "descriptive" or "positive" concept of legal good) or whether there are pre-existing legal goods that the legislature must protect through criminal law (the "natural" or "critical" concept of legal good). Claus Roxin has advocated that legal goods that can provide a basis for criminalization must arise from the constitution. Under the normative concept of legal good, the legal good becomes equivalent to the ratio legis and no longer limits lawmaking authority.

== Protection ==
Legal goods can be protected by both civil and criminal law. However, the protection of legal goods under criminal law may be limited by other principles, such as proportionality. According to some theories, criminal sanctions are legitimate only if the legal good cannot be protected by any other means. Since criminal law is only used as a last resort to protect a legal good, this is sometimes referred to as the subsidiarity of criminal law.

In the event of a conflict between different legal goods, a balancing of the competing goods is required. This may arise for example in cases of legitimate defense. For example, under Article 21 of the South Korean criminal code, the privilege of legitimate defense is available to the extent one is acting to defend against an infringement of a "legal good of oneself or another." Thus, for example, when a person uses force to defend against burglary, whether the defense was legitimate requires balancing the legal good of the defender (safety of home and property) against the legal good of the burglar (right to life and physical integrity).

== Compared to harm principle ==
The common law tradition has not adopted the concept of legal goods, but the harm principle, which goes back to the British philosopher John Stuart Mill, fills a similar function. Among the differences between these two approaches is that the harm principle constrains the use of criminal law to support the collective interests of society to a greater extent than legal goods theory does.
