= A System of Logic =

1843 book by John Stuart Mill

A System of Logic, Ratiocinative and Inductive
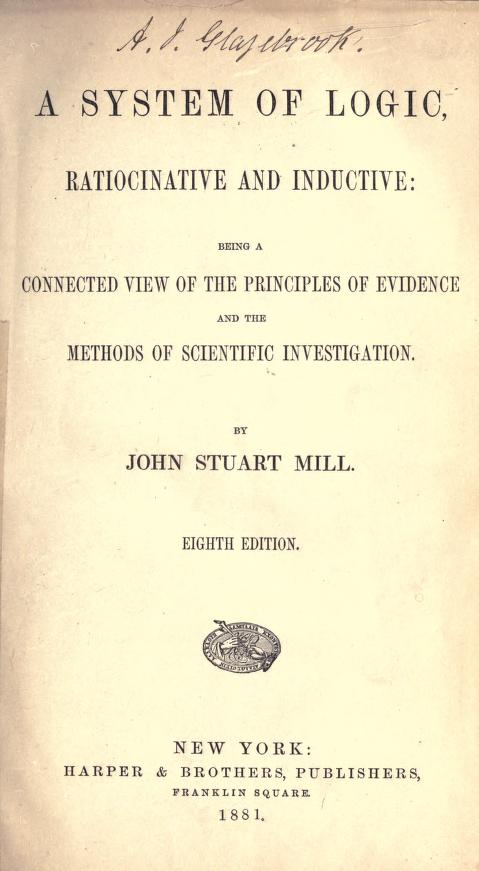
- Author: John Stuart Mill
- Language: English
- Publication date: 1843
- Publication place: United Kingdom
- Media type: Print

A System of Logic, Ratiocinative and Inductive is an 1843 book by English philosopher John Stuart Mill.

== Overview ==
In this work, he formulated the five principles of inductive reasoning that are known as Mill's methods. This work is important in the philosophy of science, and more generally, insofar as it outlines the empirical principles Mill would use to justify his moral and political philosophies.

An article in "Philosophy of Recent Times" has described this book as an "attempt to expound a psychological system of logic within empiricist principles.”

This work was important to the history of science, being a strong influence on scientists such as Dirac. A System of Logic also had an impression on Gottlob Frege, who rebuked many of Mill's ideas about the philosophy of mathematics in his work The Foundations of Arithmetic.

Mill revised the original work several times over the course of thirty years in response to critiques and commentary by Whewell, Bain, and others.

== Introduction ==
A System of Logic begins with a discussion of difficulty of a preliminary definition of what Logic is but gives one. Mill asserts his right to do this, "I do this by virtue of the right I claim for every author, to give whatever provisional definition he pleases of his own subject". He concludes with "Logic, then, is the science of the operations of the understanding which are subservient to the estimation of evidence"

== Book I ==
This Book is headed "Of Names and Propositions".

Mill begins with a "simple" quotation from Thomas Hobbes which although simple contains the essence of what leads to the greater complexities there are in naming things and ideas.

In Chapter VI of this book Mill gives a look back at the different kinds of proposition. "We then examined the different kinds of Propositions, and found that, with the exception of those which are merely verbal, they assert five different kinds of matters of fact, namely, Existence, Order in Place, Order in Time, Causation, and Resemblance; that in every proposition one of these five is either affirmed, or denied, of some fact or phenomenon, or of some object the unknown source of a fact or phenomenon."

== Book II ==
This book is headed "Of Inference, or Reasoning, in General".

Mill begins with the retrospect that we have concluded that propositions assert. We now move "to the peculiar problem of the Science of Logic, namely, how the assertions, of which we have analysed the import, are proved or disproved."

In Chapter I of this book Mill emphasies the practicality of the type of Logic He values and hopes this book will promote. "There is no more important intellectual habit, nor any the cultivation of which falls more strictly within the province of the art of logic, than that of discerning rapidly and surely the identity of an assertion when disguised under diversity of language."

== Book III ==
This book is headed "Of Induction"

The centrality of Induction to Mill's System of Logic is emphasized by such statements as, "What Induction is, therefore, and what conditions render it legitimate, cannot but be deemed the main question of the science of logic, the question which includes all others."

== Book IV ==
This book is headed "Of Operations Subsidiary to Induction"

Mill writes that this book is needed because,

"The consideration of Induction, however, does not end with the direct rules for its performance. Something must be said of those other operations of the mind, which are either necessarily presupposed in all induction, or are instrumental to the more difficult and complicated inductive processes".

== Book V ==
This book is headed "On Fallacies"

The five classes of fallacies being, Fallacies of Simple inspection, or a priori fallacies, Fallacies of Observation, Fallacies of Generalization, Fallacies of Ratiocination, Fallacies of Confusion.

== Book VI ==
This book is headed "On the Logic of the Moral Sciences".

Mill considered Book VI particularly significant, as it addressed the application of scientific methods to the moral and social sciences.

"The backward state of the Moral Sciences can only be remedied by applying to them the methods of Physical Science, duly extended and generalized".

== Editions ==
Eight editions of Mill's work were published in his lifetime, from 1843-1872. Every edition contains changes and revisions, though in varying degrees. He also introduced hundreds of changes in the proof stage between the first manuscript version and the first printed edition. In total, including these proof changes, Mills made 4,822 alterations to his work.

Since the original publications are now public domain, digital facsimile scans and reprints of these are widely available, for example from Google Books and Project Gutenberg. Links to these can be found below.

The most academically robust edition is the critical edition which occupies volumes seven and eight of The Collected Works of John Stuart Mill. ISBN 0-8020-1875-0

- A System of Logic Ratiocinative and Inductive, in The Collected Works of John Stuart Mill, ed. J.M. Robson, University of Toronto Press & Routledge, 1974.
  - Vol. 7: Books I-III. ISBN 0-7100-7503-0
  - Vol. 8: Books IV-VI and Appendices. ISBN 0-7100-7506-5
  - Paperback reprints of these editions are also published by The Liberty Fund. They have also made digital scans and HTML versions of these available online for free.
    - Vol. 7: ISBN 978-0-86597-655-9, 0-86597-655-4
    - Vol. 8: ISBN 978-0-86597-656-6, 0-86597-656-2
    - 2-vol. set: ISBN 978-0-86597-692-4, 0-86597-692-9

Philosopher Jonathan Bennett also produced an annotated, modernized, and somewhat abridged edition, available for free on his website.

== See also ==
- Emergentism

== Sources ==
- Philosophy of Recent Times, ed. J. B. Hartmann (New York: McGraw-Hill, 1967), I, 14.
