= Book of office =

A book of office may refer either to a record of the conduct of affairs within an organization, particularly a religious organization like a church, or to a body of writing establishing the guiding philosophy of an organization like a political party.

== Practical Books of Office ==
Religious organizations, including individual churches and parishes, may record the acts of their leaders in a book of office. This practice has also been used to record the dealings of secular organizations like courts. The infrequency of reference to these books in modern use may point to a decline in their use.

== Philosophical Books of Office ==
A political party may refer to a work as a "book of office" if it represents the philosophical foundation of the party. John Stuart Mill's On Liberty is described as the book of office for the Liberal Democrats of the United Kingdom (and its predecessor the Liberal Party), and is presented to every newly elected President of the party upon election.

== See also ==
- Biblical canon - any work considered as authoritative scripture by a particular religious community
- Potlatch - a science fiction convention which designates an annual "book of honor" instead of a "guest of honor"
