= On Liberty =

Book by John Stuart Mill

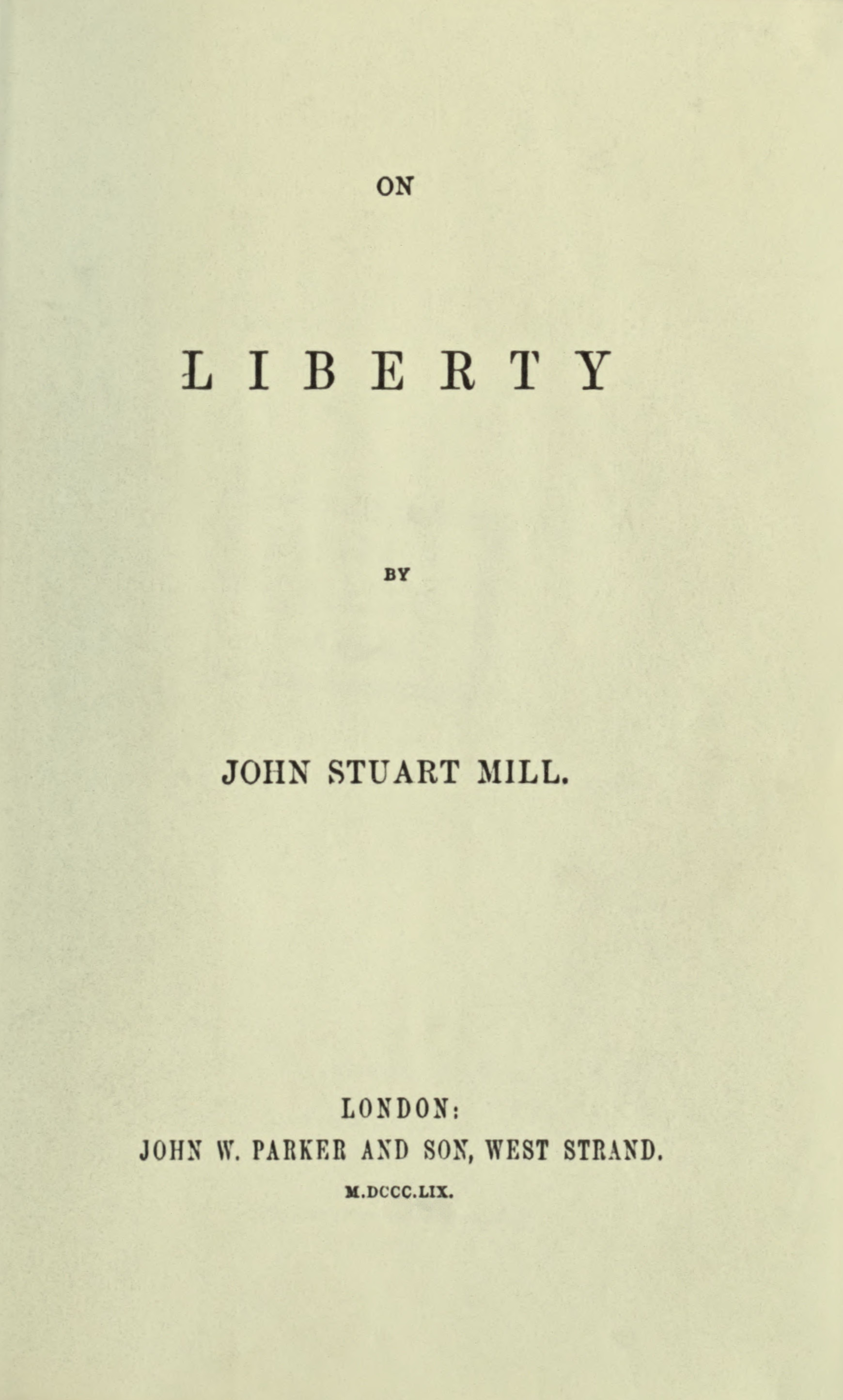
- The title page of the first edition, published 1859
- Author: John Stuart Mill
- Language: English
- Subject: Liberty
- Publication date: 1859
- Publication place: United Kingdom
- Media type: Print
- Dewey Decimal: 323.44
- LC Class: JC585
- Text: On Liberty at Wikisource

On Liberty is an essay written by the English philosophers Harriet Taylor Mill and John Stuart Mill and published in 1859 under the latter's name. (Note: Their co-authorship was established in 2022 and the first edition listing both their names was published in 2026.) It applied their ethical system of utilitarianism to society and state. The Mills suggested standards for the relationship between authority and liberty. They emphasized the importance of individuality, which they considered a prerequisite to the higher pleasures—the summum bonum of utilitarianism. Furthermore, the Mills asserted that democratic ideals may result in the tyranny of the majority. Among the standards proposed are the Mills' three basic liberties of individuals, their three legitimate objections to government intervention, and their two maxims regarding the relationship of the individual to society.

On Liberty was a greatly influential and well-received work. Some classical liberals and libertarians have criticized it for its apparent discontinuity with Utilitarianism, and vagueness in defining the arena within which individuals can contest government infringements on their personal freedom of action. The ideas presented in On Liberty have remained the basis of much political thought. It has remained in print since its initial publication.

== Composition ==
According to John Stuart Mill's autobiography, On Liberty was first conceived as a short essay in 1854. As the ideas developed, the essay was expanded, rewritten and "sedulously" corrected jointly by the married couple. After suffering a mental breakdown and eventually meeting and subsequently marrying Harriet, Mill had changed many of his beliefs on moral life and women's rights. Mill states that On Liberty "was more directly and literally our joint production than anything else which bears my name."

The final draft was nearly complete when Harriet died suddenly in 1858. Mill suggests that he made no alterations to the text at this point and that one of his first acts after her death was to publish it, under his name alone, and to "consecrate it to her memory." The book and its ideas have historically been attributed to J.S. Mill alone, and political philosophers, economists and critics have historically used the singular "Mill" as a metonym for the work. The composition of On Liberty was also indebted to the writings of the German thinker Wilhelm von Humboldt, especially his essay On the Limits of State Action. Finally published in 1859, On Liberty was one of Mill's two most influential books (the other being Utilitarianism).

In 2022 stylometric analysis suggested that Harriet Taylor Mill's contributions are sufficiently substantial for her to be regarded as co-author. In 2026, the first edition adding Harriet Taylor Mill's name alongside John Stuart Mill's was published by Hackett.

== Overview ==
=== Introduction ===
The Mills open their essay by discussing the historical "struggle between authority and liberty," describing the tyranny of government, which, in their view, needs to be controlled by the liberty of the citizens. They divide this control of authority into two mechanisms: necessary rights belonging to citizens, and the "establishment of constitutional checks by which the consent of the community, or of a body of some sort, supposed to represent its interests, was made a necessary condition to some of the more important acts of the governing power." Because society was—in its early stages—subjected to such turbulent conditions (i.e. small population and constant war), it was forced to accept rule "by a master." However, as mankind progressed, it became conceivable for the people to rule themselves. The Mills admit that this new form of society seemed immune to tyranny because "there was no fear of tyrannizing over self." Despite the high hopes of the Enlightenment, the Mills argue that the democratic ideals were not as easily met as expected. First, even in a democracy, the rulers were not always the same sort of people as the ruled. Second, there is a risk of a "tyranny of the majority" in which the many oppress the few who, according to democratic ideals, have just as much a right to pursue their legitimate ends.

In the Mills' view, tyranny of the majority is worse than tyranny of government because it is not limited to a political function. Where one can be protected from a tyrant, it is much harder to be protected "against the tyranny of the prevailing opinion and feeling." The prevailing opinions within society will be the basis of all rules of conduct within society; thus there can be no safeguard in law against the tyranny of the majority. The Mills' proof goes as follows: the majority opinion may not be the correct opinion. The only justification for a person's preference for a particular moral belief is that it is that person's preference. On a specific issue, people will align themselves either for or against that issue; the side of greatest volume will prevail, but is not necessarily correct. In conclusion to this analysis of past governments, Mill proposes a single standard for which a person's liberty may be restricted:

That the only purpose for which power can be rightfully exercised over any member of a civilized community, against his will, is to prevent harm to others. His own good, either physical or moral, is not a sufficient warrant.... Over himself, over his body and mind, the individual is sovereign.

The Mills clarify that this standard is solely based on utility, not on natural rights. According to the Mills, children and "barbarian" nations benefit from limited freedom. Just despots, such as Charlemagne and Akbar the Great, were historically beneficial to people not yet fit to rule themselves.

They conclude the Introduction by discussing what they claimed were the three basic liberties in order of importance:

1. The freedom of thought and emotion. This includes the freedom to act on such thought, i.e. freedom of speech
2. The freedom to pursue tastes (provided they do no harm to others), even if they are deemed "immoral"
3. The freedom to unite so long as the involved members are of age, the involved members are not forced, and no harm is done to others

While the Mills admit that these freedoms could—in certain situations—be pushed aside, they claim that in contemporary and civilised societies there is no justification for their removal.

=== Of the liberty of thought and discussion ===
In the second chapter, Mill attempts to prove the claim from the first chapter that opinions ought never to be suppressed. Looking to the consequences of suppressing opinions, he concludes that opinions ought never to be suppressed, stating, "Such prejudice, or oversight, when it [i.e. false belief] occurs, is altogether an evil; but it is one from which we cannot hope to be always exempt, and must be regarded as the price paid for an inestimable good." He claims that there are three sorts of beliefs that can be had—wholly false, partly true, and wholly true—all of which, according to Mill, benefit the common good:

First, if any opinion is compelled to silence, that opinion may, for aught we can certainly know, be true. To deny this is to assume our own infallibility. Secondly, though the silenced opinion be an error, it may, and very commonly does, contain a portion of truth; and since the general or prevailing opinion on any subject is rarely or never the whole truth, it is only by the collision of adverse opinions that the remainder of the truth has any chance of being supplied. Thirdly, even if the received opinion be not only true, but the whole truth; unless it is suffered to be, and actually is, vigorously and earnestly contested, it will, by most of those who receive it, be held in the manner of a prejudice, with little comprehension or feeling of its rational grounds. And not only this, but, fourthly, the meaning of the doctrine itself will be in danger of being lost, or enfeebled, and deprived of its vital effect on the character and conduct: the dogma becoming a mere formal profession, inefficacious for good, but cumbering the ground, and preventing the growth of any real and heartfelt conviction, from reason or personal experience.

Mill spends much of the chapter discussing the implications of and objections to the policy of never suppressing opinions. In doing so, he explains his opinion of Christian ethics, arguing that, while such ethics are praiseworthy, they are incomplete on their own. Therefore, Mill concludes that suppression of opinion based on belief in infallible doctrine is dangerous. Among the other objections he answers is the objection that the truth will necessarily survive persecution and that society need only teach the grounds for truth, not the objections to it. Near the end of Chapter 2, Mill states that "unmeasured vituperation, enforced on the side of prevailing opinion, deters people from expressing contrary opinion, and from listening to those who express them."

=== On individuality as one of the elements of well-being ===
In the third chapter, the Mills point out the inherent value of individuality since individuality is ex vi termini (i.e. by definition) the thriving of the human person through the higher pleasures. They argue that a society ought to attempt to promote individuality as it is a prerequisite for creativity and diversity. With this in mind, the Mills believe that conformity is dangerous. They state that they fear that Western civilization approaches this well-intentioned conformity to praiseworthy maxims characterized by the Chinese civilization. Therefore, they conclude that actions in themselves do not matter. Rather, the person behind the action and the action together are valuable. He writes:

It really is of importance, not only what men do, but also what manner of men they are that do it. Among the works of man, which human life is rightly employed in perfecting and beautifying, the first in importance surely is man himself. Supposing it were possible to get houses built, corn grown, battles fought, causes tried, and even churches erected and prayers said, by machinery—by automatons in human form—it would be a considerable loss to exchange for these automatons even the men and women who at present inhabit the more civilised parts of the world, and who assuredly are but starved specimens of what nature can and will produce. Human nature is not a machine to be built after a model, and set to do exactly the work prescribed for it, but a tree, which requires to grow and develop itself on all sides, according to the tendency of the inward forces which make it a living thing.

=== On the limits to the authority of society over the individual ===
In the fourth chapter, the Mills explain a system in which a person can discern what aspects of life should be governed by the individual and which by society. Generally, they hold that a person should be left as free to pursue their own interests as long as this does not harm the interests of others. In such a situation, "society has jurisdiction over [the person's conduct]." They reject the idea that this liberty is simply for the purpose of allowing selfish indifference. Rather, they argue that this liberal system will bring people to the good more effectively than physical or emotional coercion. This principle leads them to conclude that a person may, without fear of just punishment, harm himself through vice. Governments, they claim, should only punish a person for neglecting to fulfill a duty to others (or causing harm to others), not the vice that brought about the neglect.

The Mills spend the rest of the chapter responding to objections to their maxim. They note the objection that they contradicts themselves in granting societal interference with youth because they are irrational, but denying societal interference with certain adults, though they act irrationally. The Mills first respond by restating the claim that society ought to punish the harmful consequences of the irrational conduct, but not the irrational conduct itself, which is a personal matter. Furthermore, they note the societal obligation is not to ensure that each individual is moral throughout adulthood. Rather, they state that, by educating youth, society has the opportunity and duty to ensure that a generation, as a whole, is generally moral.

Where some may object that there is justification for certain religious prohibitions in a society dominated by that religion, the Mills argue that majority members ought to make rules that they would accept should they have been the minority. They state that "unless we are willing to adopt the logic of persecutors, and say that we may persecute others because we are right, and that they must not persecute us because they are wrong, we must beware of admitting a principle of which we should resent as a gross injustice the application to ourselves." In saying this, they reference an earlier claim that morals and religion cannot be treated in the same light as mathematics because morals and religion are vastly more complex. Just as with living in a society with immoral people, the Mills point out that agents who find another's conduct depraved do not have to socialise with the other, merely refrain from impeding their personal decisions. While the Mills generally opposes the religiously motivated societal interference, they admits that it is conceivably permissible for religiously motivated laws to prohibit the use of what no religion obligates. For example, a Muslim state could feasibly prohibit pork. However, they still prefer a policy of society minding its own business.

=== Applications ===
This last chapter applies the principles laid out in the previous sections. The authors begin by summarising these principles:

The maxims are, first, that the individual is not accountable to society for his actions, in so far as these concern the interests of no person but himself. Advice, instruction, persuasion, and avoidance by other people if thought necessary by them for their own good, are the only measures by which society can justifiably express its dislike or disapprobation of his conduct. Secondly, that for such actions as are prejudicial to the interests of others, the individual is accountable, and may be subjected either to social or to legal punishment, if society is of the opinion that the one or the other is requisite for its protection.

==== Economy ====
The Mills first apply these principles to the economy. They conclude that free markets are preferable to those controlled by governments. While it may seem, because "trade is a social act," that the government ought to intervene in the economy, the Mills argues that economies function best when left to their own devices. Therefore, government intervention, though theoretically permissible, would be counterproductive. Later, they attack government-run economies as "despotic." They believe that if the government ran the economy, then all people would aspire to be part of a bureaucracy that had no incentive to further the interests of any but itself.

==== Preventing harm ====
Next the Mills investigate the ways in which a person may try to prevent harm. They first admit that a person should not wait for injury to happen, but ought try to prevent it. Second, they state that agents must consider whether that which can cause injury can cause injury exclusively. They give the example of selling poison. Poison can cause harm. However, they point out that poison can also be used for good. Therefore, selling poison is permissible. Yet, due to the risk entailed in selling poison or like products (e.g. alcohol), they see no danger to liberty to require warning labels on the product. Again, the Mills apply their principle. They consider the right course of action when an agent sees a person about to cross a condemned bridge without being aware of the risk. The Mills state that because the agent presumably has interest in not crossing a dangerous bridge (i.e. if they knew the facts concerned with crossing the bridge, they would not desire to cross the bridge), it is permissible to forcibly stop the person from crossing the bridge. They qualify the assertion stating that, if the means are available, it is better to warn the unaware person.

With regard to taxing to deter agents from buying dangerous products, they make a distinction. They state that to tax solely to deter purchases is impermissible because prohibiting personal actions is impermissible and "[e]very increase of cost is a prohibition, to those whose means do not come up to the augmented price." However, because a government must tax to some extent in order to survive, it may choose to take its taxes from what it deems most dangerous.

==== Repeat offences to public through private action ====
The Mills expand upon this principle of punishing the consequences rather than the personal action. They argue that a person who is empirically prone to act violently (i.e. harm society) from drunkenness (i.e. a personal act) should be uniquely restricted from the drinking. They further stipulate that repeat offenders should be punished more than first time offenders.

==== Encouraging vice ====
On the subject of fornication and gambling, the Mills have no conclusive answer, stating, "[t]here are arguments on both sides." They suggest that while the actions might be "tolerated" in private, promoting the actions (i.e. being a pimp or keeping a gambling house) "should not be permitted." They reach a similar conclusion with acts of indecency, concluding that public indecency is condemnable.

==== Suicide and divorce ====
The Mills continue by addressing the question of social interference in suicide. They state that the purpose of liberty is to allow a person to pursue their interest. Therefore, when a person intends to terminate their ability to have interests it is permissible for society to step in. In other words, a person does not have the freedom to surrender their freedom. To the question of divorce, the Mills argue that marriages are one of the most important structures within society; however, if a couple mutually agrees to terminate their marriage, they are permitted to do so because society has no grounds to intervene in such a deeply personal contract.

==== Education ====
The Mill believed that government-run education is an evil because it would destroy diversity of opinion for all people to be taught the curriculum developed by a few. The less evil version of state run schooling, according to the Mills, is that which competes against other privately run schools. In contrast, the Mills believe that governments ought to require and fund private education. They state that government should enforce mandatory education through minor fines and annual standardised testing that tested only uncontroversial fact. They go on to emphasise the importance of a diverse education that teaches opposing views (e.g. Kant and Locke). They conclude by stating that it is legitimate for states to forbid marriages unless the couple can prove that they have "means of supporting a family" through education and other basic necessities.

==== Conclusion ====
The Mills conclude by stating three general reasons to object to governmental interference:

1. if agents do the action better than the government.
2. if it benefits agents to do the action though the government may be more qualified to do so.
3. if the action would add so greatly to the government power that it would become over-reaching or individual ambition would be turned into dependency on government.

They summarise their thesis, stating:

The worth of a State, in the long run, is the worth of the individuals composing it; and a State which postpones the interests of their mental expansion and elevation, to a little more of administrative skill, or of that semblance of it which practice gives, in the details of business; a State which dwarfs its men, in order that they may be more docile instruments in its hands even for beneficial purposes—will find that with small men no great thing can really be accomplished; and that the perfection of machinery to which it has sacrificed everything, will in the end avail it nothing, for want of the vital power which, in order that the machine might work more smoothly, it has preferred to banish.

== Reception ==
On Liberty was enormously popular in the years following its publication. Thomas Hardy recalled later in life that undergraduates in the 1860s knew the book almost by heart. Criticisms of the book in the 19th century came chiefly from thinkers who felt that the Mill's concept of liberty left the door open for barbarism, such as Thomas Carlyle, James Fitzjames Stephen and Matthew Arnold.

In more recent times, although On Liberty garnered adverse criticism, it has been largely received as an important classic of political thought for its ideas and accessibly lucid style. Denise Evans and Mary L. Onorato summarise the modern reception of On Liberty, stating: "[c]ritics regard his essay On Liberty as a seminal work in the development of British liberalism. Enhanced by his powerful, lucid, and accessible prose style, Mill's [sic] writings on government, economics, and logic suggest a model for society that remains compelling and relevant." As one sign of the book's importance, a copy of On Liberty is the symbol of office for the president of the Liberal Democrat Party in England.

The historian Peter Marshall described On Liberty as "one of the great classics of libertarian thought", due to its exaltation of individual freedoms.

=== Contradiction to utilitarianism ===
The Mills makes it clear throughout On Liberty that they "regard utility as the ultimate appeal on all ethical questions", a standard they inherited from Mill's father, a follower of Jeremy Bentham. Though the Mills claimed that all of their principles on liberty appeal to the ultimate authority of utilitarianism, according to Nigel Warburton, much of the essay can seem divorced from their supposed final court of appeals. The Mills seem to idealize liberty and rights at the cost of utility. For instance, the Mills writes:

If all mankind minus one, were of one opinion, and only one person were of contrary opinion, mankind would be no more justified in silencing that one person, than he, if he had the power, would be justified in silencing mankind.

This claim seems to go against the principle of utilitarianism, that it is permissible that one should be harmed so that the majority could benefit.

Warburton argues that the Mills are too optimistic about the outcome of free speech. Warburton suggests that there are situations in which it would cause more happiness to suppress truth than to permit it. For example, if a scientist discovered a comet about to kill the planet in a matter of weeks, it may cause more happiness to suppress the truth than to allow society to discover the impending danger.

While David Brink concedes that the Mills' apparently categorical appeal to rights seems to contradict utilitarianism, he points out that they does not believe rights are truly categorical because they oppose unrestrained liberty (e.g. offensive public exposure).

Furthermore, David Brink tries to reconcile the Mills' system of rights with utilitarianism in three ways:

1. Rights are secondary principles to the Greatest Happiness Principle
2. Rights are incomparable goods, justifying their categorical enforcement
3. Liberty is a good. Thus, those who suppress it are worthy of punishment. Rights deal with the value of punishing/protecting others' interference with liberty, not the actual protection of liberty

=== Narrow focus ===
Some thinkers have criticised the Mills' writing for its apparent narrow or unclear focus in several areas. The Mills makes clear that they only consider adults in their writing, failing to account for how irrational members of society, such as children, ought to be treated. Yet their theory relies upon the proper upbringing of children. Plank has asserted that the Mills fails to account for physical harm, solely concerning himself with spiritual wellbeing. He also argues that, while much of their theory depends upon a distinction between private and public harm, they seems not to have provided a clear focus on or distinction between the private and public realms.

=== Religious criticism ===
Nigel Warburton states that though the Mills encouraged religious tolerance, because they did not speak from the perspective of a specific religion, some claim that they did not account for what certain religious beliefs would entail when governing a society. Some religions believe that they have a God given duty to enforce religious norms. For them, it seems impossible for their religious beliefs to be wrong, i.e. the beliefs are infallible. Therefore, according to Warburton, the Mills' principle of total freedom of speech may not apply.

=== Conception of harm ===
The harm principle is central to the principles in On Liberty. Nigel Warburton says that the Mills appear unclear about what constitutes harm. Early in the book, they claim that simply being offensive does not constitute harm. Later, they write that certain acts which are permissible and harmless in private are worthy of being prohibited in public. This seems to contradict their earlier claim that merely offensive acts do not warrant prohibition because, presumably, the only harm done by a public act which is harmless in private is that it is offensive.

Warburton notes that some people argue that morality is the basis of society, and that society is the basis of individual happiness. Therefore, if morality is undermined, so is individual happiness. Hence, since the Mills claim that governments ought to protect the individual's ability to seek happiness, governments ought to intervene in the private realm to enforce moral codes.

== Legacy ==
A copy of On Liberty is passed to the president of the British Liberal Democrats as a symbol of office.
