= John Stuart Mill =

English politician and philosopher (1806–1873)

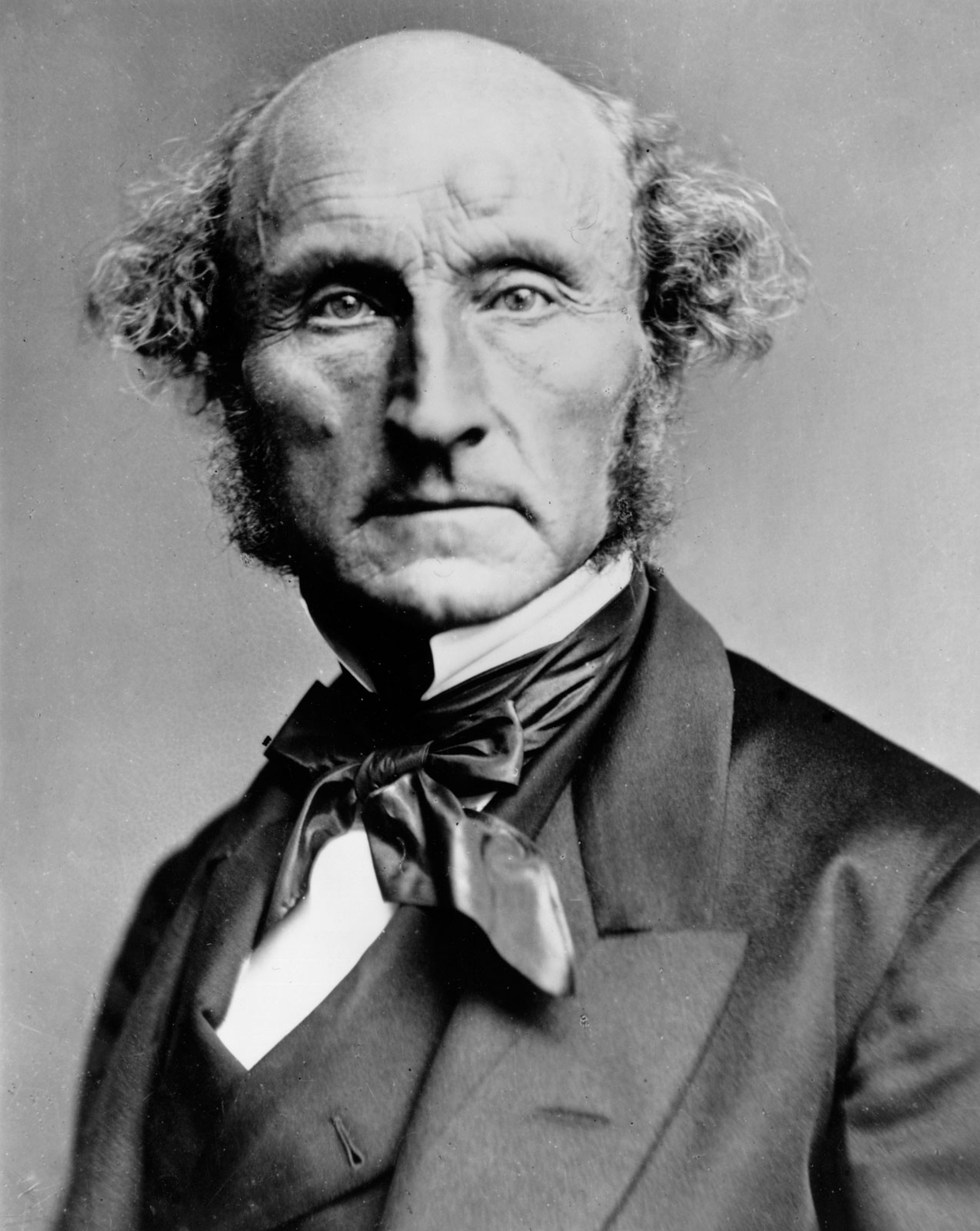
- Mill in c. 1870

Member of Parliament for City of Westminster
- In office 25 July 1865 – 17 November 1868 Serving with Robert Grosvenor
- Preceded by: De Lacy Evans
- Succeeded by: William Henry Smith

Personal details
- Born: 20 May 1806 Pentonville, Middlesex, England
- Died: 7 May 1873 (aged 66) Avignon, Vaucluse, France
- Party: Liberal
- Spouse: Harriet Taylor (m. 1851; died 1858)
- Parents: James Mill (father); Harriet Barrow (mother)
- Education: University College London

Philosophical work
- Era: 19th-century philosophy; Classical economics
- Region: Western philosophy
- School: Consequentialism; Empiricism; Liberalism; Psychologism; Social liberalism (Contested); Classical liberalism (Contested); Utilitarianism

Academic background
- Influences: Appleton; Bentham; Carlyle; Comte; Fourier; James Mill; Owen; Priestley; Ricardo; Saint-Simon; Smith; Taylor; Taylor Mill
- Main interests: Economics; ethics; logic; politics
- Notable ideas: Direct reference theory; early liberal feminism; emergentism; harm principle; social liberty; liberty as freedom to act vs. liberty as the absence of coercion; Mill's methods; Millian theory of proper names; public/private sphere; rule utilitarianism

John Stuart Mill (20 May 1806 – 7 May 1873) was an English philosopher, political economist, and politician. He was a paradigmatic philosopher of liberalism and has been described as "the most influential English-speaking philosopher of the nineteenth century" by the Stanford Encyclopedia of Philosophy. He conceived of liberty as justifying the freedom of the individual in opposition to unlimited state and social control, and formulated the Harm principle. He also advocated proportional representation, the emancipation of women, and the development of labour organisations and farm cooperatives, and has been classified as both a classical liberal and social liberal. Mill's philosophy has also been described as early market socialism.

The Columbia Encyclopedia describes Mill as occasionally coming "close to socialism, a theory repugnant to his predecessors". He was a proponent of the utilitarianism of his predecessor Jeremy Bentham, and contributed to the investigation of scientific methodology.

A member of the Liberal Party and co-author of the early feminist work The Subjection of Women (1869), Mill was also the second Member of Parliament to call for women's suffrage after Henry Hunt in 1832. The contentions of his essay On Liberty (1859) remain highly influential: and a copy of the work is passed to the president of the Liberal Democrats (the successor party to Mill's own) as a symbol of office.

== Biography ==
=== Early life and education ===
John Stuart Mill was born at 13 Rodney Street in Pentonville, then on the edge of the capital and now in central London, the eldest son of Harriet Barrow and the Scottish philosopher, historian, and economist James Mill. John Stuart was educated by his father, with the advice and assistance of Jeremy Bentham for whom he had worked as a ghostwriter and Francis Place. He was given an extremely rigorous upbringing and was deliberately shielded from association with children his own age other than his siblings. His father, a follower of Bentham and an adherent of associationism, had as his explicit aim to create a genius intellect that would carry on the cause of utilitarianism and its implementation after he and Bentham had died.

Mill was a notably precocious child. He describes his education in his autobiography. At the age of three he was taught Greek. By the age of eight, he had read Aesop's Fables, Xenophon's Anabasis, and the whole of Herodotus, and was acquainted with Lucian, Diogenes Laërtius, Isocrates and six dialogues of Plato. He had also read a great deal of history in English and had been taught arithmetic, physics and astronomy.

At the age of eight, Mill began studying Latin, the works of Euclid, and algebra, and was appointed schoolmaster to the younger children of the family. His main reading was still history, but he went through all the commonly taught Latin and Greek authors, and by the age of ten could read Plato and Demosthenes with ease. His father also thought that it was important for Mill to study and compose poetry. One of his earliest poetic compositions was a continuation of the Iliad. In his spare time, he also enjoyed reading about natural sciences and popular novels, such as Don Quixote and Robinson Crusoe.

His father's work, The History of British India, was published in 1818; immediately thereafter, at about the age of twelve, Mill began a thorough study of the scholastic logic, at the same time reading Aristotle's logical treatises in the original language. In the following year, he was introduced to political economy and studied Adam Smith and David Ricardo with his father, ultimately completing their classical economic view of factors of production. Mill's comptes rendus of his daily economy lessons helped his father in writing Elements of Political Economy in 1821, a textbook to promote the ideas of Ricardian economics; however, the book lacked popular support. Ricardo, who was a close friend of his father, used to invite the young Mill to his house for a walk to talk about political economy.

At the age of fourteen, Mill stayed a year in France with the family of Sir Samuel Bentham, brother of Jeremy Bentham and in the company of George Ensor, then pursuing his polemic against the political economy of Thomas Malthus. The mountain scenery he saw led to a lifelong taste for mountain landscapes. The lively and friendly way of life of the French also left a deep impression on him. In Montpellier, he attended the winter courses on chemistry, zoology, logic of the Faculté des Sciences, as well as taking a course in higher mathematics. While coming and going from France, he stayed in Paris for a few days in the house of the renowned economist Jean-Baptiste Say, a friend of Mill's father. There he met many leaders of the Liberal party, as well as other notable Parisians, including Henri Saint-Simon.

Mill went through months of sadness and contemplated suicide at twenty years of age. According to the opening paragraphs of Chapter V of his autobiography, he had asked himself whether the creation of a just society, his life's objective, would actually make him happy. His heart answered "no", and unsurprisingly, he lost the happiness of striving towards this objective. Eventually, the poetry of William Wordsworth showed him that beauty generates compassion for others and stimulates joy. With renewed vigour, he continued to work towards a just society, but with more relish for the journey. He considered this one of the most pivotal shifts in his thinking. In fact, many of the differences between him and his father stemmed from this expanded source of joy.

Mill met Thomas Carlyle during one of the latter's visits to London in the early 1830s, and the two quickly became companions and correspondents. Mill offered to print Carlyle's works at his own expense and encouraged Carlyle to write his French Revolution, supplying him with materials to do so. In March 1835, while the manuscript of the completed first volume was in Mill's possession, Mill's housemaid unwittingly used it as tinder, destroying all "except some three or four bits of leaves". Mortified, Mill offered Carlyle £200 (£17,742.16 in 2021) as compensation (Carlyle would only accept £100). Ideological differences would put an end to the friendship during the 1840s, though Carlyle's early influence on Mill would colour his later thought.

Mill had been engaged in a pen-friendship with Auguste Comte, the founder of positivism and sociology, since Mill first contacted Comte in November 1841. Comte's sociologie was more an early philosophy of science than modern sociology is. Comte's positivism motivated Mill to eventually reject Bentham's psychological egoism and what he regarded as Bentham's cold, abstract view of human nature, focused on legislation and politics, instead coming to favour Comte's more sociable view of human nature focused on historical facts and directed more towards human individuals in all their complexities.

As a nonconformist who refused to subscribe to the Thirty-Nine Articles of the Church of England, Mill was not eligible to study at the University of Oxford or the University of Cambridge. Instead he followed his father to work for the East India Company, and attended University College, London, to hear the lectures of John Austin, the first Professor of Jurisprudence. He was elected a foreign honorary member of the American Academy of Arts and Sciences in 1856.

=== Career ===
Mill's career as a colonial administrator at the East India Company spanned from when he was 17 years old in 1823 until 1858, when the company's territories in India were directly annexed by the Crown, establishing direct Crown control over India. In 1836, he was promoted to the company's political department, where he was responsible for correspondence pertaining to the company's relations with the princely states, and, in 1856, was finally promoted to the position of Examiner of Indian Correspondence. In On Liberty, A Few Words on Non-Intervention, and other works, he opined that "To characterize any conduct whatever towards a barbarous people as a violation of the law of nations, only shows that he who so speaks has never considered the subject." (However, Mill immediately added that "A violation of the great principles of morality it may easily be.") Mill viewed places such as India as having once been progressive in their outlook, but had now become stagnant in their development; he opined that this meant these regions had to be ruled via a form of "benevolent despotism...provided the end is improvement." When the Crown proposed to take direct control over the territories of the East India Company, Mill was tasked with defending Company rule and penned Memorandum on the Improvements in the Administration of India during the Last Thirty Years, among other petitions. He was offered a seat on the Council of India, the body created to advise the new Secretary of State for India, but declined, citing disapproval of the new system of administration in India.

==== Professorship ====
Between the years 1865 and 1868 Mill served as Lord Rector of the University of St Andrews. At his inaugural address, delivered to the university on 1 February 1867, he made the now-famous (but often wrongly attributed) remark that "Bad men need nothing more to compass their ends, than that good men should look on and do nothing." That Mill included that sentence in the address is a matter of historical record, but it by no means follows that it expressed a wholly original insight.

==== Member of Parliament (1865–1868) ====
During the same period, 1865–68, he was also a Member of Parliament (MP) for City of Westminster. He was sitting for the Liberal Party. During his time as an MP, Mill advocated easing the burdens on Ireland. In 1866, he became the second person in the history of Parliament, after Henry Hunt, to call for women to be given the right to vote, vigorously defending this position in subsequent debate. He also became a strong advocate of such social reforms as labour unions and farm cooperatives. In Considerations on Representative Government, he called for various reforms of Parliament and voting, especially proportional representation, the single transferable vote, and the extension of suffrage. In April 1868, he favoured in a Commons debate the retention of capital punishment for such crimes as aggravated murder; he termed its abolition "an effeminacy in the general mind of the country". (It is said in 1868, when his first term ended, no party would nominate him due to his independent spirit.)

He was elected to membership of the American Philosophical Society in 1867.

=== Death ===
Mill died on 7 May 1873, at the age of 66, of erysipelas in Avignon, where his body was buried alongside his wife's. He bequeathed his estate to his step-daughter, Helen Taylor, and designated her his literary executor.

== Philosophy ==
=== Achieving happiness ===
Mill believed that for the majority of people (those with but a moderate degree of sensibility and of capacity for enjoyment) happiness is best achieved en passant, rather than striving for it directly. This meant no self-consciousness, scrutiny, self-interrogation, dwelling on, thinking about, imagining or questioning on one's happiness. Then, if otherwise fortunately circumstanced, one would "inhale happiness with the air you breathe."

=== A System of Logic ===
Mill joined the debate over the scientific method, which followed on from John Herschel's 1830 publication of A Preliminary Discourse on the Study of Natural Philosophy, which incorporated inductive reasoning from the known to the unknown, discovering general laws in specific facts and verifying these laws empirically. William Whewell expanded on this in his 1837 History of the Inductive Sciences, from the Earliest to the Present Time, followed in 1840 by The Philosophy of the Inductive Sciences, Founded Upon their History, presenting induction as the mind superimposing concepts on facts. Laws were self-evident truths, which could be known without need for empirical verification.

Mill countered this in 1843 in A System of Logic (fully titled A System of Logic, Ratiocinative and Inductive, Being a Connected View of the Principles of Evidence, and the Methods of Scientific Investigation). In "Mill's Methods" (of induction), as in Herschel's, laws were discovered through observation and induction, and required empirical verification. Matilal remarks that Dignāga analysis is much like John Stuart Mill's Joint Method of Agreement and Difference, which is inductive. He suggested that it was very likely that during his stay in India he came across the tradition of logic, in which scholars started taking interest after 1824, though it is unknown whether it influenced his work.

=== Colonialism ===
Like his father James, Mill was a supporter of British colonialism. He was a member of Edward Gibbon Wakefield's Colonization Society, and in his own work, Principles of Political Economy (1848), he praised Wakefield for his "important writings on colonization". Later on in his essay On Liberty (1859) he stated that the principles of liberty espoused therein did not apply to "those backward states of society in which the race itself may be considered as in its nonage". Mill praised the colonies of ancient Greece for "flourishing so rapidly and so wonderfully", seeing them as a model to be emulated.

Mill, an employee of the East India Company from 1823 to 1858, argued in support of what he called a "benevolent despotism" with regard to the administration of overseas colonies. Mill argued:

To suppose that the same international customs, and the same rules of international morality, can obtain between one civilized nation and another, and between civilized nations and barbarians, is a grave error. ... To characterize any conduct whatever towards a barbarous people as a violation of the law of nations, only shows that he who so speaks has never considered the subject.

For John Mill's Father, James Mill, India was "a burden" for England and British colonialism "a blessing of unspeakable magnitude to the population" of India. He also stated his support for settler colonialism. Mill expressed general support for Company rule in India, but expressed reservations on specific Company policies in India which he disagreed with.

He also supported colonialism in other places, such as Australia. Mill was among the founding members of the South Australian Association in 1833, which was set up to lobby the government to establish colonies in Australia.

Mill saw federal systems of politics as a solution to contemporary political crises and as an ideal for the future organization of humanity.

=== Economic philosophy ===
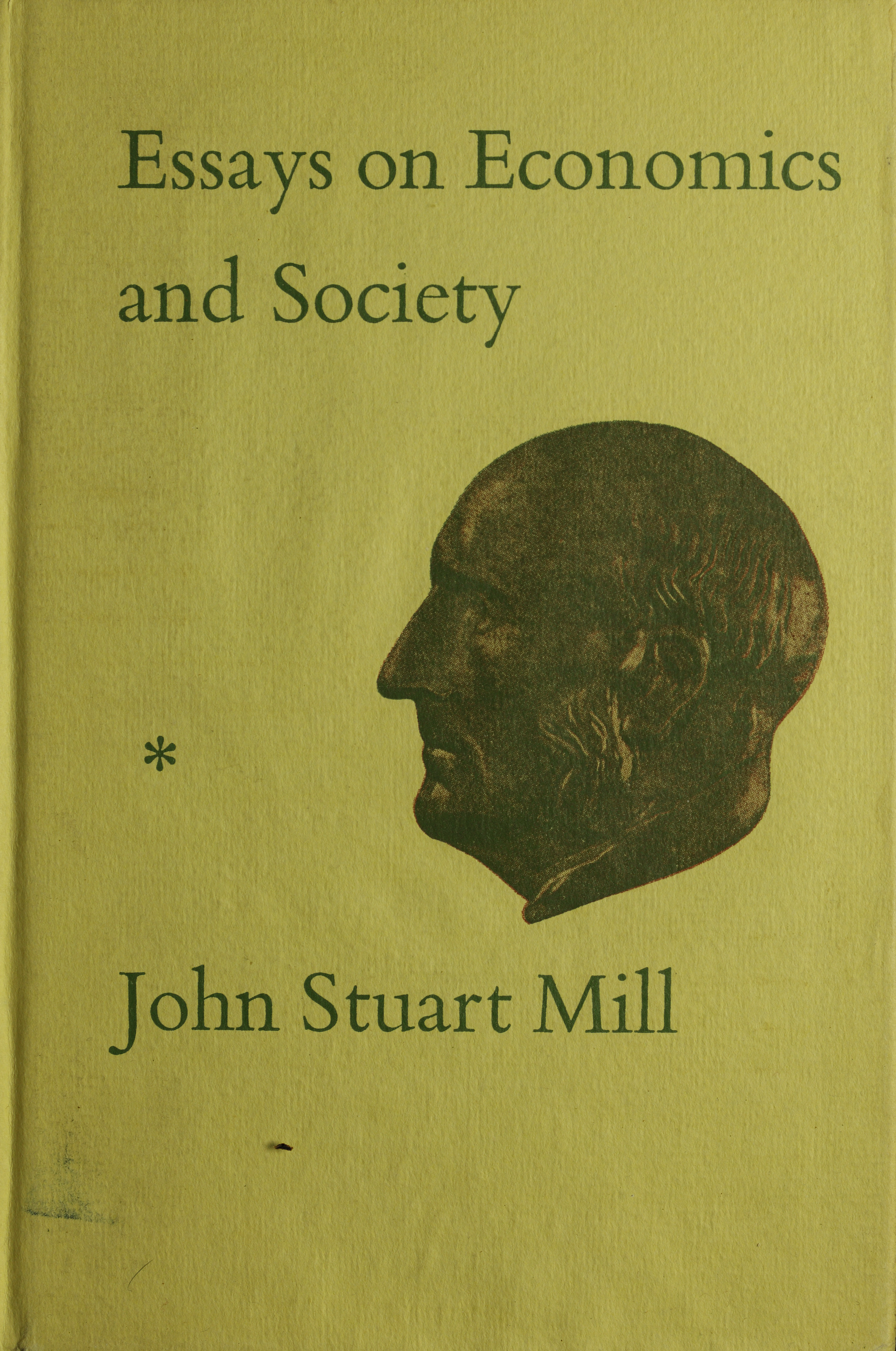
Essays on Economics and Society, 1967

Mill's early economic philosophy was one of free markets. However, he accepted interventions in the economy, such as a tax on alcohol, if there were sufficient utilitarian grounds. He also accepted the principle of legislative intervention for the purpose of animal welfare. He originally believed that "equality of taxation" meant "equality of sacrifice" and that progressive taxation penalized those who worked harder and saved more and was therefore "a mild form of robbery".

Given an equal tax rate regardless of income, Mill agreed that inheritance should be taxed. A utilitarian society would agree that everyone should be equal one way or another. Therefore, receiving inheritance would put one ahead of society unless taxed on the inheritance. Those who donate should consider and choose carefully where their money goes—some charities are more deserving than others. Considering public charities boards such as a government will disburse the money equally. However, a private charity board like a church would disburse the monies fairly to those who are in more need than others.

Later he altered his views toward a more socialist bent, adding chapters to his Principles of Political Economy in defence of a socialist outlook, and defending some socialist causes. Within this revised work he also made the radical proposal that the whole wage system be abolished in favour of a co-operative wage system. Nonetheless, some of his views on the idea of flat taxation remained, albeit altered in the third edition of the Principles of Political Economy to reflect a concern for differentiating restrictions on "unearned" incomes, which he favoured, and those on "earned" incomes, which he did not favour.

In his autobiography, Mill stated that in relation to his later views on political economy, his "ideal of ultimate improvement... would class [him] decidedly under the general designation of Socialists." His views shifted partly due to reading the works of utopian socialists, but also from the influence of Harriet Taylor. In his 1879 work Socialism, Mill argued that the prevalence of poverty in contemporary industrial capitalist societies was "pro tanto a failure of the social arrangements", and that attempts to condone this state of affairs as being the result of individual failings did not represent a justification of them but instead were "an irresistible claim upon every human being for protection against suffering".

Mill's Principles, first published in 1848, was one of the most widely read of all books on economics in the period. As Adam Smith's Wealth of Nations had during an earlier period, Principles came to dominate economics teaching. In the case of Oxford University it was the standard text until 1919, when it was replaced by Marshall's Principles of Economics.

==== Criticism ====
Karl Marx, in his critique of political economy, mentioned Mill in the Grundrisse. Marx contended that Mill's thinking posited the categories of capital in an ahistorical fashion.

Thomas Babington Macaulay argued that, like the Scholastic philosophers whose methods the scientific revolution superseded and discredited, Mill relied too often upon deduction from propositions whose truth was deemed axiomatic, rather than upon observed facts gleaned from practical experience.

==== Economic democracy and market socialism ====
Mill's main objection to socialism focused on what he saw as its destruction of competition. He wrote, "[W]hile I agree and sympathize with socialists in this practical portion of their aims, I utterly dissent from the most conspicuous and vehement part of their teaching—their declamations against competition." Though he was an egalitarian, Mill argued more for equal opportunity and placed meritocracy above all other ideals in this regard. He further argued that a socialist society would only be attainable through the provision of basic education for all, promoting economic democracy instead of capitalism, in the manner of substituting capitalist businesses with worker cooperatives. He wrote:

The form of association, however, which if mankind continue to improve, must be expected in the end to predominate, is not that which can exist between a capitalist as chief, and work-people without a voice in the management, but the association of the labourers themselves on terms of equality, collectively owning the capital with which they carry on their operations, and working under managers elected and removable by themselves.

In his later thought, he advocated for a cooperative economic order, an economy based on enterprises run by workers themselves in an open market, rather than the employment-wage relationship of capitalist companies, and Mill's ideas led him to be classified as an early proponent of market socialism theory.

==== Political democracy ====
Mill's major work on political democracy, Considerations on Representative Government, defends two fundamental principles: extensive participation by citizens and enlightened competence of rulers. The two values are obviously in tension, and some readers have concluded that he is an elitist democrat, while others count him as an earlier participatory democrat. In one section, he appears to defend a type of plural voting where more competent citizens are given extra votes (a view he later repudiated). However, in another chapter he argues cogently for the value of participation by all citizens. He believed that the incompetence of the masses could eventually be overcome if they were given a chance to take part in politics, especially at the local level.

Mill is one of the few political philosophers ever to serve in government as an elected official. In his three years in Parliament, he was more willing to compromise than the "radical" principles expressed in his writing would lead one to expect.

Mill was a major proponent of the diffusion and use of public education to the working class. He saw the value of the individual person, and believed that "man had the inherent capability of guiding his own destiny-but only if his faculties were developed and fulfilled", which could be achieved through education. He regarded education as a pathway to improve human nature which to him meant "to encourage, among other characteristics, diversity and originality, the energy of character, initiative, autonomy, intellectual cultivation, aesthetic sensibility, non-self-regarding interests, prudence, responsibility, and self-control." Education allowed for humans to develop into full informed citizens that had the tools to improve their condition and make fully informed electoral decisions. The power of education lay in its ability to serve as a great equalizer among the classes allowing the working class the ability to control their own destiny and compete with the upper classes. Mill recognised the paramount importance of public education in avoiding the tyranny of the majority by ensuring that all the voters and political participants were fully developed individuals. It was through education, he believed, that an individual could become a full participant within representative democracy.

In regards to higher education, Mill defended liberal education against contemporary arguments for models of higher education focused on religion or science. His 1867 St. Andrews Address called on elites educated in reformed universities to work towards education policy committed to liberal principles.

==== Theories of wealth and income distribution ====
In Principles of Political Economy, Mill offered an analysis of two economic phenomena often linked together: the laws of production and wealth and the modes of their distribution. Regarding the former, he believed that it was not possible to alter the laws of production, "the ultimate properties of matter and mind... only to employ these properties to bring about events we are interested in." The modes of distribution of wealth is a matter of human institutions solely, starting with what Mill believed to be the primary and fundamental institution: Individual Property. He believed that all individuals must start on equal terms, with division of the instruments of production fairly among all members of society. Once each member has an equal amount of individual property, they must be left to their own exertion not to be interfered with by the state. Regarding inequality of wealth, Mill believed that it was the role of the government to establish both social and economic policies that promote the equality of opportunity.

The government, according to Mill, should implement three tax policies to help alleviate poverty:

1. fairly assessed income tax;
2. an inheritance tax; and
3. a policy to restrict sumptuary consumption.

Inheritance of capital and wealth plays a large role in the development of inequality, because it provides greater opportunity for those receiving the inheritance. Mill's solution to inequality of wealth brought about by inheritance was to implement a greater tax on inheritances, because he believed the most important authoritative function of the government is taxation, and taxation judiciously implemented could promote equality.

==== The environment ====
In Book IV, chapter VI of Principles of Political Economy: "Of the Stationary State", Mill recognised wealth beyond the material and argued that the logical conclusion of unlimited growth was destruction of the environment and a reduced quality of life. He concluded that a stationary state could be preferable to unending economic growth:

I cannot, therefore, regard the stationary states of capital and wealth with the unaffected aversion so generally manifested towards it by political economists of the old school.

If the earth must lose that great portion of its pleasantness which it owes to things that the unlimited increase of wealth and population would extirpate from it, for the mere purpose of enabling it to support a larger, but not a better or a happier population, I sincerely hope, for the sake of posterity, that they will be content to be stationary, long before necessity compel them to it.

==== Rate of profit ====
According to Mill, the ultimate tendency in an economy is for the rate of profit to decline due to diminishing returns in agriculture and increase in population at a Malthusian rate.

=== Slavery and racial equality ===
In 1850, Mill sent an anonymous letter in rebuttal to Thomas Carlyle's letter to Fraser's Magazine for Town and Country (which came to be known under the title "The Negro Question"), in which Carlyle argued for slavery. Mill supported abolishing slavery in the United States, expressing his opposition to slavery in his essay of 1869, The Subjection of Women:

This absolutely extreme case of the law of force, condemned by those who can tolerate almost every other form of arbitrary power, and which, of all others, presents features the most revolting to the feeling of all who look at it from an impartial position, was the law of civilized and Christian England within the memory of persons now living: and in one half of Anglo-Saxon America three or four years ago, not only did slavery exist, but the slave trade, and the breeding of slaves expressly for it, was a general practice between slave states. Yet not only was there a greater strength of sentiment against it, but, in England at least, a less amount either of feeling or of interest in favour of it, than of any other of the customary abuses of force: for its motive was the love of gain, unmixed and undisguised: and those who profited by it were a very small numerical fraction of the country, while the natural feeling of all who were not personally interested in it, was unmitigated abhorrence.

Mill corresponded with John Appleton, an American legal reformer from Maine, extensively on the topic of racial equality. Appleton influenced Mill's work on such, especially swaying him on the optimal economic and social welfare plan for the Antebellum South. In a letter sent to Appleton in response to a previous letter, Mill expressed his view on antebellum integration:

I cannot look forward with satisfaction to any settlement but complete emancipation—land given to every negro family either separately or in organized communities under such rules as may be found temporarily necessary—the schoolmaster set to work in every village & the tide of free immigration turned on in those fertile regions from which slavery has hitherto excluded it. If this be done, the gentle & docile character which seems to distinguish the negroes will prevent any mischief on their side, while the proofs they are giving of fighting powers will do more in a year than all other things in a century to make the whites respect them & consent to their being politically & socially equals.

Unlike many of his peers, Mill supported the Union in the American Civil War, seeing it as a necessary evil that would deliver a vital "salutary shock" to the national conscience and help preserve liberal ideals while eradicating the "stain" of slavery in the United States. Mill expressed his views in an article for Fraser's Magazine, arguing against the defenders of the Confederate States of America.

There are people who tell us that, on the side of the North, the question is not one of slavery at all. The North, it seems, have no more objection to slavery than the South have. [...] If this be the true state of the case, what are the Southern chiefs fighting about? Their apologists in England say that it is about tariffs, and similar trumpery. They say nothing of the kind. They tell the world, and they told their own citizens when they wanted their votes, that the object of the fight was slavery. [...] The world knows what the question between the North and South has been for many years, and still is. Slavery alone was thought of, alone talked of. Slavery was battled for and against, on the floor of Congress and in the plains of Kansas; on the slavery question exclusively was the party constituted which now rules the United States: on slavery Fremont was rejected, on slavery Lincoln was elected; the South separated on slavery, and proclaimed slavery as the one cause of separation.

=== Theory of liberty ===
Mill's On Liberty (1859) addresses the nature and limits of the power that can be legitimately exercised by society over the individual. Mill's idea is that only if a democratic society follows the Principle of Liberty can its political and social institutions fulfill their role of shaping national character so that its citizens can realise the permanent interests of people as progressive beings. (Rawls, Lectures on the History of Political Philosophy, p. 289)

Mill states the Principle of Liberty as: "the sole end for which mankind are warranted, individually or collectively, in interfering with the liberty of action of any of their number, is self-protection." "The only purpose for which power can be rightfully exercised over any member of a civilised community, against his will, is to prevent harm to others. His own good, either physical or moral, is not a sufficient warrant."

One way to read Mill's Principle of Liberty as a principle of public reason is to see it as excluding certain kinds of reasons from being taken into account in legislation, or in guiding the moral coercion of public opinion. (Rawls, Lectures on the History of Political Philosophy, p. 291) These reasons include those founded in other persons' good; reasons of excellence and ideals of human perfection; reasons of dislike or disgust, or of preference.

Mill states that "harms" which may be prevented include acts of omission as well as acts of commission. Thus, failing to rescue a drowning child counts as a harmful act, as does failing to pay taxes, or failing to appear as a witness in court. All such harmful omissions may be regulated, according to Mill. By contrast, it does not count as harming someone if—without force or fraud—the affected individual consents to assume the risk: thus one may permissibly offer unsafe employment to others, provided there is no deception involved. He does, however, recognise one limit to consent: society should not permit people to sell themselves into slavery.

The question of what counts as a self-regarding action and what actions, whether of omission or commission, constitute harmful actions subject to regulation, continues to exercise interpreters of Mill. He did not consider giving offence to constitute "harm"; an action could not be restricted because it violated the conventions or morals of a given society.

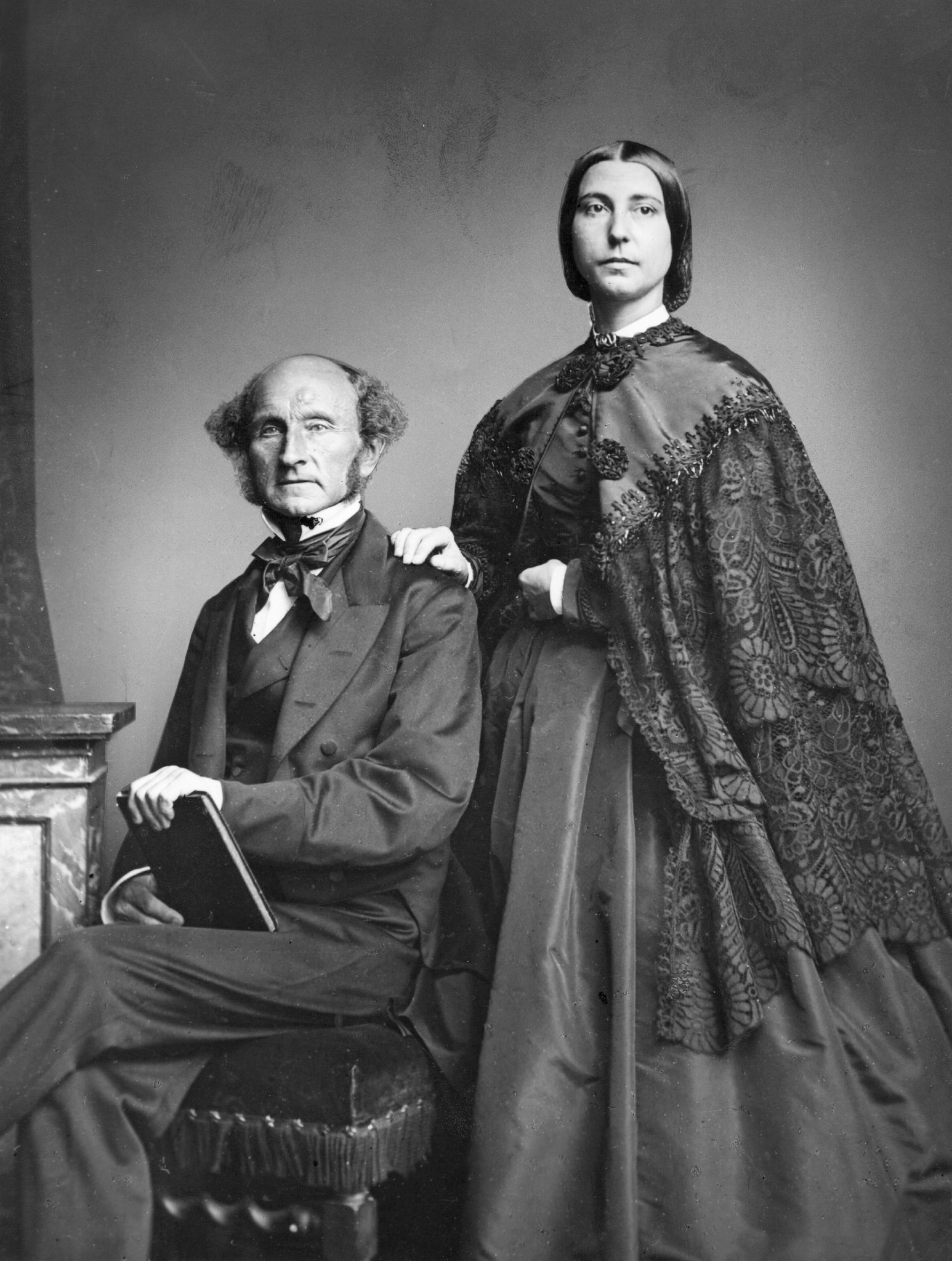
John Stuart Mill and Helen Taylor. Helen was the daughter of Harriet Taylor and collaborated with Mill for fifteen years after her mother's death in 1858.

==== Social liberty and tyranny of majority ====
Mill believed that "the struggle between Liberty and Authority is the most conspicuous feature in the portions of history." For him, liberty in antiquity was a "contest...between subjects, or some classes of subjects, and the government."

Mill defined social liberty (also civil liberty) as protection from "the tyranny of political rulers". He introduced a number of different concepts of the form tyranny can take, referred to as social tyranny, and tyranny of the majority. Social liberty for Mill meant putting limits on the ruler's power so that he would not be able to use that power to further his own wishes and thus make decisions that could harm society. In other words, people should have the right to have a say in the government's decisions. He said that social liberty was "the nature and limits of the power which can be legitimately exercised by society over the individual." It was attempted in two ways: first, by obtaining recognition of certain immunities (called political liberties or rights); and second, by establishment of a system of "constitutional checks".

However, in Mill's view, limiting the power of government was not enough:

Society can and does execute its own mandates: and if it issues wrong mandates instead of right, or any mandates at all in things with which it ought not to meddle, it practises a social tyranny more formidable than many kinds of political oppression, since, though not usually upheld by such extreme penalties, it leaves fewer means of escape, penetrating much more deeply into the details of life, and enslaving the soul itself.

==== Liberty ====
Mill's view on liberty, which was influenced by Joseph Priestley and Josiah Warren, is that individuals ought to be free to do as they wished unless they caused harm to others. Individuals are rational enough to make decisions about their well-being. Government should interfere when it is for the protection of society. Mill explained:

The sole end for which mankind are warranted, individually or collectively, in interfering with the liberty of action of any of their number, is self-protection. That the only purpose for which power can be rightfully exercised over any member of a civilized community, against his will, is to prevent harm to others. His own good, either physical or moral, is not sufficient warrant. He cannot rightfully be compelled to do or forbear because it will be better for him to do so, because it will make him happier, because, in the opinion of others, to do so would be wise, or even right. ... The only part of the conduct of anyone, for which he is amenable to society, is that which concerns others. In the part which merely concerns him, his independence is, of right, absolute. Over himself, over his own body and mind, the individual is sovereign.

==== Freedom of speech ====
On Liberty involves an impassioned defence of free speech. Mill argues that free discourse is a necessary condition for intellectual and social progress. We can never be sure, he contends, that a silenced opinion does not contain some element of the truth. He also argues that allowing people to air false opinions is productive for two reasons. First, individuals are more likely to abandon erroneous beliefs if they are engaged in an open exchange of ideas. Second, by forcing other individuals to re-examine and re-affirm their beliefs in the process of debate, these beliefs are kept from declining into mere dogma. It is not enough for Mill that one simply has an unexamined belief that happens to be true; one must understand why the belief in question is the true one. Along those same lines Mill wrote, "unmeasured vituperation, employed on the side of prevailing opinion, really does deter people from expressing contrary opinions, and from listening to those who express them."

As an influential advocate of freedom of speech, Mill objected to censorship:

I choose, by preference the cases which are least favourable to me—in which the argument opposing freedom of opinion, both on truth and that of utility, is considered the strongest. Let the opinions impugned be the belief in God and in a future state, or any of the commonly received doctrines of morality. ... But I must be permitted to observe, that it is not the feeling sure of a doctrine (be it what it may) which I call an assumption of infallibility. It is the undertaking to decide that question for others, without allowing them to hear what can be said on the contrary side. And I denounce and reprobate this pretension not the less, if put forth on the side of my most solemn convictions. However positive any one's persuasion may be, not only of the falsity, but of the pernicious consequences–not only of the pernicious consequences, but (to adopt expressions which I altogether condemn) the immorality and impiety of an opinion; yet if, in pursuance of that private judgment, though backed by the public judgment of his country or his contemporaries, he prevents the opinion from being heard in its defence, he assumes infallibility. And so far from the assumption being less objectionable or less dangerous because the opinion is called immoral or impious, this is the case of all others in which it is most fatal.

Mill outlines the benefits of "searching for and discovering the truth" as a way to further knowledge. He argued that even if an opinion is false, the truth can be better understood by refuting the error. And as most opinions are neither completely true nor completely false, he points out that allowing free expression allows the airing of competing views as a way to preserve partial truth in various opinions. Worried about minority views being suppressed, he argued in support of freedom of speech on political grounds, stating that it is a critical component for a representative government to have to empower debate over public policy. He also eloquently argued that freedom of expression allows for personal growth and self-realization. He said that freedom of speech was a vital way to develop talents and realise a person's potential and creativity. He repeatedly said that eccentricity was preferable to uniformity and stagnation.

==== Harm principle ====
The belief that freedom of speech would advance society presupposed a society sufficiently culturally and institutionally advanced to be capable of progressive improvement. If any argument is really wrong or harmful, the public will judge it as wrong or harmful, and then those arguments cannot be sustained and will be excluded. Mill argued that even any arguments which are used in justifying murder or rebellion against the government should not be politically suppressed or socially persecuted. According to him, if rebellion is really necessary, people should rebel; if murder is truly proper, it should be allowed. However, the way to express those arguments should be a public speech or writing, not in a way that causes actual harm to others. Such is the harm principle: "That the only purpose for which power can be rightfully exercised over any member of a civilized community, against his will, is to prevent harm to others."

At the beginning of the 20th century, Associate justice Oliver Wendell Holmes Jr. made the standard of "clear and present danger" based on Mill's idea. In the majority opinion, Holmes writes:

The question in every case is whether the words used are used in such circumstances and are of such a nature as to create a clear and present danger that they will bring about the substantive evils that Congress has a right to prevent.

Holmes suggested that falsely shouting out "Fire!" in a dark theatre, which evokes panic and provokes injury, would be such a case of speech that creates an illegal danger. But if the situation allows people to reason by themselves and decide to accept it or not, any argument or theology should not be blocked.

Here is Mill on the same topic: "No one pretends that actions should be as free as opinions. On the contrary, even opinions lose their immunity, when the circumstances in which they are expressed are such as to constitute their expression a positive instigation to some mischievous act. An opinion that corn-dealers are starvers of the poor, or that private property is robbery, ought to be unmolested when simply circulated through the press, but may justly incur punishment when delivered orally to an excited mob assembled before the house of a corn-dealer, or when handed about among the same mob in the form of a placard" (On Liberty, chapter 3).

Mill's argument is now generally accepted by many democratic countries, and they have laws at least guided by the harm principle. For example, in American law some exceptions limit free speech such as obscenity, defamation, breach of peace, and "fighting words".

==== Freedom of the press ====
In On Liberty, Mill thought it was necessary for him to restate the case for press freedom. He considered that argument already won. Almost no politician or commentator in mid-19th-century Britain wanted a return to Tudor and Stuart-type press censorship. However, Mill warned new forms of censorship could emerge in the future. Indeed, in 2013 the Cameron Tory government considered setting up an independent official regulator of the UK press. This prompted demands for better basic legal protection of press freedom.

=== Utilitarianism ===
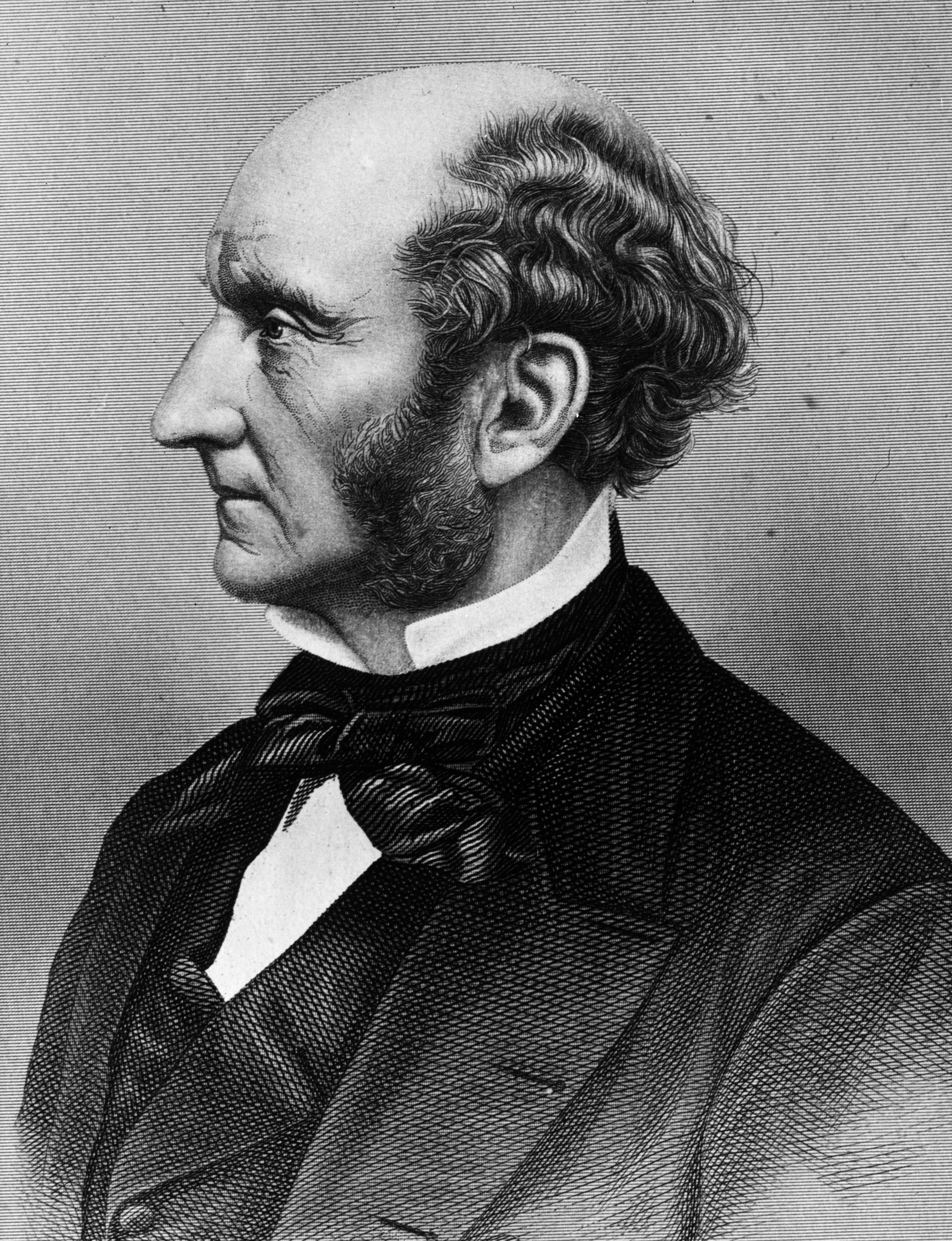
"The utilitarian doctrine is, that happiness is desirable, and the only thing desirable, as an end; all other things being only desirable as means to that end." ~ John Stuart Mill, Utilitarianism (1863)

The canonical statement of Mill's utilitarianism can be found in his book, Utilitarianism. Although this philosophy has a long tradition, Mill's account is primarily influenced by Jeremy Bentham and Mill's father James Mill.

John Stuart Mill believed in the philosophy of utilitarianism, which he would describe as the principle that holds "that actions are right in the proportion as they tend to promote happiness, wrong as they tend to produce the reverse of happiness." By happiness he means, "intended pleasure, and the absence of pain; by unhappiness, pain, and the privation of pleasure". It is clear that we do not all value virtues as a path to happiness and that we sometimes only value them for selfish reasons. However, Mill asserts that upon reflection, even when we value virtues for selfish reasons we are in fact cherishing them as a part of our happiness.

Bentham's famous formulation of utilitarianism is known as the greatest-happiness principle. It holds that one must always act so as to produce the greatest aggregate happiness among all sentient beings, within reason. In a similar vein, Mill's method of determining the best utility is that a moral agent, when given the choice between two or more actions, ought to choose the action that contributes most to (maximizes) the total happiness in the world. Happiness, in this context, is understood as the production of pleasure or privation of pain. Given that determining the action that produces the most utility is not always so clear-cut, Mill suggests that the utilitarian moral agent, when attempting to rank the utility of different actions, should refer to the general experience of persons. That is, if people generally experience more happiness following action X than they do action Y, the utilitarian should conclude that action X produces more utility than action Y, and so is to be preferred.

Utilitarianism is a consequentialist ethical theory, meaning that it holds that acts are justified insofar as they produce a desirable outcome. The overarching goal of utilitarianism—the ideal consequence—is to achieve the "greatest good for the greatest number as the result of human action". In Utilitarianism, Mill states that "happiness is the sole end of human action." This statement aroused some controversy, which is why Mill took it a step further, explaining how the very nature of humans wanting happiness, and who "take it to be reasonable under free consideration", demands that happiness is indeed desirable. In other words, free will leads everyone to make actions inclined on their own happiness, unless reasoned that it would improve the happiness of others, in which case, the greatest utility is still being achieved. To that extent, the utilitarianism that Mill is describing is a default lifestyle that he believes is what people who have not studied a specific opposing field of ethics would naturally and unconsciously use when faced with a decision.

Utilitarianism is thought of by some of its activists to be a more developed and overarching ethical theory of Immanuel Kant's belief in goodwill, and not just some default cognitive process of humans. Where Kant (1724–1804) would argue that reason can only be used properly by goodwill, Mill would say that the only way to universally create fair laws and systems would be to step back to the consequences, whereby Kant's ethical theories become based around the ultimate good—utility. By this logic the only valid way to discern what is the proper reason would be to view the consequences of any action and weigh the good and the bad, even if on the surface, the ethical reasoning seems to indicate a different train of thought.

==== Higher and lower pleasures ====
Mill's major contribution to utilitarianism is his argument for the qualitative separation of pleasures. Bentham treats all forms of happiness as equal, whereas Mill argues that intellectual and moral pleasures (higher pleasures) are superior to more physical forms of pleasure (lower pleasures). He distinguishes between happiness and contentment, claiming that the former is of higher value than the latter, a belief wittily encapsulated in the statement that, "it is better to be a human being dissatisfied than a pig satisfied; better to be Socrates dissatisfied than a fool satisfied. And if the fool, or the pig, are of a different opinion, it is because they only know their own side of the question."

This made Mill believe that "our only ultimate end" is happiness. One unique part of his utilitarian view, that is not seen in others, is the idea of higher and lower pleasures. Mill explains the different pleasures as:

If I am asked, what I mean by difference of quality in pleasures, or what makes one pleasure more valuable than another, merely as a pleasure, except its being greater in amount, there is but one possible answer. Of two pleasures, if there be one to which all or almost all who have experience of both give a decided preference [...] that is the more desirable pleasure.

He defines higher pleasures as mental, moral, and aesthetic pleasures, and lower pleasures as being more sensational. He believed that higher pleasures should be seen as preferable to lower pleasures since they have a greater quality in virtue. He holds that pleasures gained in activity are of a higher quality than those gained passively.

Mill defines the difference between higher and lower forms of pleasure with the principle that those who have experienced both tend to prefer one over the other. This is, perhaps, in direct contrast with Bentham's statement that "Quantity of pleasure being equal, push-pin is as good as poetry", that, if a simple child's game like hopscotch causes more pleasure to more people than a night at the opera house, it is more incumbent upon a society to devote more resources to propagating hopscotch than running opera houses. Mill's argument is that the "simple pleasures" tend to be preferred by people who have no experience with high art, and are therefore not in a proper position to judge. He also argues that people who, for example, are noble or practise philosophy, benefit society more than those who engage in individualist practices for pleasure, which are lower forms of happiness. It is not the agent's own greatest happiness that matters "but the greatest amount of happiness altogether".

==== Chapters ====
Mill separated his explanation of Utilitarianism into five different sections:

1. "General Remarks";
2. "What Utilitarianism Is";
3. "Of the Ultimate Sanction of the Principle of Utility";
4. "Of What Sort of Proof the Principle of Utility is Susceptible"; and
5. "Of the Connection between Justice and Utility".

In the "General Remarks" portion of his essay, he speaks about how next to no progress has been made when it comes to judging what is right and what is wrong in morality and if there is such a thing as moral instinct (which he argues that there may not be). However, he agrees that in general, "Our moral faculty, according to all those of its interpreters who are entitled to the name of thinkers, supplies us only with the general principles of moral judgments."

In "What Utilitarianism Is", he focuses no longer on background information but on utilitarianism itself. He quotes utilitarianism as "the greatest happiness principle", defining this theory by saying that pleasure and no pain are the only inherently good things in the world and expands on it by saying that "actions are right in proportion as they tend to promote happiness, wrong as they tend to produce the reverse of happiness. By happiness is intended pleasure, and the absence of pain; by unhappiness, pain, and the privation of pleasure." He views it not as an animalistic concept because he sees seeking out pleasure as a way of using our higher facilities. He also says in this chapter that the happiness principle is based not exclusively on the individual but mainly on the community.

Mill also defends the idea of a "strong utilitarian conscience (i.e., a strong feeling of obligation to the general happiness)". He argued that humans have a desire to be happy and that that desire causes us to want to be in unity with other humans. This causes us to care about the happiness of others, as well as the happiness of complete strangers. But this desire also causes us to experience pain when we perceive harm to other people. He believes in internal sanctions that make us experience guilt and appropriate our actions. These internal sanctions make us want to do good because we do not want to feel guilty for our actions. Happiness is our ultimate end because it is our duty. He argues that we do not need to be constantly motivated by the concern of people's happiness because most of the actions done by people are done out of good intention, and the good of the world is made up of the good of the people.

In Mill's fourth chapter, "Of What Sort of Proof the Principle of Utility is Susceptible", he speaks of what proofs of Utility are affected. He starts this chapter off by saying that all of his claims cannot be backed up by reasoning. He claims that the only proof that something brings one pleasure is if someone finds it pleasurable. Next, he talks about how morality is the basic way to achieve happiness. He also discusses in this chapter that utilitarianism is beneficial for virtue. He says that "it maintains not only that virtue is to be desired, but that it is to be desired disinterestedly, for itself." In his final chapter he looks at the connection between utilitarianism and justice. He contemplates the question of whether justice is something distinct from utility or not. He reasons this question in several different ways and finally comes to the conclusion that in certain cases justice is essential for utility, but in others, social duty is far more important than justice. Mill believes that "justice must give way to some other moral principle, but that what is just in ordinary cases is, by reason of that other principle, not just in the particular case."

The qualitative account of happiness that Mill advocates thus sheds light on his account presented in On Liberty. As he suggests in that text, utility is to be conceived in relation to humanity "as a progressive being", which includes the development and exercise of rational capacities as we strive to achieve a "higher mode of existence". The rejection of censorship and paternalism is intended to provide the necessary social conditions for the achievement of knowledge and the greatest ability for the greatest number to develop and exercise their deliberative and rational capacities.

Mill redefines the definition of happiness as "the ultimate end, for the sake of which all other things are desirable (whether we are considering our own good or that of other people) is an existence as free as possible from pain and as rich as possible in enjoyments." He firmly believed that moral rules and obligations could be referenced to promoting happiness, which connects to having a noble character. While Mill is not a standard act utilitarian or rule utilitarian, he is a minimizing utilitarian, which "affirms that it would be desirable to maximize happiness for the greatest number, but not that we are morally required to do so."

=== Women's rights ===
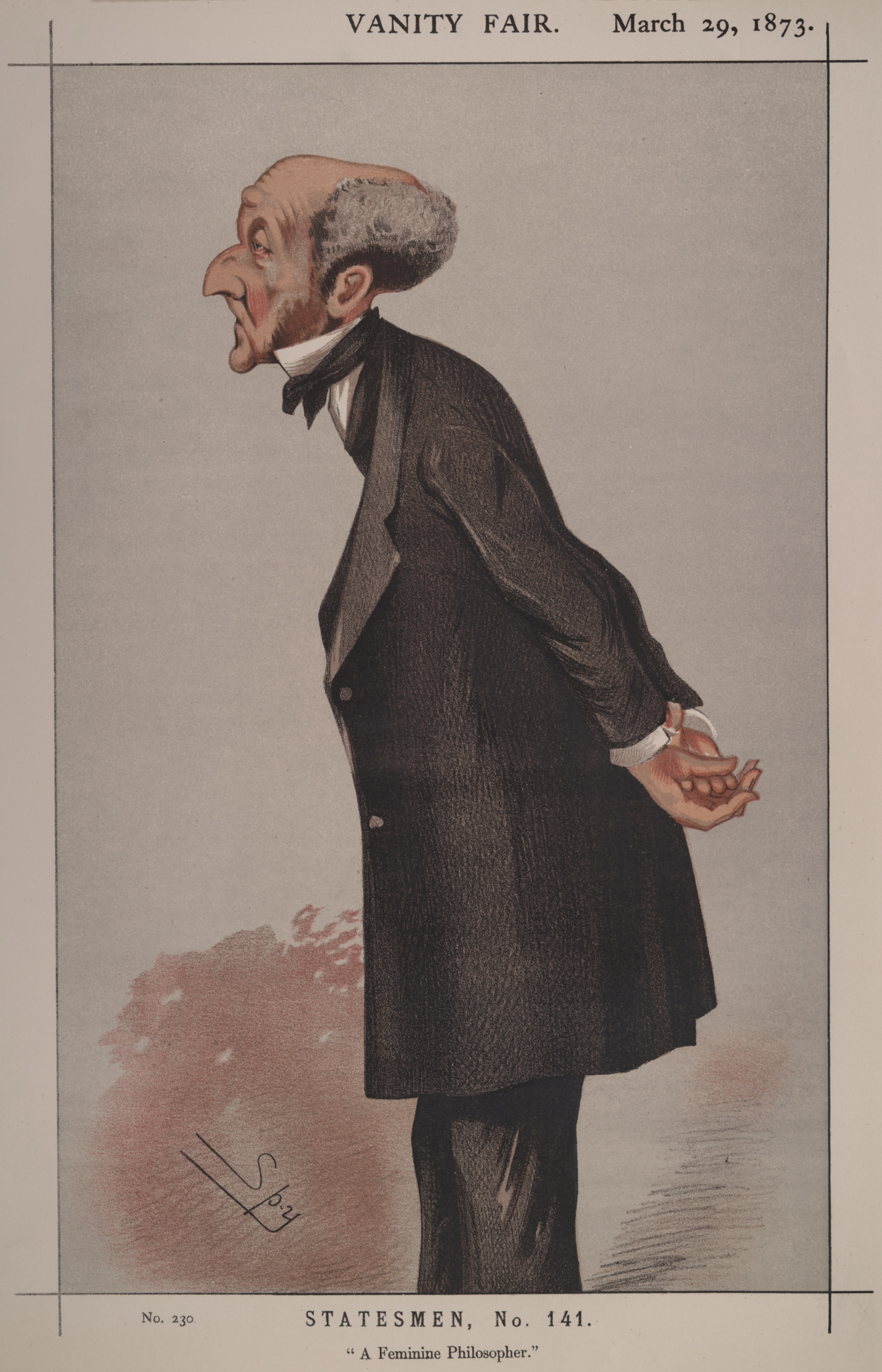
"A Feminine Philosopher". Caricature by Spy published in Vanity Fair in 1873.

Mill's view of history was that right up until his time "the whole of the female" and "the great majority of the male sex" were simply "slaves". He countered arguments to the contrary, arguing that relations between sexes simply amounted to "the legal subordination of one sex to the other – [which] is wrong itself, and now one of the chief hindrances to human improvement; and that it ought to be replaced by a principle of perfect equality." Here, then, we have an instance of Mill's use of "slavery" in a sense which, compared to its fundamental meaning of absolute unfreedom of person, is an extended and arguably a rhetorical rather than a literal sense.

With this, Mill can be considered among the earliest male proponents of gender equality, having been recruited by American feminist John Neal during his stay in London circa 1825–1827. His book The Subjection of Women (1861, publ.1869) is one of the earliest written on this subject by a male author. In The Subjection of Women, Mill attempts to make a case for perfect equality.

In his proposal for a universal education system sponsored by the state, Mill expands benefits for many marginalized groups, especially for women. For Mill, a universal education held the potential to create new abilities and novel types of behaviour of which the current receiving generation and their descendants could both benefit from. Such a pathway to opportunity would enable women to gain "industrial and social independence" that would allow them the same movement in their agency and citizenship as men. Mill's view of opportunity stands out in its reach, but even more so for the population he foresees who could benefit from it. Mill was hopeful of the autonomy such an education could allow for its recipients and especially for women. Through the consequential sophistication and knowledge attained, individuals are able to properly act in ways that recedes away from those leading towards overpopulation. This stands directly in contrast with the view held by many of Mill's contemporaries and predecessors who viewed such inclusive programs to be counterintuitive. Aiming such help at marginalized groups, such as the poor and working class, would only serve to reward them with the opportunity to move to a higher status, thus encouraging greater fertility which at its extreme could lead to overproduction.

He talks about the role of women in marriage and how it must be changed. Mill comments on three major facets of women's lives that he felt are hindering them:

1. society and gender construction;
2. education; and
3. marriage.

He argues that the oppression of women was one of the few remaining relics from ancient times, a set of prejudices that severely impeded the progress of humanity. As a Member of Parliament, Mill introduced an unsuccessful amendment to the Reform Bill to substitute the word "person" in place of "man".

== Personal life ==
He was godfather to the philosopher Bertrand Russell.

=== Marriage ===
On 21 April 1851, Mill married Harriet Taylor after 21 years of intimate friendship. Taylor was married when they met, and their relationship was close but generally believed to be chaste during the years before her first husband died in 1849. The couple waited two years before marrying in 1851. Upon marriage, he made a declaration to repudiate the rights conferred upon him over her by virtue of the marriage under Victorian law. John Stuart Mill and Harriet Taylor Mill were foundational figures in feminist economic thought. Their collaborative works, particularly The Subjection of Women (1869) and Taylor Mill's The Enfranchisement of Women (1851), argued that gender inequality was both a moral injustice and an economic inefficiency (Hansson, 2022; McCabe, 2021). Rejecting classical economic assumptions that marginalized women, they advocated for legal reforms, educational access, and women's autonomy. Their ideas laid the groundwork for modern feminist economists who critique unpaid labour, gender wage gaps, and structural oppression (Munte & Monica, 2023; Knüfer, 2023). Taylor Mill's Unitarian and rationalist views enriched this critique, while stylometric evidence supports her significant role in Mill's writings (Schmidt-Petri et al., 2021). Today, their arguments resonate in debates on digital capitalism, care work, and reproductive rights, offering a lens to assess economic justice through the interplay of gender, labour, and autonomy (Hampton, 2021; Smajdor, 2021). Accomplished in her own right, Taylor was a significant influence on Mill's work and ideas during both friendship and marriage. His relationship with Taylor reinforced Mill's advocacy of women's rights. He said that in his stand against domestic violence, and for women's rights he was "chiefly an amanuensis to my wife". He called her mind a "perfect instrument", and said she was "the most eminently qualified of all those known to the author". He cites her influence in his final revision of On Liberty, which was published shortly after her death. Taylor died in 1858 after developing severe lung congestion, after only seven years of marriage to Mill.

=== Religious views ===
In his views on religion, Mill was an agnostic and a sceptic, though Mill believed, in terms of proof on the right answer to the question of God's existence, that it is 'a very probable hypothesis'. He also saw as perfectly rational and legitimate to believe in God as an act of hope or as the result of one's efforts to discern the meaning of life as a whole.

=== Interests ===
Like other philosophers of his time, Mill was interested in botany. It is believed that approximately 1,000 of his specimens are held by the Museum Requien in Avignon, France, and Mill's stepdaughter, Helen Taylor, donated specimens to the Kew Herbarium after his death. In the southern hemisphere, there are also specimens at the National Herbarium of Victoria, Royal Botanic Gardens Victoria, Australia.

== Works ==
Title	Date	Source
"Two Letters on the Measure of Value"	1822	"The Traveller"
"Questions of Population"	1823	"Black Dwarf"
"War Expenditure"	1824	Westminster Review
"Quarterly Review – Political Economy"	1825	Westminster Review
"Review of Miss Martineau's Tales"	1830	Examiner
"The Spirit of the Age"	1831	Examiner
"Use and Abuse of Political Terms"	1832	
"What is Poetry"	1833, 1859	
"Rationale of Representation"	1835	
"De Tocqueville on Democracy in America [i]"	1835	
"State of Society in America"	1836	
"Civilization"	1836	
"Essay on Bentham"	1838	
"Essay on Coleridge"	1840	
"Essays on Government"	1840	
"De Tocqueville on Democracy in America [ii]"	1840	
A System of Logic	1843	
Essays on Some Unsettled Questions of Political Economy	1844	
"Claims of Labour"	1845	Edinburgh Review
Principles of Political Economy	1848	
"The Negro Question"	1850	Fraser's Magazine
"Reform of the Civil Service"	1854	
Dissertations and Discussions	1859	
A Few Words on Non-Intervention	1859	
On Liberty	1859	
Thoughts on Parliamentary Reform	1859	
Considerations on Representative Government	1861	
"Centralisation"	1862	Edinburgh Review
"The Contest in America"	1862	Harper's Magazine
Utilitarianism	1863	
An Examination of Sir William Hamilton's Philosophy	1865	
Auguste Comte and Positivism	1865	
Inaugural Address at St. Andrews Concerning the value of culture	1867	
"Speech in Favour of Capital Punishment"	1868	
England and Ireland	1868	
"Thornton on Labour and its Claims"	1869	Fortnightly Review
The Subjection of Women	1869	
Chapters and Speeches on the Irish Land Question	1870	
Autobiography	1873	
Three Essays on Religion: Nature, the Utility of Religion, and Theism	1874	Internet Archive
Socialism	1879	Belfords, Clarke & Co.
"Notes on N.W. Senior's Political Economy"	1945	Economica N.S. 12

== See also ==
- John Stuart Mill Institute
- Mill's methods of induction described 1843 book A System of Logic
- John Stuart Mill Library
- List of liberal theorists
- On Social Freedom, essay discovered and published posthumously in 1907
- Women's suffrage in the United Kingdom

== Notes ==
Parliament of the United Kingdom
Preceded by Sir George de Lacy Evans	Member of Parliament for Westminster; 1865–1868	Succeeded by William Henry Smith
Academic offices
Preceded by William Stirling of Keir	Rector of the University of St Andrews; 1865–1868	Succeeded by James Anthony Froude
