= Mill's methods =

Methods of induction by John Stuart Mill

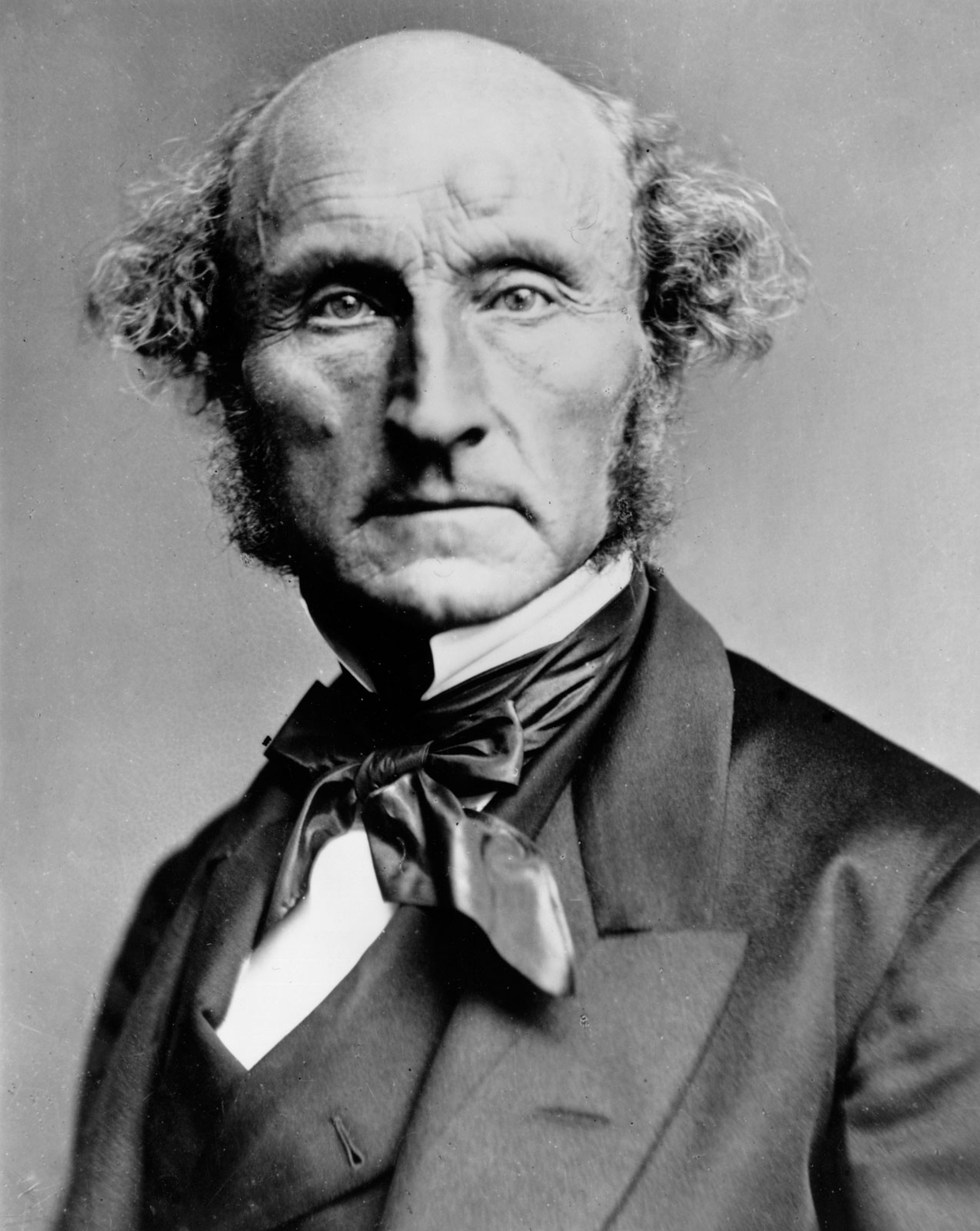
Mill, c. 1870

Mill's methods are five methods of induction described by philosopher John Stuart Mill in his 1843 book A System of Logic. They are intended to establish a causal relationship between two or more groups of data, analyzing their respective differences and similarities.

== The methods ==
=== Direct method of agreement ===
If two or more instances of the phenomenon under investigation have only one circumstance in common, the circumstance in which alone all the instances agree, is the cause (or effect) of the given phenomenon.

— John Stuart Mill, Mill, John Stuart (1843). A System of Logic, Vol. 1. John W. Parker. p. 454.

For a property to be a necessary condition it must always be present if the effect is present. Since this is so, then we are interested in looking at cases where the effect is present and taking note of which properties, among those considered to be 'possible necessary conditions' are present and which are absent. Obviously, any properties which are absent when the effect is present cannot be necessary conditions for the effect. This method is also referred to more generally within comparative politics as the most different systems design. Symbolically, the method of agreement can be represented as:

A B C D occur together with w x y z
A E F G occur together with w t u v
——————————————————
Therefore A is the cause, or the effect, of w.

To further illustrate this concept, consider two structurally different countries. Country A is a former colony, has a centre-left government, and has a federal system with two levels of government. Country B has never been a colony, has a centre-left government and is a unitary state. One factor that both countries have in common, the dependent variable in this case, is that they have a system of universal health care. Comparing the factors known about the countries above, a comparative political scientist would conclude that the government sitting on the centre-left of the spectrum would be the independent variable which causes a system of universal health care, since it is the only one of the factors examined which holds constant between the two countries, and the theoretical backing for that relationship is sound; social democratic (centre-left) policies often include universal health care.

=== Method of difference ===
If an instance in which the phenomenon under investigation occurs, and an instance in which it does not occur, have every circumstance save one in common, that one occurring only in the former; the circumstance in which alone the two instances differ, is the effect, or cause, or an indispensable part of the cause, of the phenomenon.

— John Stuart Mill, Mill, John Stuart (1843). A System of Logic, Vol. 1. John W. Parker. p. 455.

This method is also known more generally as the most similar systems design within comparative politics.

A B C D occur together with w x y z
B C D occur together with x y z
——————————————————
Therefore A is the cause, or the effect, or a part of the cause of w.

As an example of the method of difference, consider two similar countries. Country A has a centre-right government, a unitary system and was a former colony. Country B has a centre-right government, a unitary system but was never a colony. The difference between the countries is that Country A readily supports anti-colonial initiatives, whereas Country B does not. The method of difference would identify the independent variable to be the status of each country as a former colony or not, with the dependant variable being supportive for anti-colonial initiatives. This is because, out of the two similar countries compared, the difference between the two is whether or not they were formerly a colony. This then explains the difference on the values of the dependent variable, with the former colony being more likely to support decolonization than the country with no history of being a colony.

=== Indirect method of difference ===
If two or more instances in which the phenomenon occurs have only one circumstance in common, while two or more instances in which it does not occur have nothing in common save the absence of that circumstance; the circumstance in which alone the two sets of instances differ, is the effect, or cause, or a necessary part of the cause, of the phenomenon.

— John Stuart Mill, Mill, John Stuart (1843). A System of Logic, Vol. 1. John W. Parker. p. 463.

Also called the "Joint Method of Agreement and Difference", this principle is a combination of two methods of agreement. Despite the name, it is weaker than the direct method of difference and does not include it.

Symbolically, the Joint method of agreement and difference can be represented as:

A B C occur together with x y z
A D E occur together with x v w
F G occur with y w
——————————————————
Therefore A is the cause, or the effect, or a part of the cause of x.

=== Method of residue ===
Subduct from any phenomenon such part as is known by previous inductions to be the effect of certain antecedents, and the residue of the phenomenon is the effect of the remaining antecedents.

— John Stuart Mill, Mill, John Stuart (1843). A System of Logic, Vol. 1. John W. Parker. p. 465.

If a range of factors are believed to cause a range of phenomena, and we have matched all the factors, except one, with all the phenomena, except one, then the remaining phenomenon can be attributed to the remaining factor.

Symbolically, the Method of Residue can be represented as:

A B C occur together with x y z
B is known to be the cause of y
C is known to be the cause of z
——————————————————
Therefore A is the cause or effect of x.

=== Method of concomitant variations ===
Whatever phenomenon varies in any manner whenever another phenomenon varies in some particular manner, is either a cause or an effect of that phenomenon, or is connected with it through some fact of causation.

— John Stuart Mill, Mill, John Stuart (1843). A System of Logic, Vol. 1. John W. Parker. p. 470.

If across a range of circumstances leading to a phenomenon, some property of the phenomenon varies in tandem with some factor existing in the circumstances, then the phenomenon can be associated with that factor. For instance, suppose that various samples of water, each containing both salt and lead, were found to be toxic. If the level of toxicity varied in tandem with the level of lead, one could attribute the toxicity to the presence of lead.

Symbolically, the method of concomitant variation can be represented as (with ± representing a shift):

A B C occur together with x y z
A± B C results in x± y z.
—————————————————————
Therefore A and x are causally connected

Unlike the preceding four inductive methods, the method of concomitant variation doesn't involve the elimination of any circumstance. Changing the magnitude of one factor results in the change in the magnitude of another factor.

== See also ==
- Causal inference
- Controlled scientific experiments
- Baconian method
- Bayesian network
- Koch's postulates
