= Joe Cain (disambiguation) =

Joe Cain (1832–1904) was a Native American.

Joe or Joseph Cain may also refer to:

- Joe Cain (American football) (born 1965), American football linebacker
- Joe Cain (historian of science) (born 1964)
- Joe Cain (rugby union) for Leicester Tigers
- Joseph Alexander Cain (1920–1980), American painter, art educator and critic
- Joseph Hilliard Cain Sr. (1892–1962), American military officer and politician

== See also ==
- Joe Kane, American author
- Joseph Kane (disambiguation)
