= Joseph Kane (disambiguation) =

Joseph Kane was a filmmaker.

Joseph or Joe Kane may also refer to:

- Joe Kane, author and journalist
- Joe Kane, editor of Phantom of the Movies' Videoscope
- Joseph Nathan Kane (1899–2002), American non-fiction writer and journalist
- Joseph T. Kane, a perpetrator of the 2010 West Memphis police shootings

== See also ==
- Joseph Cain (disambiguation)
