= Leonard Ernest Bayliss =

English physiologist and author

Leonard Ernest Bayliss (15 November 1900 – 20 August 1964) was an English physiologist. and author. He is known for his work on the physiology of water-relations, including the maintenance of blood volume and kidney functioning. Leonard Bayliss is best known for revising a well-known textbook, Principles of general physiology in two volumes, that had first been written by his father William Bayliss. He also published Human Physiology, coauthored with F.R. Winton. He developed methods to study blood flow.

Bayliss was the son of William Bayliss and Gertrude, the sister of physiologist E.H. Starling. Leonard Bayliss studied at the University College School before going to Trinity College, Cambridge in 1922. He continued for his PhD as a Michael Foster Student and his thesis was on "tone in plain muscle." He was a Sharpey Scholar from 1926 to 1929 and from 1928 he visited University of Pennsylvania on a Rockefeller Fellowship, working on micropuncture techniques to study the kidneys of frogs under A.N. Richards.

Bayliss then went to work at the Marine Biological Laboratory at Plymouth before becoming a lecturer at the University of Edinburgh. During World War II, he worked for the Army Operational Research Group, studying the accuracy of anti-aircraft guns. In 1946 Baylisshelped establish the graduate course in physiology at University College.

Bayliss married M. Grace Eggleton, who had studied under E.H. Starling, his uncle. Bayliss died on 20 August 1964.
