= Videoscope =

Videoscope may refer to

- Videoscope (testing equipment), an alternative name for the video borescope.
- Videoscope (film distributor), Australian distributor of Dimboola and other films.
- The Phantom of the Movies' Videoscope, a US movie magazine released between 1993 and 2020.
