= Latchmere Recreation Ground, Battersea =

Park in Wandsworth, London

Latchmere Recreation Ground
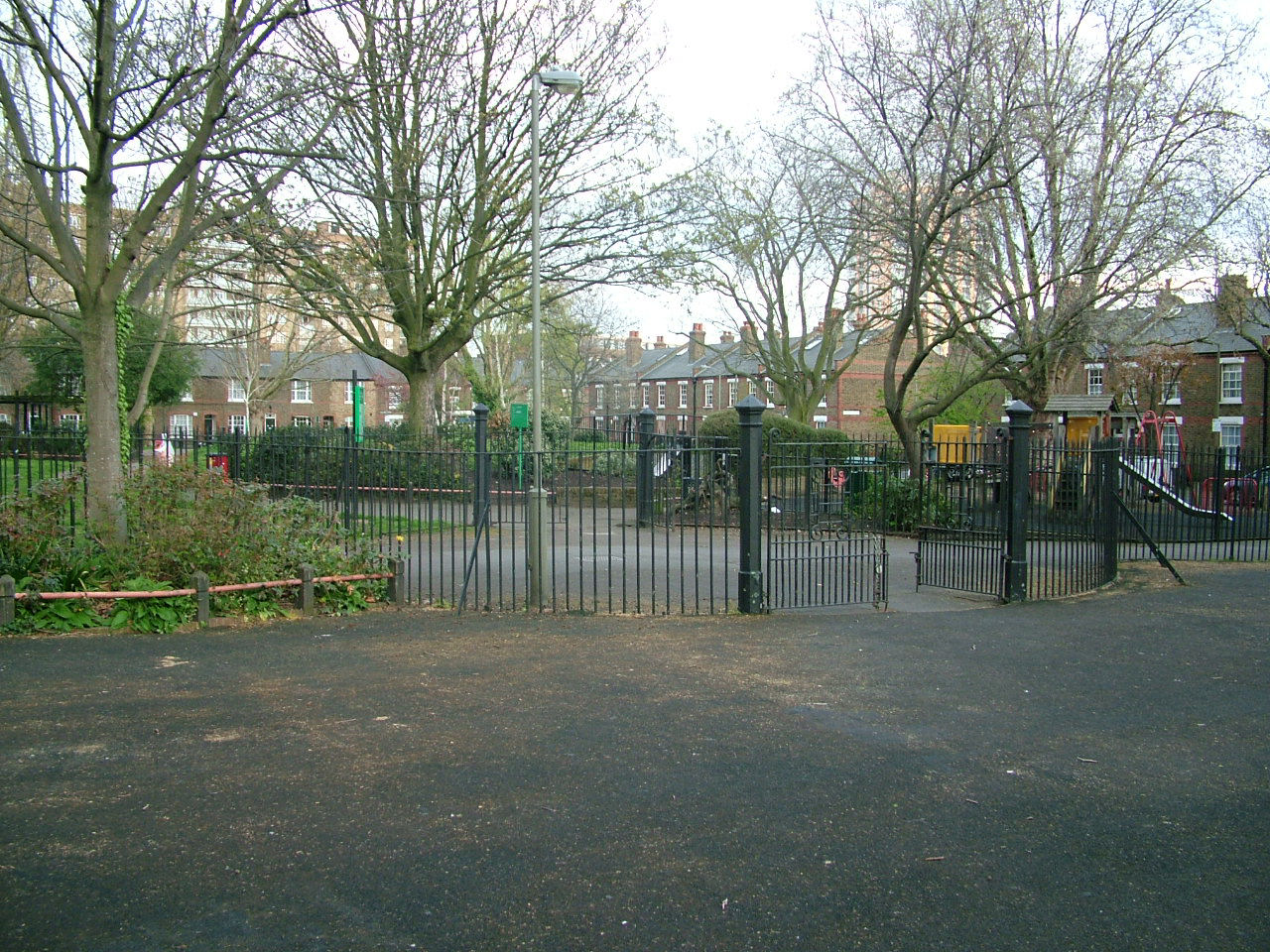
- Latchmere Recreation Ground / Latchmere Park
- Interactive map of Latchmere Recreation Ground
- Type: Public open space
- Location: Battersea
- Coordinates: 51.472°N 0.162°W
- Area: 0.75 hectares (1.9 acres)
- Created: 1902–1906
- Operator: London Borough of Wandsworth
- Open: Dawn till dusk. All year
- Status: conservation area

Latchmere Recreation Ground or Latchmere Park is a public open space with a children's playground in Battersea in the London Borough of Wandsworth. It is located approximately 300 metres (330 yd) south of the far larger Battersea Park and the River Thames beyond. It is bounded by Burns Road to the south and Reform Street to the east and north. The former Latchmere School site, converted to housing in 1996, forms the eastern boundary.

Latchmere Recreation Ground is a slightly humped, quadrilateral-shaped area mostly laid out to amenity grass with trees and intermittent shrub beds around the perimeter and specimen trees in the interior. The park is surrounded by low metal railing fencing. Pedestrian access is via gateways opposite St James' Grove mid-way on the northern side which leads via a wide footpath to another due south on Burns Road. This footpath is designated as a public highway. Another footpath with vehicle access has its entrance on Reform Street on the eastern side. This path intersects the other at a wide circular paved space then curves south to a second gateway further west on Burns Road. Children's playground areas lie centrally on either side of the pathways.

The site is currently maintained and managed by Wandsworth Council in conjunction with Enable Leisure and Culture and their amenity and arboricultural maintenance contractors.

== History ==
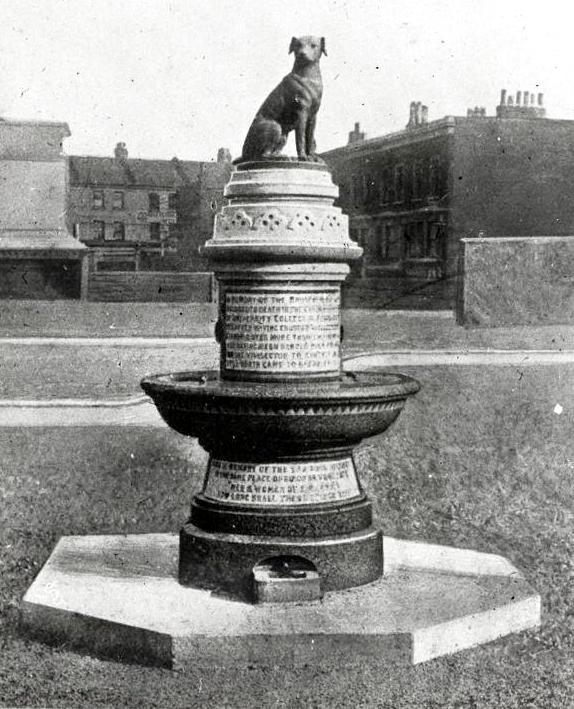
The Brown Dog by Joseph Whitehead, erected in 1906 in Battersea's Latchmere Recreation Ground, subsequently removed and presumed destroyed.

The area was originally common land: Latchmoor Common or Latchmere Common.

The common was increasingly converted to allotments at the end of the 19th-century. Pressure from the local vestry to develop the land for housing resulted in the Latchmere Estate housing development led by local politician, John Burns MP. Building work commenced from 1902 and was one of the earliest examples of public social housing development to be executed by a local council. The creation of the recreation ground and preservation of some of the historic amenity value of the land was a condition of the development and the park formally opened in 1906. Plans initiated in 1903 to extend the estate and develop on the recreation ground area itself were defeated as the developers were unable to fulfil an obligation to provide suitable replacement recreational land, and their proposal of a site outside the borough at Wandsworth Common was rejected. It achieved notoriety very soon after, being the focal point of the Brown Dog affair as the location of a statue to commemorate a brown dog involved in vivisection. The statue was sited on a plinth in the central circular area of the park until, amidst the related controversy, it was removed and presumably destroyed.
