= Bayliss and Starling Society =

The Bayliss and Starling Society was founded in 1979 as a forum for research scientists with specific interests in the chemistry, physiology and function of central and autonomic peptides.

The society was named in honour of William Bayliss and Ernest Starling, who discovered the gastrointestinal peptide secretin in 1902 and coined the term hormone in 1905. The society's main objective was to "advance education and science by the promotion, for the benefit of the public, the study of the chemistry, physiology and disorders of central and peripheral regulating peptides and by the dissemination of the results of such study and research." In doing so, the Society promoted research into peptides and facilitated scientists with research interests in peptides by aiding in the organisation of symposia and relevant conferences.

Additionally the Society offered the John Calam Travelling Fellowship Award for members who wanted to attend national and international academic conferences or visit laboratories to gain experience in new techniques to facilitate their research.

The Bayliss and Starling Society merged with The Physiological Society in 2014.
