= Horse Memorial =

Provincial heritage site in Port Elizabeth, Eastern Cape, South Africa

- Perdstandbeeld
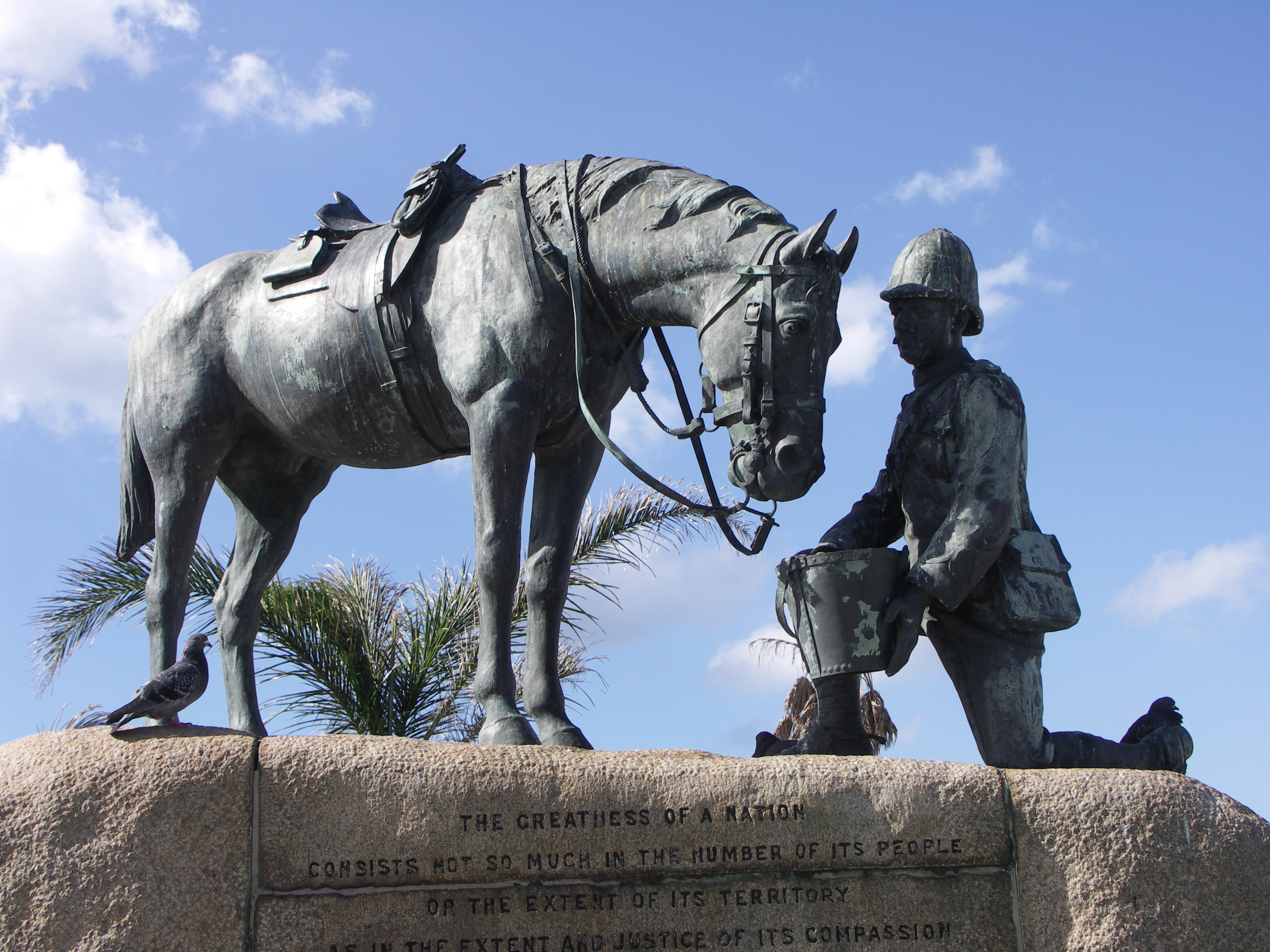
- Interactive map of Horse Memorial
- Location: Gqeberha, Eastern Cape, South Africa
- Coordinates: 33.9622°S 25.6094°E
- Designer: Joseph Whitehead
- Opening date: 1905
- Dedicated to: Horses in the Second Boer War

The Horse Memorial (Afrikaans: Perdstandbeeld) is a provincial heritage site in Gqeberha in the Eastern Cape province of South Africa, in memory of the horses that served and died during the Second Boer War, where Britain brought a large number of horses to South Africa. Designed by Joseph Whitehead, the life-sized bronze memorial features a kneeling soldier presenting a bucket of water to a service horse.

== History ==
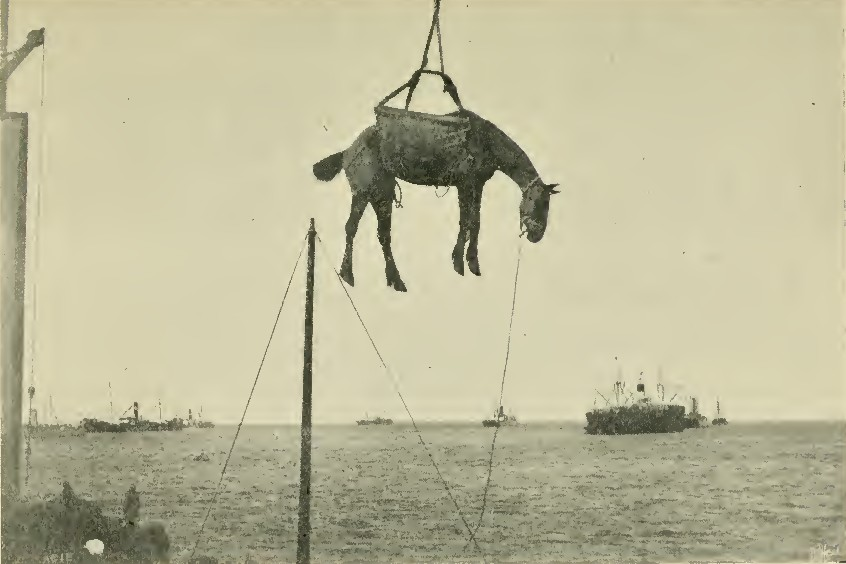
A horse bound for the front is offloaded at Port Elizabeth during the Second Boer War

During the Second Boer War, Britain brought a large number of horses to South Africa; it is estimated that the total cost of all the horses acquired for the war was around £7,000,000. More than 300,000 horses died in British service in South Africa.

One of the principal reasons for Port Elizabeth taking such an interest in the movement, which started in 1901, was that most of the horses brought to this country were landed there. The horses were shipped from all over the world, including 50,000 from the United States and 35,000 from Australia.

A ladies committee was formed with Mrs Harriet Meyer as president and £800 was collected for Messrs Whitehead and Sons, of Kennington and Westminster, to erect the statue. The statue was originally located close to the junction of Park Drive and Rink Street, next to St George's Park, but was moved to its present position in Cape Road in the 1950s. The Mayor said in his unveiling speech:

The unveiling of this monument marks the completion of what has been an arduous undertaking on the part of those ladies with whom the idea of raising a monument to the horses originated.
To raise a monument to the "brutes" that perish is considered by many to be misplaced sentiment, while some are inclined to think with Louis Wain "that all animals have their season of happiness in a hereafter before their final effacement, as a reward for the trials they undergo in life, while under the dominion of man."

— Alexander Fettes, Mayor of Port Elizabeth

== Design ==
The horse stands 16.2 hands (66 inches, 168 cm), and the figure of the soldier is life size. In addition to the memorial proper, there is a drinking trough for horses and cattle, and the wants of the thirsty wayfarer are also provided for. The design as a whole is an object lesson in kindness, and may appeal to the cruel or careless driver, and teach him that there are some who do not think it beneath them to attend to the wants of animals placed under their charge.

The memorial was described in the Government Gazette as

This memorial, designed by Joseph Whitehead and cast in bronze by Cox and Company, Thames Ditton Works in Surrey, was unveiled on 11 February 1905 by the Mayor of Port Elizabeth, Mr Alexander Fettes. The monument commemorates the horses that suffered and died during the Anglo-boer War (1899–1902). ...consisting of life-sized bronze figures of a horse about to quench its thirst from a bucket held by a kneeling soldier, together with the inscribed granite plinth on which it stands and the base of which incorporates a drinking trough.

The inscription on the base reads:

THE GREATNESS OF A NATION
CONSISTS NOT SO MUCH IN THE NUMBER OF ITS PEOPLE
OR THE EXTENT OF ITS TERRITORY
AS IN THE EXTENT AND JUSTICE OF ITS COMPASSION

ERECTED BY PUBLIC SUBSCRIPTION
IN RECOGNITION OF THE SERVICES OF THE GALLANT ANIMALS
WHICH PERISHED IN THE ANGLO BOER WAR 1899–1902

== Vandalism ==
On 6 April 2015, the memorial was vandalised by a group of men associated with the far left Economic Freedom Fighters. The monument was one of a number of colonial era statues and memorials vandalised after the spread of the Rhodes Must Fall campaign, in March 2015, which aimed to move a statue of Cecil John Rhodes from the University of Cape Town.

== See also ==
- Animals in War Memorial
- Horses in the Second Boer War
- Horses in warfare
- Cavalry
- Joseph Whitehead
