= Walter Gratzer =

German-born British biophysical chemist (1932–2021)

- Born: Walter Bruno Gratzer; 20 September 1932; Breslau
- Died: 20 October 2021 (aged 89); London
- Education: University of Oxford (MA, 1958); National Institute for Medical Research (PhD, 1960)
- Occupation: Biophysical chemist

Walter Bruno Gratzer (20 September 1932 – 20 October 2021) was a German-born British biophysical chemist and science writer.

== Career ==
Gratzer was born in a Jewish hospital in Breslau (now Wrocław). Gratzer and his parents escaped Nazi persecution by escaping to Czechoslovakia and the United Kingdom in 1939. He lived in Belsize Park and then Cheltenham. He won a scholarship to Cheltenham grammar school.

Gratzer completed at University of Oxford a BA in chemistry in 1954, followed by an MA in 1958. His PhD was completed at National Institute for Medical Research in 1960. He was a research fellow at Harvard University from 1960 to 1963, a lecturer in biophysics at King's from 1963 to 1966, and worked at the Medical Research Council from 1966 to 1996.

He was professor of biophysical chemistry at King's College London and an author and reviewer of popular science. He was the first Nature news correspondent appointed by editor John Maddox. Oliver Sacks of Nature writes that his reviews have high literary quality and show knowledge of a wide range of topics. Gratzer was a friend of James D. Watson, and wrote the introduction and afterword of his A Passion for DNA. He died in London on 20 October 2021.

== Publications ==
=== Books ===
- The Longman Literary Companion to Science (1989) (editor)
- A Bedside Nature: Genius and Eccentricity in Science 1869–1953 (1996)
- The Undergrowth of Science: Delusion, Self-Deception and Human Frailty (2000) (Google Books)
- Eurekas and Euphorias: The Oxford Book of Scientific Anecdotes (2002) [2004] (Google Books)
- Terrors of the Table: The Curious History of Nutrition (2005) [2007] (Google Books)
- Giant Molecules: From Nylon to Nanotubes (2009) (Google Books)

=== Reviews ===
- "Review of A Short History of Cardiology by Peter Fleming". London Review of Books. 19 (13): 24. 1997.
- Gratzer, Walter (1998). "Per ardua ad Stockholm". Nature. 393 (6686): 640–641. doi:10.1038/31388..
- Morrison, Douglas R. O. (2000). "Now you see it, now you don't". Nature. 408 (6808): 24–25. doi:10.1038/35040637..
- Gratzer, Walter (2003). "A stranger in a strange land". Nature. 424 (6950): 725. doi:10.1038/424725a..

=== Articles ===
- Gratzer, Walter (5 March 2002). "Max Perutz (1914–2002)". Current Biology. 12 (5): R152–R154. Bibcode:2002CBio...12.R152G. doi:10.1016/S0960-9822(02)00727-3. S2CID 30263181.
- Gratzer, Walter (2004). "Obituary: Maurice Wilkins (1916–2004)". Nature. 431 (7011): 922. doi:10.1038/431922a. PMID 15496909.
- Gratzer, Walter (2007). "Nature — The Maddox Years". Nature. doi:10.1038/nature06241.
- Gratzer, Walter (2008). "Embryologist in Eden, a review of The Man Who Loved China: The Fantastic Story of the Eccentric Scientist Who Unlocked the Mysteries of the Middle Kingdom by Simon Winchester (2008), Harper Collins, New York". The FASEB Journal. 22 (10): 3415–3416. doi:10.1096/fj.08-1002ufm.
- Gratzer, Walter. "Retrospective: Charles Tanford (1921–2009)" (PDF). Archived from the original on 17 July 2011. (131 KB), ASBMB Today, December 2009, pp. 15–17, accessed 7 November 2010. by WebCite on 7 November 2010. See HTML version here. on 7 November 2010.

=== Academic papers ===
- Pinder, JC et al. "Actomyosin motor in the merozoite of the malaria parasite, Plasmodium falciparum: implications for red cell invasion", Journal of Cell Science 111 (13): 1831–1839, 1998, accessed 10 November 2010.
