= Joseph Whitehead (sculptor) =

English sculptor and stonemason

Joseph James Whitehead
- Born: 18 January 1868
- Died: 17 January 1951 (aged 82)
- Style: sculptor and stonemason

Joseph James Whitehead (18 January 1868 – 17 January 1951) was an English sculptor and stonemason.

== Life ==
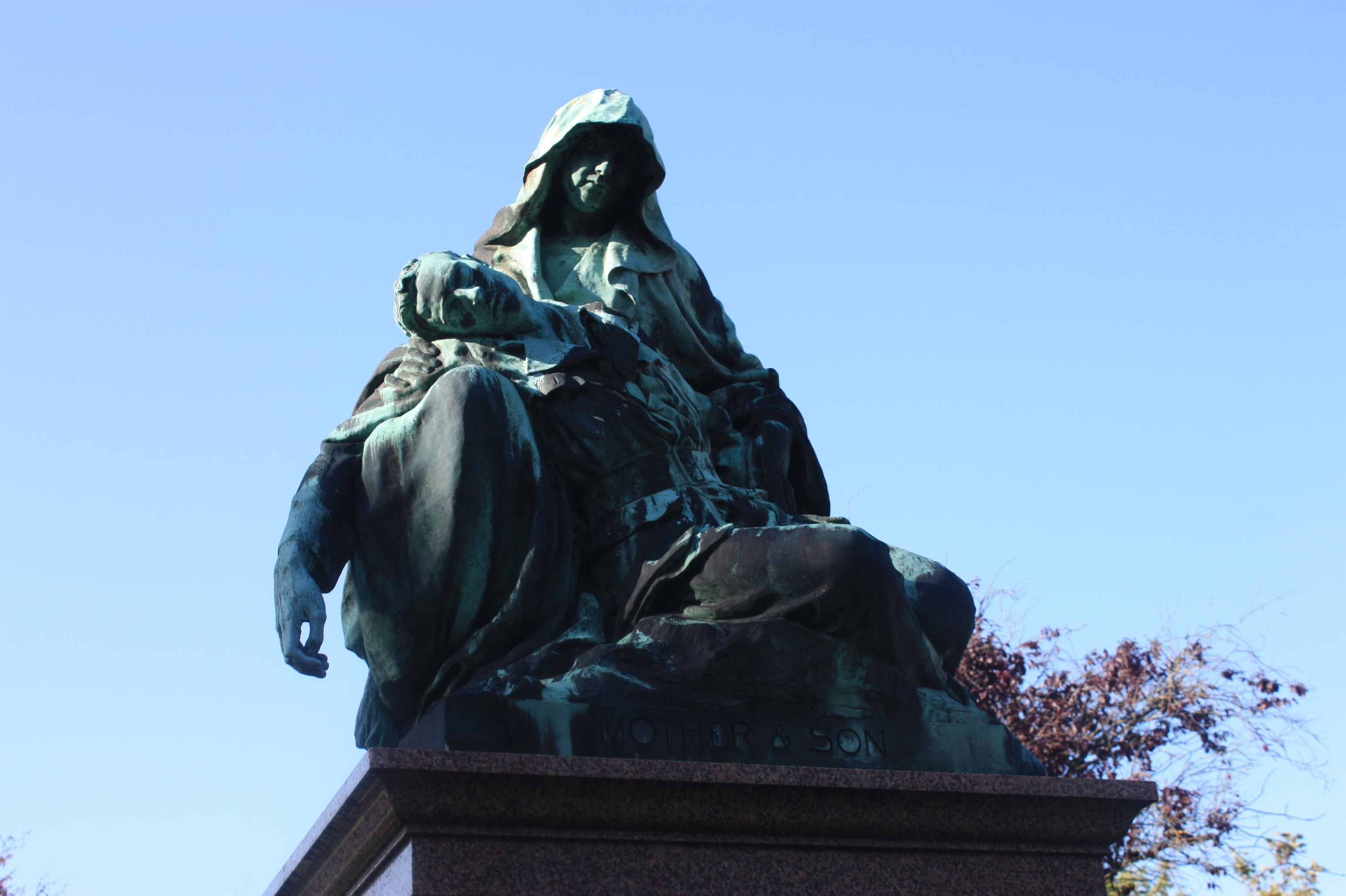
Mother and Son by Joseph Whitehead, Woodside Cemetery, Paisley

He was born in Aston, Birmingham, the son of John Whitehead (1845–1904), also a sculptor. He joined the family sculpting company, J. Whitehead and Son, which ran studios at 64 Kennington Road, 74 Rochester Row, and Vincent Square, London.

Whitehead is known, in particular, for the creation of a monument to Father Damien in Molokai, Hawaii (circa 1891); a statue of John Rae in Kirkwall Cathedral, Orkney; the Brown Dog memorial in Battersea, London (1906); a statue of Charles Kingsley in Bideford, Devon (1906); a sculpture on the Titanic Memorial in Andrews Park, Southampton (1914); and several war memorials in London and Stafford.

He exhibited in the Royal Academy of Arts 1889 to 1895.

The work on the Titanic Memorial was only partial, and under the supervision of William Hamo Thornycroft, master sculptor. The monument was unveiled in 1914. Whitehead's contribution is a figure of Charles Frederick William Hatfield (1879–1954), an engineer for the White Star Line, who, although not on the Titanic, is representative of others of that trade lost on the day.

His monument of "Mother and Son" in Woodside Cemetery, Paisley is typical of his skills. It is a modernised version of Michelangelo's "Pieta" in St Peters in Rome, and has huge emotion. Although technically for a single soldier, Lt Daniel Duncan, and his mother who died of grief three months later it is often seen as emblematic of the futility of war in general.

== See also ==
- Horse Memorial
