= The Phantom of the Movies' Videoscope =

The Phantom of the Movies' Videoscope is an American movie magazine devoted to cult cinema and genre movies and exploitation films that was released four times a year through end its end with issue #115 (Fall 2020), after the death of its primary founder and editor, Joe Kane. Sometimes, though not on the cover, the last word in the magazine's title is spelled VideoScope.

== History ==
The Phantom of the Movies' Videoscope started as a newsletter in 1993, and after 14 issues became a glossy-cover magazine. The publication was founded and is edited by Joe Kane (not the author and National Geographic journalist Joe Kane). It has spawned a reference book entitled The Phantom of the Movies' Videoscope: The Ultimate Guide to the Latest, Greatest, and Weirdest Genre Videos.

As the librarian service magazine Library Tech Files described the magazine:

Inside you can find over eighty different genre reviews of classic and contemporary exploitation movies. It provides a best of both worlds. The Italian film aficionado can read up on the rarely reviewed 1970'S Euro-Horror flicks of Amando De Ossorio. The modern horror-hound can whet his appetite with a look at the up-and-coming bright directors highlighted in Joseph Perry's always enlightening column, 'Best of the Fests' – a thoughtful examination of the newest films from future movers and shakers.

Issues have included interviews with such genre and exploitation-film directors as John Waters, James Gunn, Roger Corman, George A. Romero, Walter Hill and Brian Yuzna and such cult actors as Crispin Glover, Adrienne Barbeau, L. Q. Jones, Tobin Bell, and Clint Howard. In addition to Kane, the magazine's writers included Max Allan Collins, Dan Cziraky, Terry and Tiffany DuFoe, Robert Freese, Tim Ferrante, Don Kaye, Dwight Kemper, Nancy Naglin, Debbie Rochon, Kevin G. Shinnick, Calum Waddell, and Tom Weaver.

The magazine was based in Ocean Grove, New Jersey. The website remains active as of November 2021.

== Legacy ==
Joe Kane and The Phantom of the Movies' Videoscope have been cited in books including Universal Terrors, 1951-1955, Horror Noir, Character Kings 2, and Claws & Saucers: Science Fiction, Horror, and Fantasy Film 1902-1982.

Entertainment Weekly said the book The Phantom of the Movies' Videoscope "aims to separate the wheat from the chaff. A noble endeavor, to be sure — after all, filmmakers like Martin Scorsese, Jonathan Demme, James Cameron, and Ron Howard all got their start in this Hollywood basement — but Kane's wildly inconsistent critical eye (both Schwarzenegger's The Running Man and the out-of-place Apocalypse Now get 3 1/2 stars) makes the book more entertaining than useful."

Kane appears in the 2015 Moe Howard documentary Hey Moe! Hey Dad!. As an exploitation-film authority, he has been quotes in The New York Times. In 2021, Kane was inducted posthumously into the Rondo Hatton Classic Horror Awards' Monster Kid Hall of Fame.

The Phantom of the Movies' Videoscope Collection within the University of Pittsburgh Horror Studies Collection comprises the complete run of the magazine that has been digitized and made available online.

== Joe Kane ==
Joe Kane started writing professionally while attending Queens College in New York City:

Actually, the first three pieces I sold were all college class assignments—an article on doomsday movies my film course teacher suggested I submit to Take One magazine; a short story/memoir my English teacher submitted to a Doubleday anthology called 'Growing Up in America'; and a media course paper on how comic strips reflected the changing culture, which New Times used as a cover story, illustrated by legendary underground cartoonist Yossarian, no less. My main areas of interest were fiction, satire and genre-movie criticism, though I wrote a bit about rock music and other pop-culture topics, as well. I also co-won the Queens College literary award my senior year, which paid cash, which, as Yogi [Berra] points out, is just as good as money.

After college, living in New York City's East Village, he wrote humorous pornographic stories for the periodicals Luv and Bang, and worked for three months as a file clerk at an insurance company. He began doing work for Screw X, a spin-off of Screw. The art directors, Larry Brill and Les Waldstein, left to found The Monster Times, which Kane called "sort of a Famous Monsters of Filmland filtered through an NYC underground attitude in an East Village Other vein."

Kane joined the original editorial staff in 1972, and later than year became its editor in chief through its cancelation in 1976. He then became an editor at Screw. In 1984, at the suggestion of a New York Daily News editor, Susan Toepfer, Kane began reviewing genre movies for that newspaper, using the pen name, later his registered trademark, The Phantom of the Movies, with many reviews followed with a memorably laughable movie quote, under the subhead "Wish I'd Said That." He also wrote a companion column reviewing home video, "Mondo Video." In 1993, he began publishing the genre-film magazine The Phantom of the Movies' Videoscope. During a time of uncertainty over the future of the Daily News, Kane launched a spin-off newsletter. A mention of it in his column brought in some subscribers and "seed money to launch the newsletter, with the invaluable assistance of my wife (writer Nancy Naglin) and my writer friend Tim Ferrante, in early 1993. After 14 issues, we expanded to a magazine format."

His work also appeared in magazines and newspapers including The National Lampoon, Maxim, The Washington Times, The Village Voice, and High Times, which serialized his series "Dope in the Cinema." Kane also published a satiric science-fiction short story called “Death After Death” in Penthouse.

Kane died November 1, 2020. He was survived by wife Naglin and his sister, Joan Nichols. In 2021, he was posthumously inducted into the Rondo Hatton Classic Horror Awards' Monster Kid Hall of Fame.

== Works ==
Books

- Kane, Joe (1982). Baseball's Dream Team. Ace Books. ISBN 978-0448169224.
- Kane, Joe (2000). The Phantom of the Movies' Videoscope: The Ultimate Guide to the Latest, Greatest, and Weirdest Genre Videos. New York, New York: Three Rivers Press. ISBN 0-8129-3149-1
- Kane, Joe (1989). The Phantom's Ultimate Video Guide. New York, New York: Dell Books. ISBN 0-440-50212-8
- Kane, Joe (2010). Night of the Living Dead: Behind the Scenes of the Most Terrifying Zombie Movie Ever. New York, New York: Citadel Press. ISBN 0-8065-3331-5
- Kane, Joe (2012). Masters of Midnight! (Cult-Film Confidential Book 1). PhanMedia.
- Found Footage: How the Astro-Zombies Saved My Life and Other Tales of Movie Madness. CreateSpace Independent Publishing Platform. 2018. ISBN 1718731590; ISBN 978-1718731592.
