= Latchmere Estate =

Housing estate in Battersea, London

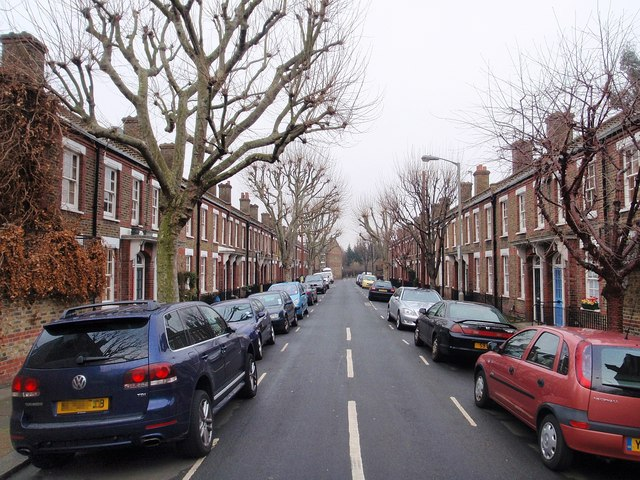
- Odger Street in Latchmere Estate
- Interactive map of Latchmere Estate

General information
- Coordinates: 51°28′18″N 0°09′42″W

Construction
- Constructed: 1903

Latchmere Estate is a housing estate in Battersea, Greater London, which was constructed in 1903. It is the first example of a housing estate built with labour directly employed by a local council authority.

Between 1832 and the 1880s, Battersea's population increased from 5,500 to 107,000, meaning new housing needed to be constructed. The land used for the estate had previously been allotments for the poor, but with the new need for housing, this was no longer considered a productive use of space.

In the 1890s, John Burns, the MP for Battersea, secured acts of parliament allowing for the construction of the estate on the former Latchmere Common. A design competition was held which attracted 58 entries in 1901, and construction began soon after. For the time, the estate contained things like electric lighting and combined ranges which were considered luxuries. Opening the estate, the Mayor declared that, "The dwellings were novel of their kind, containing as they did what had once been regarded as luxuries, such as baths, combined ranges and electric light. Not many working men had such accommodation in which to bring up their families, but the Battersea Borough Council had come to the conclusion that such accommodation was an absolute necessity."

The estate was built with 315 dwellings, "28 five-room houses, one four-room house, 70 houses each with two three-room tenements with bath scullery and 73 houses each with two four-room tenements with bath scullery."

The English Heritage Survey of London (2013) calls the estate "the most vivid extant reminder of the efforts undertaken in Battersea’s heyday as a progressive municipality to better the life of its working classes". According to Sean Creighton, "The Estate's street names Freedom, Reform Sts, Odger, Joubert, Matthews and Burns all have a special meaning, reflecting the particular liberal, radical and socialist politics of its controlling Progressive Alliance."

The estate is now part of Wandsworth Council's Latchmere Estate Conservation Area, which was designated in 1974. A planning strategy for the conservation area was published by the council in 2007.
