= Ernest Starling =

British physiologist (1866–1927)

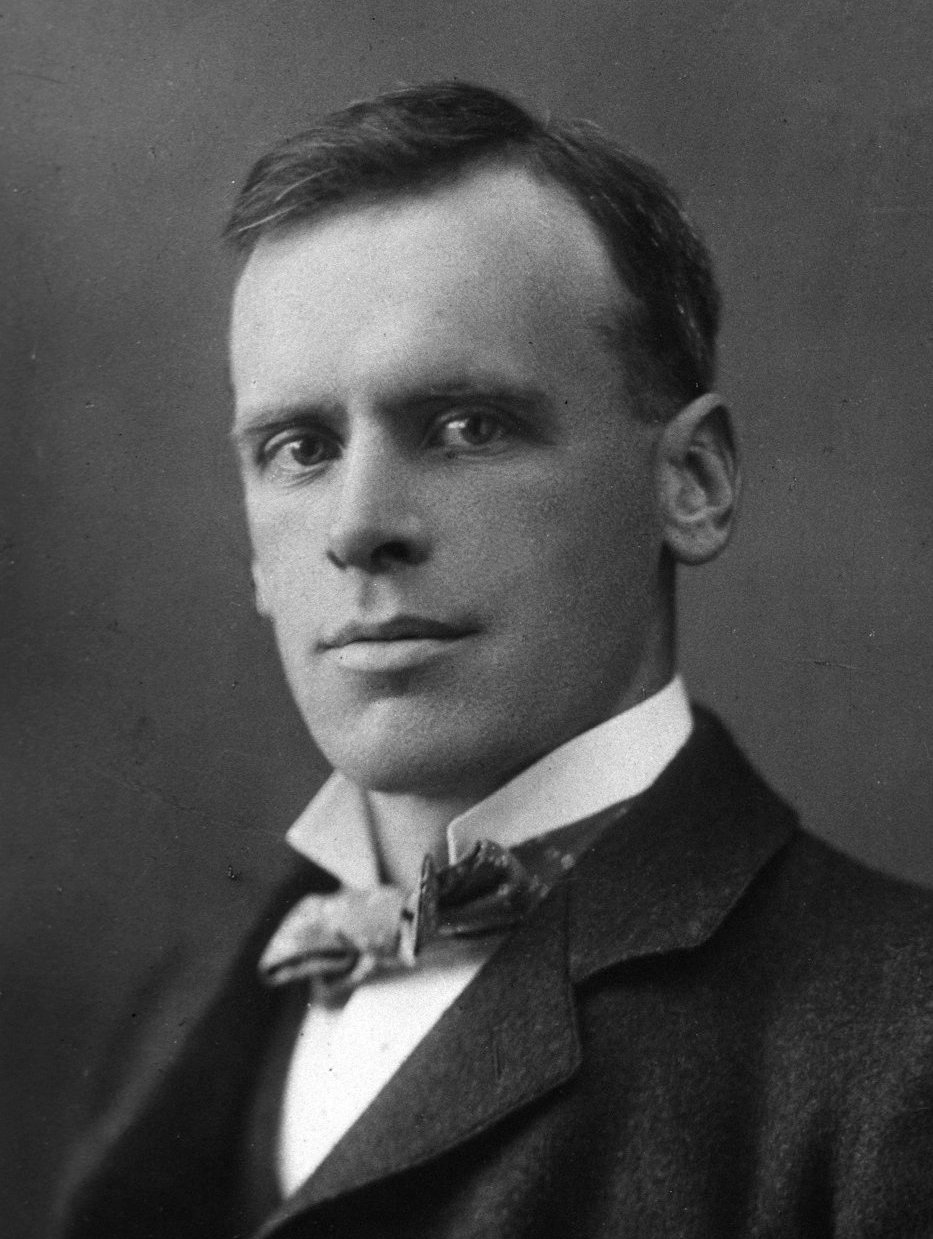
- Ernest Starling
- Born: 17 April 1866; London
- Died: 2 May 1927 (aged 61); Kingston Harbour, Jamaica
- Known for: Frank–Starling law of the heart
- Awards: Royal Medal (1913)
- Scientific career
- Fields: Physiology
- Workplaces: University College London

Ernest Henry Starling CMG FRCP FRS (17 April 1866 – 2 May 1927) was a British physiologist who contributed many fundamental ideas to the subject. These ideas were important parts of the British contribution to physiology, which at that time led the world.

He made at least four significant contributions: 1. In the capillary, water is forced out through the pores in the wall by hydrostatic pressure and driven in by the osmotic pressure of plasma proteins (or oncotic pressure). These opposing forces approximately balance; which is known as Starling's Principle. 2. The discovery of the hormone secretin—with his brother-in-law William Bayliss—and the introduction of the word hormone. 3. The analysis of the heart's activity as a pump, which is known as the Frank–Starling law. 4. Several fundamental observations on the action of the kidneys. These include evidence for the existence of vasopressin, the anti-diuretic hormone. He also wrote the leading textbook of physiology in English, which ran through 20 editions.

== Rising to prominence ==
Ernest Starling became a medical student at Guy's Hospital, London, in 1882 (when he was 16). He had a brilliant career there and set his sights on becoming a Harley Street physician. But the science behind medicine—physiology—attracted him much more; he spent a long vacation in Wilhelm Kühne's laboratory in Heidelberg, studying the mechanisms of lymph formation and convinced himself that he could become a physiologist. At that time such a job description did not exist in Britain.

Guy's had no physiological laboratories, but Starling's enthusiasm changed all this, and he published nine papers on lymph and capillary function between 1893 and 1897. He showed that there are opposing forces across the capillary wall—an outward movement of water due to hydrostatic pressure (derived from the heart's contraction) and an inward movement, secondary to the osmotic pressure of the plasma proteins within the capillary. Without awareness of these forces, the physician cannot begin to understand such conditions as edema. The inward and outward forces are often referred to as "Starling forces". They established him as a serious contributor.

He was elected a Fellow of the Royal Society in 1899.

== Hormones ==
Starling enjoyed collaborating with William Bayliss (1860–1924), who was on the staff of University College London (UCL), and together they published on the electrical activity of the heart and on peristalsis. In 1891, when he was 25, Starling married Florence Amelia Wooldridge, the widow of Leonard Charles Wooldridge, who had been his physiology teacher at Guy's and died at the age of 32. She was a great support to Starling as a sounding board, secretary, and manager of his affairs as well as mother of their four children. In 1893 Bayliss married Gertrude, Starling's sister, so the two were brothers-in-law. When Starling was appointed professor at UCL in 1899, the scientific family was even closer. Bayliss and Starling were in the newspaper's headlines when involved in the Brown Dog affair, a controversy relating to vivisection.

Bayliss and Starling investigated pancreatic secretion, which at that time was believed to be entirely under nervous control. They showed that whenever food or acid was put into the duodenum some blood-borne stimulus was released, causing the pancreas to secrete. They called this substance secretin and Starling proposed that the body produces many secretin-like molecules, and in 1905 proposed that these substances should be called hormones. By doing this, he began a whole new biological subject, which became known as endocrinology.

== Medical education ==
Starling felt passionately about many subjects, one of which was medical education. He found the lack of science behind medical practice intolerable, and when in 1910 a Royal Commission (The Haldane Commission) was set up to improve medical education, Starling was an enthusiastic contributor. One of the consequences of the commission was the establishment of medical units in London teaching hospitals: clinical practice supported by laboratory research is now taken for granted in every large institution. For this, we must thank Starling's and William Osler's evidence given before the Haldane Commission.

== The law of the heart ==
The physiological discovery most often associated with Starling is the Law of the Heart. Occupying two years of his life (1910–1912) his investigations examined how the heart increased its output in response to more blood entering the organ, which increases the size of the chambers during filling. For this work he made use of the anaesthetized dog, in an experimental arrangement known as the heart-lung preparation. This played an important role in subsequent experiments, when he was not primarily interested in blood flow.

Starling was unaware of previous work by a German physiologist, Otto Frank, using the isolated frog heart. Frank showed that the longer the heart-muscle fibres were stretched the stronger the contraction. He did this with no interest in the circulation as a whole, so his findings have to be taken in parallel with Starling's, thus it became the Frank–Starling law.

== World War I ==
During the 1914–1918 war, Starling first was involved in research into poison gases. As a commissioned officer he found the organization of the matter chaotic and on several occasions was very outspoken to his war office superiors. This did his prospects no good at all. Many of his distinguished contemporaries received knighthoods. Starling was awarded a CMG. He resigned from the army in June 1917 and finally was able to undertake war work that utilized his abilities. As chairman of the Royal Society Food (War) Committee, he was instrumental in setting up rationing that provided needed calories and also the nutritional supplements then known. Rationing actually improved nutrition in wartime Britain. Germany had a similar food shortage during the war, but coped with it disastrously.

== Post-war ==
Starling returned to UCL at the end of the war. His wartime experiences had left him with a scathing vision on how the country was run, and in particular the educational system. He was especially outspoken on public (the British designation for private) school education. And particularly the teaching of classics themes: "After nine years, nine-tenths of the boys can read neither Latin nor Greek. They may have acquired a few catchwords or allusions to classical mythology, but they can give no account of the manner in which the Greeks lived, or the part played by Greek philosophy in the evolution of modern ideas, or in the way in which western government has been founded on Roman inventions."

During the 1920s he was very busy doing experiments and his reputation attracted distinguished collaborators. Many of these involved the heart-lung preparation. It was used to investigate the control of blood pressure (with G. V. Anrep), the activity of insulin (with F. P. Knowlton), and renal function (with E. B. Verney). In 1923–24 the American embryologist, George Washington Corner worked with Starling in his laboratory. In 1920, Starling was found to have colonic cancer, and the surgeon Arbuthnot Lane removed half of his colon. It seriously limited his exceptional physical activities: he gave up mountaineering, for example.

== The Nobel Committee ==
Starling's relationship with the Nobel Prize is of interest. He was first proposed for the prize in 1913 by Otto Loewi (who won a Prize himself in 1936). Starling's subject was hormones, with secretin being prominent. The assessor, J. E. Johansson, decided that Starling should receive the prize, but not yet. No prize was given during World War I. In 1920 August Krogh, a Danish physiologist was rewarded for his work on capillaries (his findings were not actually as significant as Starling's had been, twenty years before: but the significance of 'Starling forces' in the capillary had not become apparent).

In 1926, Starling was proposed again, this time for his work on the kidney. On this occasion, Johansson felt that Starling's hormone studies should have been rewarded. But by then the experiments had been done almost a quarter of a century before, and Johansson felt that the prize should be given for recent discoveries. He had forgotten that it was he who had put Starling's work on the back burner in 1913. Subsequent British Laureates (such as Gowland Hopkins and Charles Sherrington) were given the prize for work they had done twenty or thirty years before. But by this time Johansson was no longer involved with the awarding of the prize.

== Death ==
The exact circumstances of Starling's death are far from clear. He was on a pleasure cruise in the West Indies, but when his ship, the Elders & Fyffes banana boat Ariguani, tied up in Kingston harbour he was found to be dead. He was apparently travelling by himself, and there were no friends or relations at his funeral—in pouring rain—in Kingston, Jamaica. No autopsy was performed, so the cause of his death— which one may presume to be cancer secondary to his colon tumour—was never established.

His death marked the end of an outstanding contributor to medical science. In the words of Henry Dale, "All had found him a generous comrade and leader, and it is impossible to think of physiology in the last thirty years without Starling as the central figure of inspiration … his courage was indomitable, his energy and his passion for knowledge flouted all restraint."

== Descendants ==
Two of his great-grandchildren, Boris Starling (born 1969) and Belinda Starling (1972–2006) are writers.

His daughter Muriel (born c1893), married Sydney Patterson at St. Mary's Kilburn, London in 1919.
