= Joe Cain (historian of science) =

British historian of science

Joe Cain (born 23 April 1964) is a historian of science who specialises in the history of evolutionary biology. He is currently Professor of History and Philosophy of Biology at University College London (since 1996), and from 2011 to 2019 he was Head of Department of UCL's Department of Science and Technology Studies. He was also editor of BSHS Monographs, a series published by the British Society for the History of Science.

Cain has written extensively on the "synthesis period" of evolutionary studies, commonly referred to as the "modern synthesis" or the "evolutionary synthesis", of the 1930s and 1940s. His main work has emphasised the community infrastructure associated with US researchers in the subject. This infrastructure includes the Society for the Study of Evolution and the journal Evolution. His biographical writing focuses on George Gaylord Simpson, Ernst Mayr and Julian Huxley. His discussion of the relationship between Stephen Jay Gould and George Gaylord Simpson introduced the concept of "patricide" and "ritual patricide" to describe how one generation of scientists work to marginalise a predecessor.

Cain received the 2012 UCL Public Engagement Unit's award for the head of department who has shown the strongest commitment to culture change in their area of responsibility with respect to public engagement and the 2007 Joseph H. Hazen Education Prize from the History of Science Society. The same year he won the British Society for the History of Science OEC Image Prize for his photograph 'Connecting threads' and accompanying commentary.

From 2003 to 2007, Cain was a member of the Council for the International Society for the History, Philosophy, and Social Studies of Biology.

== Selected works ==
- 2013, The Brown Dog in Battersea Park, Euston Grove Press.
- (ed.) 2007, Regular Contact With Anyone Interested. Documents of the Society for the Study of Speciation, London: Euston Grove Press, second edition. ISBN 978-1-906267-00-1.
- with Sharon Messenger (eds.), 2009. Charles Darwin's The Expression of the Emotions in Man and Animals, London: Penguin Classics. ISBN 978-0-14-143944-0.
- with Michael Ruse (eds.), 2009. "Descended from Darwin: Insights into the History of Evolutionary Studies, 1900-1970", Philadelphia, PA: American Philosophical Society. Transactions of the American Philosophical Society, volume 99, part 1.
- (ed.) 2004, "Exploring the borderlands: documents of the Committee on Common Problems of Genetics, Paleontology, and Systematics, 1943-1944", Transactions of the American Philosophical Society, 94: xlii + 160.
