= Joe Kane =

American journalist and author (born 1953)

- Born: Joseph A. Kane; 1953 (age 72–73)
- Occupations: Journalist; author

Joseph A. Kane (born 1953) is an American author and journalist who writes for publications such as The New Yorker, National Geographic, and Esquire.

Kane's book, Running the Amazon (1989) is a first-hand account of the only expedition ever to travel the entire 4,200-mile (6,800 km) Amazon River from its source in Peru to the Atlantic Ocean, which took place between August 1985 and February 1986. The book is listed on Outside magazine's 25 (Essential) Books for the Well-Read Explorer and National Geographic Adventure's 100 Greatest Adventure Books of All Time.

In 1991, Kane traveled to Ecuador to learn about the indigenous Huaorani people and their struggles with international oil companies who were exploiting the Amazon with poor environmental practices such as setting off explosive charges, building new roads and oil rigs, and causing oil spills. Based on his experiences there, he wrote Savages (published 1995).

In 2007, he received a Poynter Fellowship in Journalism from Yale University.

Kane is married to Elyse and has two children. They live in Olympia, Washington.

== Publications ==
- Running the Amazon. Vintage. 1989. ISBN 0-679-72902-X. – Vintage paperback re-print 1990, includes a brief afterword that provides updates on the lives of those in the book.
- Savages. Vintage. 1995. ISBN 0-679-41191-7.
