= The Prophet (book) =

1923 book containing 26 prose poetry fables by Kahlil Gibran

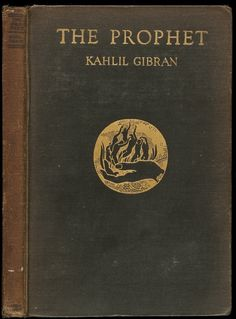
- First edition cover
- Author: Kahlil Gibran
- Cover artist: Kahlil Gibran
- Language: English
- Subject: Life and the human condition
- Genre: Prose poetry
- Publisher: Alfred A. Knopf
- Publication date: 1923
- Publication place: United States
- Media type: Book
- Pages: 107
- OCLC: 1744006
- Dewey Decimal: 811.19
- Followed by: The Garden of the Prophet
- Text: The Prophet at Wikisource

The Prophet is a book of 26 prose poetry fables written in English by the Lebanese-American poet and writer Kahlil Gibran. It was originally published in 1923 by Alfred A. Knopf. It is Gibran's best-known work. The Kahlil Gibran Collective says that The Prophet has been translated into over 100 languages, and is one of the best selling books of all time. By the 2010s, it had surpassed 10 million copies sold in its American edition alone. It has never been out of print.

== Synopsis ==
The prophet Almustafa, having lived in the city of Orphalese for 12 years, finally sees the ship that will carry him home arrive in the harbour. The people of Orphalese, seeing that the prophet is about to leave, call to Almustafa, begging him to stay, and follow him to the great square before the temple. The seeress Almitra, the first person in the city to believe in Almustafa, comes out of the temple and asks him to speak to the gathered crowd before leaving. The rest of the book, apart from the final chapter, consists of Almustafa's speeches to the crowd on a number of themes relating to life and the human condition.

The people ask the prophet to speak, in turn, of love, marriage, children, giving, eating and drinking, work, joy and sorrow, houses, clothes, buying and selling, crime and punishment, laws, freedom, reason and passion, pain, self-knowledge, teaching, friendship, talking, time, good and evil, prayer, pleasure, beauty, religion, and death.

After speaking on all of these topics, Almustafa says a final farewell to the people of Orphalese, and departs on the ship.

== Popularity ==
The Prophet has been translated into more than 100 languages. By 2012, it had sold more than nine million copies in its American edition alone since its original publication in 1923.

Of an ambitious first printing of 2,000 in 1923, Knopf sold 1,159 copies. The demand for The Prophet doubled the following year—and doubled again the year after that. It was translated into French by Madeline Mason-Manheim in 1926. By the time of Gibran's death in 1931, it had also been translated into German. Annual sales reached 12,000 in 1935, 111,000 in 1961 and 240,000 in 1965. The book sold its one millionth copy in 1957. At one point, The Prophet sold more than 5,000 copies a week worldwide.

=== Inspiration ===
Born a Maronite Christian, Gibran was influenced not only by his own religion but also by the Bahá’í Faith, Islam, and the mysticism of the Sufis. His knowledge of Lebanon's bloody history, with its destructive factional struggles, strengthened his belief in the fundamental unity of religions, something which his parents exemplified by welcoming people of various religions in their home. Connections and parallels have also been made to William Blake's work, as well as the theological ideas of Walt Whitman and Ralph Waldo Emerson such as reincarnation and the Over-soul. Themes of influence in his work were Arabic art, European Classicism (particularly Leonardo da Vinci) and Romanticism (Blake and Auguste Rodin), the Pre-Raphaelite Brotherhood, and more modern symbolism and surrealism.

Gibran’s strong connections to the Baháʼí faith started around 1912. One of Gibran's acquaintances, Juliet Thompson, recalled that he met 'Abdu'l-Bahá when that Bahai leader journeyed to the West. Gibran, who had arranged to draw his portrait, was unable to sleep the night before meeting him. Gibran later told Thompson that in 'Abdu'l-Bahá he had "seen the Unseen, and been filled." Gibran began work on The Prophet in 1912, when "he got the first motif, for his Island God," whose "Promethean exile shall be an Island one" rather than a mountain one. In 1928, at the screening of a film about `Abdu'l-Bahá, Gibran proclaimed in tears the exalted station the leader held, and left the event weeping still.

== Royalties and copyright control ==
Gibran instructed that, on his death, the royalties and copyrights to his materials be owned by his hometown, Bsharri, Lebanon. The Gibran National Committee (GNC) in Bsharri manages the Gibran Museum. Founded in 1935, the GNC is a non-profit corporation with exclusive rights to manage Gibran's copyright in his literary and artistic works.

== The Garden of the Prophet ==
Gibran followed The Prophet with The Garden of the Prophet, which was published posthumously in 1933. It narrates Al Mustafa's discussions with nine disciples following Al Mustafa's return after an intervening absence. It also included the poem "Pity the Nation", written some 20 years earlier.

== Adaptations ==
- 1973: The Profit; Albran's Serial, a parody published in 1973 by Price/Stern/Sloan, California, as written by the fictional Kehlog Albran (pseudonym for authors Martin A. Cohen and Sheldon Shacket). It reached its fourth printing in 1981.
- 1974: The Prophet by Khalil Gibran: A Musical Interpretation featuring Richard Harris. Music composed by Arif Mardin, Atlantic Records
- 1985: The Prophet was adapted into an unabridged audiobook, narrated by Paul Sparer. It was reissued in 2006.
- 2009: The Prophet: Music Inspired by the Poetry of Khalil Gibran, an album by Australian oud virtuoso Joseph Tawadros, winner of Limelight Award for Best World Music Achievement 2010, nominated for an Australian Recording Industry Award (ARIA) for Best World Music Album 2010.
- 2010: The Propheteer, a book of political satire reimagining The Prophet as George W. Bush lecturing his cronies on the White House lawn while waiting for his chopper bound for Texas. ISBN 978-1-4502-6057-2.
- 2014: Kahlil Gibran's The Prophet, an animated feature film version of the book, with Salma Hayek as producer and as the voice of the character Karima. Each chapter had an individual director, with The Lion King's Roger Allers overseeing the project.

== See also ==
- Translations of The Prophet

== Bibliography ==
- 1973. The Prophet by Kahlil Gibran; published by Alfred A Knopf, Inc.; a Borzoi (hardcover) book, ASIN: B004S0ZKJO.
