= Translations of The Prophet =

The Prophet, originally written in English by Kahlil Gibran and first published in the United States in 1923, has been translated into at least 117 verified languages as of 2026, making it one of the most translated single-author literary works in history.

Language	Title	Publisher	Translator(s)	Year
Acehnese				
Afrikaans	Die profeet	J.L. Van Schaik		
Albanian	Profeti			
Alsatian	De Prophet			
Amharic	YeTibeb Meniged (Nebiyu)			
Arabic (Egypt)	al-Nabī			
Arabic (England)	al-Nabī			
Arabic (Lebanon)	النبي (al-Nabī)		Mikha'il Na'ima	
Armenian (Eastern)	Margarēn	Lebanese Embassy of Armenia		
Armenian (Western)	Markarēn	Technopresse Moderne, Beirut, Lebanon	Vahe Vahian	1984
Assamese	Propheta			
Azerbaijani	Peyğəmbər	Qanun		
Basque	Profeta			
Bengali	The Prophet			
Berber	Amusnaw			
Bikol	An Profeta			
Breton	Ar Profed	Evertype	Alan Dipode	
Bulgarian	Prorokŭt			
Catalan	El profeta			
Cebuano	Ang Propeta			
Cornish	An Profet	Evertype	Ian Jackson	2021
Croatian	Prorok		Marko Grčić	1977
Czech	Prorok			
Danish	Profeten			
Dutch (Belgium)	De profeet	De Nederlandsche Boekhandel		
Dutch (Netherlands)	De profeet			
English Braille	The Prophet			
Esperanto	La Profeto			
Estonian	Prohvet			
Faroese	Profeturin			
Filipino	Ang Propeta			
Finnish	Profeetta		Annikki Setälä Risto Ahti; Jussi Korhonen	1972; 2006; 2019
French - Multilanguage (Andorra)	Le Prophète			
French (Belgium)	Le Prophète			
French (Canada)	Le prophète			
French (France)	Le Prophète	Le Sagittaire	Madeline Mason-Manheim	1926
French (Switzerland)	Le prophète			
German (Austria)	Der Prophet	Buchgemeinschaft Donauland		
German (Germany)	Der Prophet	Hyperion		
German (Switzerland)	Der Prophet	Walter		
Greek	Ο Προφήτης (O Profetes)			
Gujarati	Viday Velakhe			
Hebrew	הנביא (ha-Navi)			
Hindi	Paigambar			
Hungarian	A próféta			
Icelandic	Spámaðurinn			
Irish (Gaelic)	An Fáidh	Evertype	Gabriel Rosenstock	2021
Ido	Ila Profeto	Editerio Sudo	Partaka	2023
		Indonesian	An Nabi	
Italian	Il profeta			
Japanese	預言者 (Yogensha)	至光社 Shiko-sha	佐久間 彪 Takeshi Sakuma	1984
Kabyle	Nnbi			
Kannada	Pravādi			
Korean	예언자 (YeYeonJa)			
Kotava	Katcilik			
Kurdish	Peyamber			
Latvian	Pravietis			
Lithuanian	Pranašas			
Lombard	El Profeta			
Macedonian	Prorokot			
Malay	Sang Nabi			
Malayalam	Pravācakan			
Maltese	Il-profeta			
Marathi	da prophet (Paigambar)			
Nepali	Guru			
Northern Sotho	Moprofeta			
Norwegian	Profeten			
Norwegian (Bokmål)	Profeten			
Norwegian (Nynorsk)	Profeten			
Occitan	Alora una frema…			
Papiamento	E Profeta	University Press of Maryland		
Pashto	Haghạh wuwel (He said)			
Persian	Payāmbar			
Polish	Prorok			
Portuguese (Brazil)	O Profeta	Biblioteca Universal Popular		
Portuguese (Portugal)	O profeta			
Punjabi	Paighambar			
Romani	A próféta / O platniko (in Vesho műfordítások)			
Romanian	Profetul			
Russian	Пророк (Prorok)	Raduga Publishers	Igor Zotikov	1989
Serbian	Prorok			
Sotho (Southern Sotho)	Moprofeta			
Tswana	Moporofeti			
Sinhala	Divasiya			
Slovak	Prorok			
Slovenian	Prerok		Lojze Bratina	1978
Spanish (Argentina)	El Profeta	L.J. Rosso		
Spanish (Chile)	El profeta			
Spanish (Colombia)	El profeta			
Spanish (Mexico)	El Profeta	Imprenta Mundial		
Spanish (Peru)	El profeta	Tall. Gráf. P.L. Villanueva		
Spanish (Spain)	El profeta			
Spanish (Uruguay)	El profeta			
Swahili	Mtume	Tanzania Pub. House		
Swedish	Profeten			
Syriac (Iraq)	Enwīyā			
Syriac (Sweden)	Nbíyā	Ashurbanibal Bok-förlag		
Tagalog	Ang pantas	C & E Publishing		
Tamil	Tīrkkatarici			
Telugu	Jeevana Geetha	Yuva Bharati	Kaloji Narayana Rao	
Thai	Pratchayā chīwit			
Tigrinya	እቲ ነቢይ (Eti Nebiy)		Mesfin Desta Gebremedhin	2015
Turkish	Ermiş	İş Bankası Kültür Yayınları	Ayşe Berktay	2014
Ukrainian	Prorok			
Urdu	Paigham-bar			
Uyghur	Danishmăn: năsriy sheirlar			
Vietnamese	Mật khải			
Xhosa	Umprofethi			
Tsonga	Muprofeta			
Yiddish	Der Novi	Yatshkovski's Biblyotek		
Zulu	Umpholofithi			
