= Baháʼí Faith in Egypt =

The Baháʼí Faith in Egypt has existed for over 150 years. The first followers of the Baháʼí Faith arrived in Egypt in 1863. Baháʼu'lláh, founder of the religion, was himself briefly in Egypt in 1868 when on his way to imprisonment in ʻAkká. The first Egyptians were converts by 1896. Despite forming an early Baháʼí Local Spiritual Assembly and forming a National Assembly, in 1960 following a regime change the Baháʼís lost all rights as an organised religious community by Decree 263 at the decree of then-President Gamal Abdel Nasser. However, in 1963, there were still seven organized communities in Egypt. More recently the roughly 2000 or 7000 by ARDA Baháʼís of Egypt have been embroiled in the Egyptian identification card controversy from 2006 through 2009. There have been homes burned down and families driven out of towns.

According to the statement of the director of the office of External Affairs of the NSA of the Baháʼís of the United States, the Baháʼí community of Egypt has diminished by 90 percent to 500 people.

== Early history ==
One of the early Baháʼí pioneers to come to Egypt in 1867 was Mirza Heyder Ali during the reign of Ismaʻil Pasha; Ali was arrested and banished to Sudan for 12 years soon after his entrance into Egypt. Other early Baháʼís in Egypt were Haji Báqir-i-Káshání and Siyyid Husayin-i-Káshání who took up residence in Egypt during the period Baháʼu'lláh was in Adrianople. Another early Baháʼí was Hag Hassan Khurásáni who held weekly meetings in his home. Baháʼu'lláh and his family left Adrianople on 12 August 1868 and after a journey by land and sea through Gallipoli and Egypt arrived in ʻAkká on 31 August, and confined in the barracks in the citadel in the city. From then on many well known Baháʼís spent time in Egypt or joined the religion there. Nabíl-i-Aʻzam made several journeys on behalf of Baháʼu'lláh and was imprisoned in Egypt in 1868. Robert Felkin was in Egypt circa 1880s and published a number of books -later he converted to the religion. In 1892 two converts in Egypt embarked to the West intending to spread the religion and were the first Baháʼís to enter the United States where the first converts followed in 1894.

=== Mírzá Abu'l-Faḍl-i-Gulpáygání ===
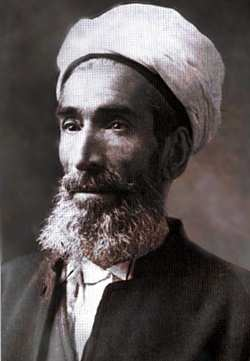
Mírzá Abu'l-Faḍl-i-Gulpáygání

Mírzá Abu'l-Faḍl-i-Gulpáygání, often called Mírzá Abu'l-Faḍl, was one of the prominent Baháʼís to pioneer to Egypt and made some of the first big changes to the community. Abu'l-Faḍl first came to Cairo in 1894 where he settled for several years. He worked at Al-Azhar University and was successful in converting more than fourteen and up to thirty of the teachers and students including the first native Egyptians to convert to the religion. Abu'l-Faḍl also became friends with writers and magazine publishers, and many articles that he authored appeared in the Egyptian press. In 1896, when Nasiru'd-Din Shah was assassinated in Iran, Zaʻimu'd-Dawlih used the rumour that the assassination had been performed by Baháʼís to cause a massacre of the Baháʼís in Egypt. Abu'l-Faḍl stood up in defence for the Baháʼís and stated that he himself was a Baháʼí and his allegiance became public. Two publications came out during this time from Mírzá Abu'l-Faḍl:

- Fara'id (The Peerless Gems): A book written in 1898 in reply to an attack on the Kitáb-i-Íqán and published in Cairo. Generally considered Mírzá Abu'l-Faḍl's greatest work.
- Al-Duraru'l-Bahiyyih (The Shining Pearls): Published in 1900, it is a collection of essays on the history of the Baháʼí Faith. Since it was wrriten in Arabic, it was responsible for making the Baháʼís known in Egypt.

Following their publication al-Azhar University decreed that he was an infidel. From 1901 to 1904 at the request of ʻAbdu'l-Bahá he traveled and gave talks among the new Baháʼí community in the United States. Meanwhile, the Egyptian community continued to publish materials and from 1900 to 1910 several articles and books including official Baháʼí literature were published in Cairo. Abu'l-Faḍl died in 1914 is buried in the cemetery called Al-Rawda Al-Abadeyya, the Eternal Garden.

=== ʻAbdu'l-Bahá ===
Circa 1887 ʻAbdu'l-Bahá met the Egyptian reformer Muhammad Abduh while both were in Lebanon wherein Abduh had a clearly positive impression of him.

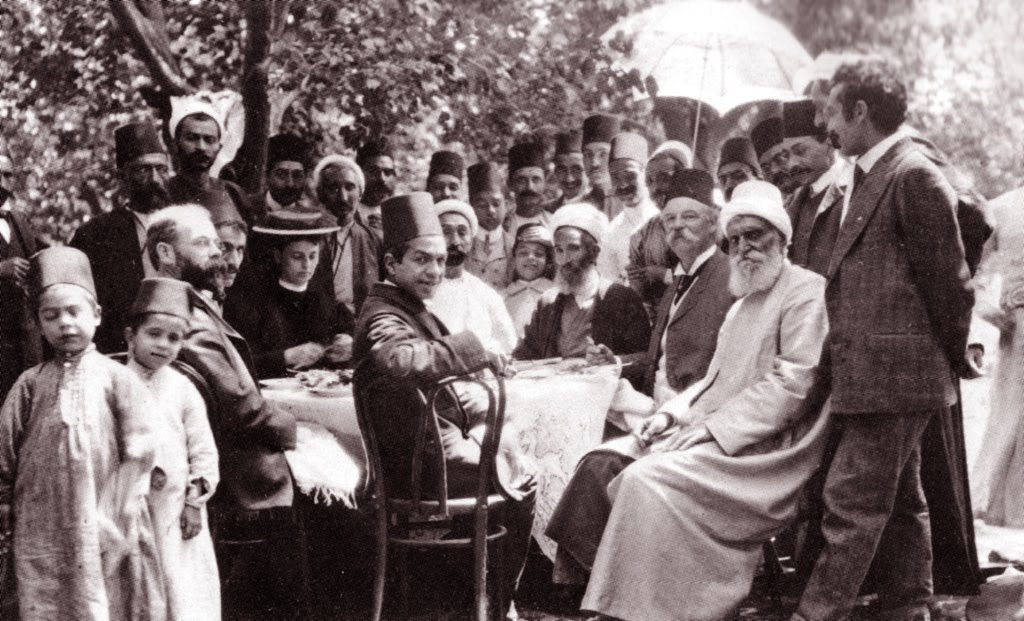
Thornton Chase (seated, second from right and Mírzá Abu'l-Faḍl next to him) among Baháʼís in Egypt.

After a further period of imprisonment westerners became interested in meeting him as well. Thornton Chase, the first Baháʼí of the West, came in 1907, and he wrote a book about it. ʻAbdu'l-Bahá, highly impressed by Chase's qualities, conferred on him the title thábit, "steadfast." Stanwood Cobb managed to meet ʻAbdu'l-Bahá, then head of the religion, after an accidental meeting with Lua Getsinger in 1908 in Egypt. ʻAbdu'l-Bahá traveled to Egypt in September 1910 after being released following events of the Young Turk Revolution. This was the initial event of a series of journeys he took. Sometime from late September to mid-August 1910 until the winter of 1913, ʻAbdu'l-Bahá would travel from Egypt to various countries and back in two successive trips – first to Europe, second to America (United States and Canada) and back to Europe on the return trip. Before, between, and on return he would stop in Egypt. See ʻAbdu'l-Bahá's journeys to the West. Wellesley Tudor Pole became a Baháʼí after traveling to Egypt to interview him in November 1910. In the same year, ʻAbdu'l-Bahá referred to an early Baháʼí Local Spiritual Assembly of Cairo. Playwright Isabella Grinevskaya traveled to meet ʻAbdu'l-Bahá in Egypt and became a member of the religion. Louis Gregory visited ʻAbdu'l-Bahá at Ramleh in 1911. ʻAbdu'l-Bahá was about to make long travels to the West. Just before ʻAbdu'l-Bahá's first trip, a message from Lady Blomfield extended an invitation for ʻAbdu'l-Bahá when he was in London. ʻAbdu'l-Bahá then set sail 11 August 1911, reached as far as London, and returned in early December to rest for the winter. His next trip was more extensive and reached to California. He left 25 March 1912 and returned 17 June 1913 and on return stayed in Egypt almost six months before returning to Haifa/Akka. Upon his return he gave a number of talks. These were eventually published as ʻAbdu'l-Bahá in Egypt. After ʻAbdu'l-Bahá returned to Haifa, Martha Root stayed there for six months in 1915. One of the earliest Baháʼís of the west and a Disciple of ʻAbdu'l-Bahá, Lua Getsinger, died in 1916 and she was buried in Egypt. And following ʻAbdu'l-Bahá laying the cornerstone for the first Baháʼí House of Worship of the West, the Baháʼís from Cairo, Port Said and Alexandria contributed to the Fund for its construction in Wilmette, Illinois. During World War I Baháʼís in Port Said were pillaged twice. Meanwhile, Tudor Pole was stationed in Egypt and was directly involved in addressing the concerns raised by Ottoman threats against ʻAbdu'l-Bahá. As the battle lines advanced from Egypt through Palestine, the Ottomans had threatened that ʻAbdu'l-Bahá would be killed if the Ottomans had been forced to leave the region. This threat was taken seriously by the British Military who then sought to make his protection part of the plans for the Palestine theatre. General Allenby altered his plans for the prosecution of the war and succeeded in protecting ʻAbdu'l-Bahá.

=== After the death of ʻAbdu'l-Bahá ===
In the period between the world wars, public opposition to Baháʼís became more widespread as the religion grew and in addition to growing, the Baháʼís of Egypt began to publish materials to be more easily read. At the death of ʻAbdul-Bahá in 1921, Shoghi Effendi left England with the assistance of Lady Blomfield and stopped in Egypt to change boats for Haifa.

==== Progress of the religion ====
The assembly of Alexandria was formed in 1924 for the first time and Subhê Eliçs was among the elected – he was re-elected until 1961 and left an oral history recorded from his experiences in the community in 1977. It was also the year of the first election of the regional National Spiritual Assembly of Egypt and Sudan. In 1928 the Bulletin was first published by the National Spiritual Assembly of the Baháʼís of Egypt, in English, Arabic and Persian. The national conventions continued to elect the national assembly. By 1930 most of the Egyptian Baháʼís were native Egyptians and despite circumstances an Egyptian Baháʼí woman was able to attend the 1931 Women's Conference of All-Asia held in Lahore, Burma. Marie of Edinburgh, another western Baháʼí, was able to stop at Egypt for a time but failed to make landfall in Haifa. In early 1934 Sabri Elias pioneered to what was then called Abyssinia, (see Baháʼí Faith in Ethiopia) where he was soon joined by further Egyptians by mid-1934 – enough to elect the first Assembly in Addis Ababa. In 1935 the national assembly saw to the translation of the Kitáb-i-Íqán into Arabic and its publication. The Baháʼís returned from Ethiopia when war was breaking out. Meanwhile, the publishing committee of Alexandria published the Tablet to The Hague in one of the local papers on the occasion of the question of peace. By early 1937 Mostafa Kamel of Egypt was able to act as a youth international correspondent for a youth newsletter.

==== Instances of opposition ====
1924 began with an apparent triumph when following a controversy over a burial of a Baháʼí in a Muslim cemetery, Egypt became the first Islamic state to legally recognize the Baháʼí Faith as an independent religion separate from Islam and creating two cemeteries for the Baháʼís – one in Cairo and the other in Ismaïlia. As a result of the decision when certain Muslims attacked Baháʼís in Kom El-Sayeda the perpetrators were excommunicated from Islam for the attack. In 1936 following interest from citizens of Belqas as well as visitors from Tanta it became known that Saad Effendi Salim Nosseir was a Baháʼí and opposition was stirred up such that the interested citizens and Nosseir were unable to leave their homes. Nossier, being a public servant, appealed for a change in residence and serve in another district and was at first refused despite his good reputation. However, in time he was transferred. And in late 1938 there were extraordinary events concerning the burial of Mohammed Effendi Soliman of Ismaïlia who had died 9 December 1938. Having informed family and friends of his wish for a Baháʼí funeral, and drawing up a Will requiring his heirs to submit to the Local Assembly of Ismaïlia, the assembly informed the police of the papers and arrangements. A non-Baháʼí brother agitated against this funeral and became so threatening that he was detained by the police. However, when it came time to take the casket to the cemetery a large angry crowd made travel impossible despite police protection. That night the casket was transferred to police headquarters though fighting injured eight policemen. On the next day after midnight a truck took the casket out of town to be buried in the desert sands. The home of the deceased was attacked by a mob, and demonstnitions were continued in the streets throughout the night. In 1939, after the national assembly elections, petition was made to have Baháʼí marriage ceremonies legal in Egypt – as part of the justification a copy of a marriage contract issued by the Spiritual Assembly of Haifa and legalized by both Palestine authorities and the Egyptian Consulate in Jerusalem was enclosed. However, by 1944 a Baháʼí marriage was compulsorily annulled because the wife had originally been Moslem, in spite of her statement in court that she now considered herself a Baháʼí. Sabri Elias married and went on Baháʼí pilgrimage and then returned to Ethiopia and then some years later went on to Djibouti. Shoghi Effendi came through Egypt during a personal trip with his wife Rúhíyyih Khanum through Africa in 1940.

== Up to the time of dissolution ==
Following permission being granted in 1941, the remains of Lua Getsinger were transferred in 1943 to be next to the transferred remains of Abu'l-Faḍl (she facing west, he east, at the direction of Shoghi Effendi) to the Baháʼí Cemetery in Cairo, that was ornamented by 1947. However opposition also continued to grow – though work on translation had begun in 1934, in 1942 Egyptian police confiscated Arabic translations of The Dawn-breakers. After many efforts by the National Assembly, the confiscated copies were released on condition that this book should not be distributed in Egypt or sent out of the country. The Censorship Bureau of the Egyptian Ministry of the Interior requested the Assembly to renew their guarantee every fifteen days that the said book will not be put in circulation. Also in 1942 Hand of the Cause Abdu'l-Jalil Bey Sa'd, a notable student of Abu'l-Faḍl, died and was buried with memorial services called for in the east and west.

=== Centenary observances ===
Despite the ongoing World War, some 200 Baháʼís, including from Egypt and other nearby areas, were able to gather for 3 days in May 1944 at the Shrine of the Báb to commemorate the centenary of the founding of the Baháʼí Faith. Inside Egypt some 500 Baháʼís were able to gather to mark the event at the national center. During the three days of events in Cairo, talks were presented on "The Position of Women in the Baháʼí Cause", "The life of Qurratu'l-ʻAyn" (see Táhirih), "The Accord between Religion and Science", "Why Baháʼís feel tranquility", and various quotes from Baháʼí literatures. By the end of 1944 there were four assemblies (Cairo, Alexandria, Port-Said, Ismaʻiliyyih) and an additional 16 smaller communities in Egypt, and the Baháʼí community in Egypt began to include Kurdish, Coptic, and Armenian peoples.

=== Further growth ===
By the end of the 1940s assemblies in Egypt had been extended into Suez, Tanta and Sohag. During this period of growth pioneers went beyond the Middle East to Scotland. A public lending library was established in Cairo to satisfy inquires being made but anti-Baháʼí pamphlets were published and posted in Tanta instigating violence and individuals in other cities were actually attacked. Opposition began to reach out from Egypt in the form of article in an Egyptian Daily newspaper circulated in the United States published a story subtitled "Necessity of a Moslem Cultural Center in America to Inform the Americans of the True Moslem Cult." And attacks in Tanta escalated to the point that a government official publicly addressed the summoned ringleaders saying "Your evil deeds have shown you to be far removed from the teachings of Islám for Islám is a religion of peace" and made them sign a statement of good behavior. In May 1948 Shoghi Effendi announced goals for the Egyptian Baháʼí community evolving increasing the number of assemblies, smaller groups of Baháʼís, and purchases of lands. A number of events and incidents brought the religion to the awareness of diverse audiences. There were formal representations from the Egyptian Baháʼí community to the government, invitations to Egyptian leaders and random incidents and in the public media. There were specific developments in the community in 1951. An assembly was established in El-Mahalla El-Kubra, and it was announced that the Egyptian Government had given recognition to Baháʼí marriages. At this time women were allowed to be and were elected according to the rules of Baháʼí administration to local assemblies in Cairo, Alexandria, and Port Said, (indeed some were elected officers in 1952.) Also publishing Baháʼí material resumed which had been curtailed for a time. And a wave of pioneers left Egypt in 1951 for North and Central Africa (see Baháʼí Faith in Uganda for a start.)

=== Regional Assembly ===
The Sudan/Egypt regional National Assembly existed until 1953 when it became a regional assembly for North East Africa. It included French Somaliland; Egypt, Sudan, Abyssinia, Libya, Eritrea, British Somaliland; Italian Somaliland; and Socotra Is. The Baháʼí summer school in Alexandria began having integrated classes with women and men in 1953 and a newsreel carrying the dedication of the Baháʼí Temple in Wilmette was shown in movie houses in Egypt. In 1955 two new assemblies in Egypt were elected – Damanhur and Shibin El Kom in 1956 in El Mansoura In 1959 the Baháʼís held their first winter school. At this time the Baháʼís may have reached 3000 in Egypt. Sabri Elias with his family returned from pioneering to Ethiopia and beyond back to Egypt in 1959. By the late 1950s, there were approximately 5,000 Egyptian Baháʼís and organized communities of Baháʼís in 13 cities.

=== Dissolution ===
However, since a regime change in 1960, the Baháʼís lost all rights as an organized religious community by Decree 263 which specified a minimum sentence of six months' imprisonment or a fine for any assembly-related activities. This law came into being seven years after the declaration of the Arab Republic of Egypt, at the decree of then-President Gamal Abdel Nasser. All Baháʼí community properties, including Baháʼí centers, libraries, and cemeteries, were confiscated by the government except the cemetery Al-Rawda Al-Abadeyya. In obedience to the government is a core principal of the religion. In 1963, Baháʼí communities were still counted in Abu Qir, Mansoura, Alexandria, Port Said, Cairo, Zeitoun, and Ismaïlia. The 1971 Egyptian constitution specified "the state shall guarantee the freedom of belief and the freedom of practice of religious rites" however the 1975 Egyptian Supreme Court upheld the legality of the law and ruled constitutional protections only extended to the three "heavenly" religions of Judaism, Christianity and Islam. From 1965 to 2001 there were 236 arrests of Bahaʼis, charged under Article 98(f) of the Penal Code which proscribes "disparaging contempt of any divinely-revealed religion or its adherents, or prejudicing national unity or social harmony". Albert-Ludwig University of Freiberg's Professor of Islamic Studies, Johanna Pink, has suggested the government was not so much concerned with the Baháʼís being a real threat, but was attempting to "legitimise" its authority in the eyes of the people, presenting themselves as "defenders" of Egypt as an Islamic state. There were episodic waves of arrests of Baháʼís in the mid-1960s, 1972 and 1985. In early 1987 48 Baháʼís had sentences pronounced against them for activities as Baháʼís. However two were found not guilty after they recanted their faith. Charges against the Baháʼís included gathering in small groups, praying together in private homes, and being in possession of Baháʼí holy writings and prayer books. Thirty-two of the Baháʼís were acquitted in one bunch and 13 in another by mid-1988.

== Modern community ==
Since its inception the religion has had involvement in socio-economic development beginning by giving greater freedom to women, promulgating the promotion of female education as a priority concern, and that involvement was given practical expression by creating schools, agricultural coops, and clinics. The religion entered a new phase of activity when a message of the Universal House of Justice dated 20 October 1983 was released. Baháʼís were urged to seek out ways, compatible with the Baháʼí teachings, in which they could become involved in the social and economic development of the communities in which they lived. Worldwide in 1979 there were 129 officially recognized Baháʼí socio-economic development projects. By 1987, the number of officially recognized development projects had increased to 1482. However in the early 2000s, the Egyptian Baháʼí community had fatwas issued against it by Al-Azhar's Islamic Research Center, which charged Baháʼís with apostasy in Islam. There are still allegations of Baháʼí involvement with other powers and accusations of "using religion to promote deviant ideas to spark sedition or disdain the heavenly religions or their followers or to harm national unity." There have been homes burned down and families driven out of their communities.

During and since the 2011 Egyptian revolution tensions have remained high – homes have been burnt though Baháʼís contributed to the dialog. Since 2011 Baháʼís while hopeful remain concerned and a Salafi spokesman has said of Baháʼís "We will prosecute the Bahai's (sic) on charge of treason." In the summer of 2012 Dwight Bashir, the Deputy Director for Policy and Research at the U.S. Commission on International Religious Freedom, called the Baháʼís in Egypt a "litmus test" as "a compelling indicator of the trajectory" Egyptian society was turning following the 2011 Egyptian revolution and outlined a number of myths about the religion showing examples of these myths being repeated in Egypt.

In late 2012 Dr. Ibrahim Ghoniem, acting Minister of Education and member of the Muslim Brotherhood stated his opinion the Baháʼí children would be excluded from the Egyptian school system. Related comments also put in doubt the status of the Identification Controversy. According to news coverage, in December 2014 a government ministry organized a workshop for Muslim imams held in ʻAbbassia's Al-Nour Mosque to "raise awareness" of the "growing dangers of the spread of Bahaʼism," to maintain "national security and stability" as Bahaʼi thought allegedly "threatens Islam specifically and Egyptian society in general," and "teach young imams how to respond to Baháʼí thoughts and arguments." Minister Mohamed Mokhtar Goma of the Ministry of Religious Endowments continue to portray the Baháʼís as a threat to society in April 2015. Even listing the religion on purely administrative paperwork was considered a "threat to public order" in recent developments.

=== Somaya Ramadan ===
Somaya Ramadan is an Egyptian academic, translator and award-winning writer. She was born in Cairo in 1951 and studied English at Cairo University. Subsequently she obtained a PhD in English from Trinity College, Dublin in 1983. She is a convert from Islam to the Baháʼí Faith.

Ramadan's first two books were short story collections - Khashab wa Nohass (Brass and Wood, 1995) and Manazel el-Kamar (Phases of the Moon, 1999). Her first novel Awraq Al-Nargis (Leaves of Narcissus) was published to great acclaim in 2001 and won the Naguib Mahfouz Medal. It was then translated into English by Marilyn Booth and is available from the AUC Press.

Ramadan has also worked extensively as a translator. Among her notable translations is Virginia Woolf's A Room of One's Own. She is a founding member of the Women and Memory Forum, a non-profit organisation, and teaches English and Translation at the National Academy of Arts in Cairo.

=== Hussein Bikar ===
Hussein Bikar was born in Alexandria in 1912 and was one of the most famous Egyptian portrait painters. A member of the Baháʼí Faith he was arrested in the 1980s by the state security investigation bureau in a clamp-down on Baháʼís in Egypt. Nevertheless, Bikar received the State Merit Award in 1978, the Merit Medal in 1980 and, in 2000, shortly before his death, the Mubarak Award. The Universal House of Justice, the highest governing body of the Baháʼí Faith, paid tribute to his contributions to Egyptian society after his death in 2002.

=== Identification Controversy ===
The controversy resulted from a ruling of the Supreme Administrative Council of Egypt on 16 December 2006 against the Baháʼís stating that the government may not recognize the Baháʼí Faith in official identification cards.

The ruling left Baháʼís unable to obtain the necessary government documents to have rights in their country unless they lied about their religion, which conflicts with Baháʼí religious principle. However a 2008 ruling accepted the compromise solution offered by the Baháʼís, allowing for them to obtain identification papers without the Baháʼí Faith being officially recognized, however through February 2009 there have been appeals and procedural choices made trying not to give such cards. The first identification cards were issued to two Baháʼís, though, under the new policy on 8 August 2009.

=== Demographics ===
Estimates in 2022 placed the number of Baha'i people at between 1,000 and 2,000 people. The Association of Religion Data Archives (relying on the World Religion Database) showed that they made up less than 0.01% of the country's population. Baháʼís in the US (published in 2006) stated that the community of Egypt had diminished by 90 percent to 500 people.

== See also ==
- Religion in Egypt
  - Freedom of religion in Egypt
- History of Egypt
