= Conrath =

Conrath is a surname. Notable people with the surname include:

- Jean-Marie Conrath (born 1952), French Olympic long-distance runner
- Matthew Conrath (born 1989), American football defensive end
- Paul Conrath (1896–1979), German general during World War II
- Theodore Conrath (1920–1995), American painter, sculptor, and teacher
- Walter J. Conrath (1907–1942), American philatelist

== See also ==
- Conrath, Wisconsin, village in Rusk County
- Rudolf Bernhard Conrath (1901–1962), Swiss comedian, radio personality, and stage and film actor
