= Paris Talks =

Paris Talks is a book transcribed from talks given by ʻAbdu'l-Bahá while in Paris in the first stages of his journeys to the West. It was originally published as Talks by ʻAbdu'l-Bahá Given in Paris in 1912. ʻAbdu'l-Bahá did not read and authenticate the transcripts of his talks in Paris, and thus the authenticity of the talks is not known. Shoghi Effendi, head of the Baháʼí Faith in the first half of the 20th century, has said that, while the texts are not authenticated, the compilations can still be used by Baháʼís and in the future work will be done to find which parts are authentic.

Lady Blomfield's copious notes are the basis of the volume.

== See also ==
- ʻAbdu'l-Bahá's journeys to the West
