= Baháʼí Faith in Ethiopia =

The Baháʼí Faith in Ethiopia began after ʻAbdu'l-Bahá wrote letters encouraging taking the religion to Africa in 1916. Probably the first Baháʼí to settle in the country came in early 1934 and with further pioneers by mid-1934, the first Baháʼí Local Spiritual Assembly of the country was elected in November in Addis Ababa. In 1962, Ethiopia Baháʼís had elected a National Spiritual Assembly. By 1963 there were seven localities with smaller groups of Baháʼís in the country. The Association of Religion Data Archives estimated some 27000 Baháʼís in 2005. The community celebrated its diamond jubilee in January 2009.

== Beginnings ==
=== ʻAbdu'l-Bahá's Tablets of the Divine Plan ===
ʻAbdu'l-Bahá wrote a series of letters, or tablets, to the followers of the religion in the United States and Canada in 1916-1917; these letters were compiled together in the book Tablets of the Divine Plan. The eighth and twelfth of the tablets mentioned Africa and were written on April 19, 1916 and February 15, 1917, respectively. Publication however was delayed in the United States until 1919—after the end of the First World War and the Spanish flu. The tablets were translated and presented by Mirza Ahmad Sohrab on April 4, 1919, and published in Star of the West magazine on December 12, 1919. ʻAbdu'l-Bahá mentions Baháʼís traveling "…especially from America to Europe, Africa, Asia and Australia, and travel through Japan and China. Likewise, from Germany teachers and believers may travel to the continents of America, Africa, Japan and China; in brief, they may travel through all the continents and islands of the globe" and " …the anthem of the oneness of the world of humanity may confer a new life upon all the children of men, and the tabernacle of universal peace be pitched on the apex of America; thus Europe and Africa may become vivified with the breaths of the Holy Spirit, this world may become another world, the body politic may attain to a new exhilaration…."

=== Establishment of the community ===
Early pioneers from Egypt gathered in Addis Ababa (see Baháʼí Faith in Egypt.) The first to arrive was Sabri Elias in early 1934 who thus earned the title Knight of Baháʼu'lláh. By mid-1934 he was joined by families of Baháʼís and in late 1934 they elected the first Baháʼí Local Spiritual Assembly. Its members were: Atto Sium Gabril, Atto Haila Gabril, Habib Boutros, Sabri Elias, Edouard Goubran, El-Saad Said, El-Saad Mansour, Abdu'llahi Ahmed, and Aurahil Egsabaihir. Sabri Elias traveled back and forth from Alexandria devoted to the work of translating and printing various materials including Baháʼu'lláh and the New Era in Amharic though he had to leave in 1935 and was able to return next in 1944 (having taken the opportunity to get married and undertake pilgrimage) due to the Second Italo-Abyssinian War. The members of the community had left and the assembly was next elected in 1945. In 1947 Ugo Giachery rendered some assistance translating materials for the community to use. In early 1951 the Ethiopian community sent its first pioneer beyond Addis Ababa. Followed by Mr. and Mrs. Elias who left for Djibouti in 1954. At the same time across the regional unit of Egypt and Abyssinia women were allowed to be and were elected according to the rules of Baháʼí administration to be members of assemblies including in Addis Ababa - members were: Mr G.M. Bahta Mrs Gila, Dr V. Kies, Sabri Elias, Mrs Sabri, Mr Alfred Shafi, Mr Birch, Sayed Mansour, and David A. Talbot. In 1952 some were elected officers - the members were Gila M. Bahta, David Talbot, Dr. V. Ries, Sabri Elias, Mrs. Gila (treasurer) Mrs. Elias Alfred Shafi, Mr. Birch Sayed Mansour.

== Growth ==
Cities of Ethiopia with Baháʼís by the end of 1963

The Baháʼí Community in Ethiopia came under the responsibility of the regional National Spiritual Assembly of Egypt and Sudan during the Ten Year Crusade in 1953. This was during a period of wide scale growth in the religion across Sub-Saharan Africa near the end of the period of Colonisation of Africa. Pioneers continued to arrive like Fred Schechter in 1954 and Dr. Amín'u'lláh Misbáh who lived there from 1955–1959. Baháʼí Holy days and Baháʼí Marriage certificates were recognized in Addis Ababa, and the assembly obtained legal incorporation in 1955–56. The community subsequently became part of the regional National Assembly of North-East Africa in 1956. A summer school in 1958 was held in Eritrea, then part of Ethiopia, hosting a significant expansion of the effort which included Baháʼís from several cities: Addis Ababa, Gondar, Adiqualla, Massawa, Agordat, Barentu, and Asmara. The program included a variety of subjects: "Baha'i Administration" by Charles Hassan of Addis Ababa, "Baha'i History" by Dr. Hushang Ahdieh of Asmara, "Islam" by Mrs. Jeanne Mesbah of Asmara, "The Laws and Ordinances of Baha'u'llah" by Dr. Farhoumand, and "Meditatinn" by Dr. Walter Niederreiter. The Baháʼís were allowed to send official observers to the first session of the Economic Commission for Africa of the United Nations held in Addis Ababa in late 1958: Gila Bahta and Charles Hassan of Addis Ababa, and Ali Nakhjavani of Kampala. They succeeded in meeting and discussing the religion with representatives to the Commission and discussing a variety of issues including the Persecution of Baháʼís in Iran. The first Baháʼí summer school in Addis Ababa was held in May 1959 and included an observance of the 12th Day of Ridván. The average attendance during the school sessions was twenty-five, and included many Baháʼís of Addis Ababa and their non-Baháʼí friends. In 1960 a group of sixty-five, half of them guests of the Baha'is shown considerable interest in an introductory talk on the religion in Addis Ababa in the Amharic language. In 1961 events began to multiply - members of the religion reached the towns of Volisso, Bedele and Shashamane, participated in the dedication of the Baháʼí House of Worship in Uganda. and the assembly of Addis Ababa oversaw the first Baháʼí marriage. Hand of the Cause Enoch Olinga travelled extensively in East Africa in 1962 including Ethiopia by which time Ethiopia Baháʼís had elected a National Spiritual Assembly. The same year a Baháʼí Ethiopian student studying in Germany was elected president of the non-partisan Ethiopian Student Union. By 1963 in addition to the assembly in Addis Ababa there were seven communities with smaller groups of Baháʼís in Adua, Alemaya, Debre Zeyit, Dessie, Dire Dawa, Gondar & Jimma and twelve isolated members in other communities. And also in 1963 in a step of recognition of the religion the city government of Addis Ababa allocated land for use as a Baháʼí burial ground.

=== Regional organization ===
The Sudan/Egypt regional National Assembly existed until 1953 when it became a regional assembly for North East Africa. This included French Somaliland; Egypt, Sudan, Abyssinia, Libya, Eritrea, British Somaliland; Italian Somaliland; and Socotra Is. The regional assembly was again re-organized when the institutions of the religion were made illegal in Egypt in 1960 and again when Sudan, Somalia and Ethiopia formed their own regional assembly in 1968 with members: Gila Michael Bahta, Dr. Leo Neiderreitter, Gamal Rushdy, Asfaw Tessema, Dr. Heshmat Farhoumand, Dr. Hushang Ahdieh, Ursula Samandari, Assefaw Habte Michael and Rabbi Teele Mariam. From 1968 into 69 there were a number of initiatives undertaken including reaching to outlying areas, international speakers and a winter school.

==== Visit of Hand of the Cause Rúhíyyih Khanum ====
From 1969 to 1973 Hand of the Cause Rúhíyyih Khanum travelled through many countries including Ethiopia. She arrived in Ethiopia October 15 and spent a month touring the Baháʼí communities with coverage by print and, for the first time in Ethiopia radio, news outlets on her arrival. She was received by Haile Selassie I of Ethiopia the same day. In the half-hour interview she communicated how she had long admired him because of the way he had conducted himself in the face of the many trials and hardships of his life, and by the way he had overcome them. Selassie gave her a gold medal from his Coronation. In the days afterwards she was escorted by civic authorities to Genet where a regional conference was held, in part to celebrate the Baháʼí holy day of the Birth of the Báb, and dedicated the Banáni Teaching Institute. Villagers surprised the guests with a dance they had not shared previously and sung Baháʼí songs with English words - a language foreign to them - with clarity enough to be understood. At a stop in another village a couple local Muslim leaders converted to the religion in her presence. On return to Addis Ababa Rúhíyyih Khanum and some Ethiopian Baháʼís were received by Princess Tenagnework Worke Haile Selassie and her daughter Princess Seble Desta. The following day the Baháʼí community sponsored an observance of United Nations Day with a public lecture by a member of the United Nations Secretariat stationed in Ethiopia, prefaced by remarks by Rúhíyyih Khanum who was able to first present the Baháʼí attitude toward, and relationship with, the United Nations. The following day she flew to the Province of Harrari where she was received by the provincial governor, though she fell ill and a member of the national assembly flew her to Assab to recoup. Then in Eritrea she addressed audiences of government servants, school principals and teachers, and a women's organization on topics of science and religion, the place of a religious morality and the civilizing role of women, often with questions from the audiences often late into the night. Later, in discussion with Prince Asrate Medhin Kassa it became known that while in exhile some years earlier he had borrowed and read a copy of Baháʼu'lláh and the New Era in Amharic that had been given to the Emperor. Rúhíyyih Khanum then toured ancient sites of Ethiopia, Axum and Lalibela. Then she went to Gondar where Baháʼís had recently been attacked and then detained in circumstances soon implicating a local priest. The uproar over the event was such that another priest and several others converted to the religion. On return to Addis Ababa the Israeli Ambassador held a formal dinner in her honor. The next three nights she spoke to Baháʼí audiences and then celebrated the Baháʼí holy day of the Birth of Baháʼu'lláh and the trip to see the Baháʼís of Sebeta. On the last return to Addis Ababa Crown Prince Asfaw Wossen received her then she resumed her tour of Africa by going next to Kenya.

== Modern community ==
Since its inception the religion has had involvement in socio-economic development beginning by giving greater freedom to women, promulgating the promotion of female education as a priority concern. That involvement was given practical expression by creating schools, agricultural coops, and clinics even then. In 1970 representatives from seven National Spiritual Assemblies in Africa and from the Baháʼí International Community were the largest delegation to the first African Conference of Non-Governmental Organizations held in Addis Ababa, Ethiopia. Of the 104 Non-Governmental Organization delegates and observers attending - representing seventy-four organizations from twenty countries in Africa- ten were Baha'is; and two Baháʼí representatives were the only participants from Mauritius and Swaziland. With background work in New York, preparatory work in Addis Ababa, and large participation by Baháʼís, they received praise for their efforts and dependability by the NGO liaison representative of the Ethiopian government and by other UN personnel. A senior officer for the United Nations Economic Commission for Africa was the speaker at the gathering sponsored by the National Spiritual Assembly of North East Africa in Asmara late in 1973 to commemorate the 125th anniversary of the Universal Declaration of Human Rights. He spoke at length about the role of the Baháʼís and like-minded organizations. He repeated his sentiments in 1980. The religion entered a new phase of activity when a message of the Universal House of Justice dated 20 October 1983 was released. Baháʼís were urged to seek out ways, compatible with the Baháʼí teachings, in which they could become involved in the social and economic development of the communities in which they lived. Worldwide in 1979 there were 129 officially recognized Baháʼí socio-economic development projects. By 1987, the number of officially recognized development projects had increased to 1482.The modern Baháʼí community of Ethiopia has multiplied its interests internally and externally along these lines.

=== Growth ===
In 1969 there was one assembly in the Sidamo Province of south central Ethiopia, 18 in 1972 and 59 in 1974. In 1975 a total of seventy Local Spiritual Assemblies formed. A cultural clash in choosing leadership happened under such quick growth. People of Sidamo were used to an open atmosphere when choosing their leaders and had difficulty adjusting to secret ballot as normal in Baháʼí electoral process. Nevertheless, the elections went forward and materials and classes were held covering the issues though human resources were thin under such rapid growth. Observers concluded that in 1975 things had gone well. In 1978 the Nure community organized and managed a local conference, and believers from other villages chaired the sessions. Succeeding local conferences were to be held in villages of Mudane and Dereba. In northern Ethiopia fighting had broken out. At one meeting Baháʼís were inundated by refugee neighbors in an apartment building from shots fired. When the police arrived the Baháʼís were vindicated from fears of cooperation in the attack when the chief of police discovered Baháʼís were involved. He summoned his aides to help the wounded, apologetically made a purely ceremonial inspection of the house, and let them go, explaining that there was no need to investigate the Baháʼís, that he knew the Baháʼís were not a source of danger and he entertained no doubts about them. There are other stories of activities of small groups of Baháʼís. In 1976 the first Baha'i newsletter in the Amharic language began publication. Sabri Elias, founder of the community in Ethiopia, and his wife, returned in 1977 for the national convention before flying on back to Djibouti.

Forty-two Baháʼís from Ethiopia attended a regional conference called for by the Universal House of Justice in 2008 held in Johannesburg. The North American Temple Baháʼí choir went to Addis Ababa in January 2009 for the 75th anniversary of the Baháʼí Faith in Ethiopia and sang at Holy Trinity Cathedral of Ethiopia, the Ethiopian National Museum and the Ethiopian National Theatre. Members of the choir flew in from U.S., Canada, Australia and Africa. Speakers at the diamond jubilee included Ali Nakhjavani and his wife Violette Nakhjavani.

=== International peace ===
In the 1990s a Racism Dance was translated by an Ethiopian Baháʼí Youth Workshop (see Oscar DeGruy) which addressed racial, national/ethnic prejudices and was used to talk about war between Eritrea and Ethiopia. There was a 2007 Ethiopian-Eritrean Baháʼí Conference held in the United States.

=== Education ===
Among the Baháʼí teachings is the importance of education. In 1980 the National Assembly of Auxiliary Board consulted on a project for the International Year of the Child. They developed the project "Ha Hu in Nine Days," which was designed to help an illiterate person learn the Amharic alphabet in only nine days. It was presented to UNESCO representative in Ethiopia and liaison officer for the UN Economic Commission for Africa followed by the Minister of Education and chairman of the National Commission for IYC. Each meeting had a reporter from the English-language newspaper, The Ethiopian Herald. An experimental garden was set up in Sidamo Province as a demonstration field in the compound of the regional center to train Baháʼí farmers in improved agricultural techniques. In 1989 a Baháʼí expert and businessman in using appropriate technology from Swaziland traveled through six southern and eastern African countries including Ethiopia training local people in the manufacture of several kinds of fence-making machines and other technologies in building, agriculture and water programs. The 10-day training courses were organized by the National Spiritual Assemblies in each of the six countries. Dr. Fisseha Eshetu, the President of Unity University, a Baháʼí inspired school, received a "Global Young Entrepreneur" award at the 7th World Summit of Young Entrepreneurs in 2000 after founding the institution in 1991. In 2001 Eshetu has taken positions on the development of the internet in Ethiopia. Unity University was the first private institution of higher education to open in Ethiopia, and as of 2001 the journalism program was the only university-level independent journalism program in the country. "Tsehai Loves Learning" is a television show of a hand puppet in the Amharic language. There are about 45 local children's classes being offered currently by Baháʼí communities in Ethiopia - more prominent schools are the School of the Nations of Ethiopia and One Planet International School.

=== Demographics ===
The Association of Religion Data Archives (relying mostly on the World Christian Encyclopedia) estimated some 26,581 Baháʼís in 2005.

== See also ==
- Religion in Ethiopia
- History of Ethiopia
