= Baháʼí Faith in Hungary =

The Baháʼí Faith in Hungary started in various mentions of the religion in the 19th century followed by ʻAbdu'l-Bahá's trip to Hungary in 1913 when Hungary's first Baháʼí joined the religion. The community suffered from World War II and communist rule until the 1980s. The National Assembly was elected in 1992 and in 2002 Baháʼí sources claimed 1100 and 1200 Baháʼís in Hungary, many of which are Roma. In 2010 the Association of Religion Data Archives estimated 290 Baháʼís in Hungary.

== Early days ==
=== Before World War I ===
Perhaps the first mention of the religion in Hungary was newspaper coverage of events in the Bábí religion in 1852.

Arminius (Ármin) Vambery in his book, "Meine Wanderungen und Erlebnisse in Persien", published in 1867, explored Persia incognito and speaks of the Báb and His followers who are associated with the beginnings of the Baháʼí Faith.

From about 1869 Hungary was part of the empire of Austria-Hungary. In 1872 Baháʼu'lláh, the founder of the religion, addressed Franz Joseph I of Austria referring to the latter's visit to Jerusalem while he was in Akka and prophesied his fall in the Kitab-i-Aqdas.

In 1912 a theosophist gave a public talk on the religion and this same individual invited ʻAbdu'l-Bahá to Hungary, aware of his journeys in the West. ʻAbdu'l-Bahá, then head of the religion after the death of his father, visited Hungary in early April 1913. Accounts of the period include a diary taken at the time, interviews years later of eyewitnesses, and newspaper stories. He arrived the afternoon of April 9 and later that afternoon gave his first talk which was on themes of universal peace, harmony of science and religion, equality of sexes and races, the right of women to vote, international law and an auxiliary language. In Budapest ʻAbdu'l-Bahá met with a number of Hungarian leaders, including both Arabs and Turks: Gyula Germanus (April 9), Canon Alexander Geisswein (the 11th), Arminius Vambery(12th and 14th) (who wrote in great admiration of Abdu'l-Baha), Ignác Goldziher (9th, 11th, 14th), Count Albert Apponyi, and Robert Nadler (10th, 12th). Among the meetings there was a singular moment of the high Cathnolic priest - Canon Alexander Geisswein - and a famous Jewish professor - Ingác Goldziher - and ʻAbdu'l-Bahá all on stage holding hands at a public meeting of 500 to 1000 people. Several of these individuals also received a letter after ʻAbdu'l-Bahá returned to Egypt. ʻAbdu'l-Bahá spoke at various public and private meetings of societies and organizations - Peace Society, Theosophists, Esperantists as well as Turkish societies. During this trip he also corresponded with Baha'is elsewhere and wrote a noteworthy tablet to America mentioning that monogamy was preferable to be just. Also during the trip Robert Nadler asked ʻAbdu'l-Bahá to sit for a portrait, which was sold to Baháʼís in 1972 and now in the Baháʼí World Center. ʻAbdu'l-Bahá revealed two prayers in Budapest ʻAbdu'l-Bahá was supposed to leave to Vienna on the 15th, but because of a cold he did not travel to Vienna until the 19th of April.

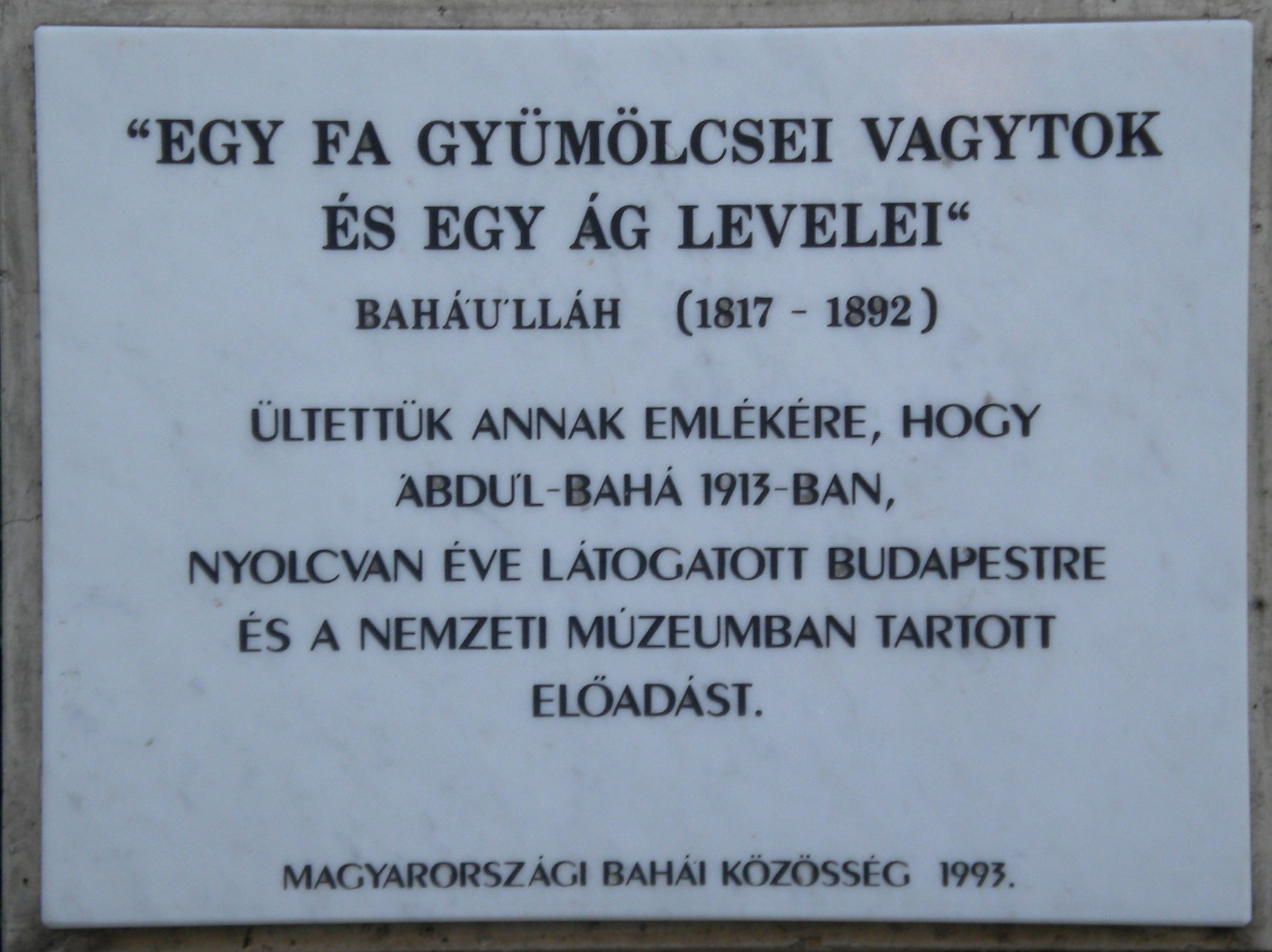
Plaque in the park of the National Museum, in memory of ʻAbdu'l-Bahá's visit to Budapest 80 years ago

According to reports of the time dozens of people associated themselves with the religion during his stay. Among them was Arminius Vambery though later that year he died. However, there is little record of this group of people aside from Vambery continuing to associate himself with the religion.

Ignác Goldziher later mentioned the religion in an article reviewing Islam in 1913, and read western newspaper accounts on the religion but did not sustain an interest in it as he personally identified with Islam and Judaism.

Later ʻAbdu'l-Bahá wrote a series of letters, or tablets, to the followers of the religion in the United States in 1916–1917 suggesting Baháʼís take the religion to many lands, including these. These letters were compiled in the book titled Tablets of the Divine Plan, but its publication was delayed owing to World War I and the Spanish flu pandemic. They were translated and published in Star of the West magazine on December 12, 1919. One tablet says in part:

"In brief, this world-consuming war has set such a conflagration to the hearts that no word can describe it. In all the countries of the world the longing for universal peace is taking possession of the consciousness of men. There is not a soul who does not yearn for concord and peace. A most wonderful state of receptivity is being realized.… Therefore, O ye believers of God! Show ye an effort and after this war spread ye the synopsis of the divine teachings in the British Isles, France, Germany, Austria-Hungary, Russia, Italy, Spain, Belgium, Switzerland, Norway, Sweden, Denmark, Holland, Portugal, Rumania, Serbia, Montenegro, Bulgaria, Greece, Andorra, Liechtenstein, Luxembourg, Monaco, San Marino, Balearic Isles, Corsica, Sardinia, Sicily, Crete, Malta, Iceland, Faroe Islands, Shetland Islands, Hebrides and Orkney Islands."

=== After World War I ===
Arminius Vambery's grandson, George Vambery, twenty years old when Hand of the Cause Martha Root visited Budapest in 1926, was very interested in the study of Táhirih's life. In 1927 Louis George Gregory's wife, Louise, traveled through Europe including Budapest. According to Shoghi Effendi, then head of the religion, an incident in 1928 Smyrna, Turkey, concerning the Baháʼís was reported in Hungarian newspapers.

Various Baháʼís traveled there from the 1930s (lecturing together with Prof. R. Vambery on the Baháʼí outlook on peace in 1932) and since.

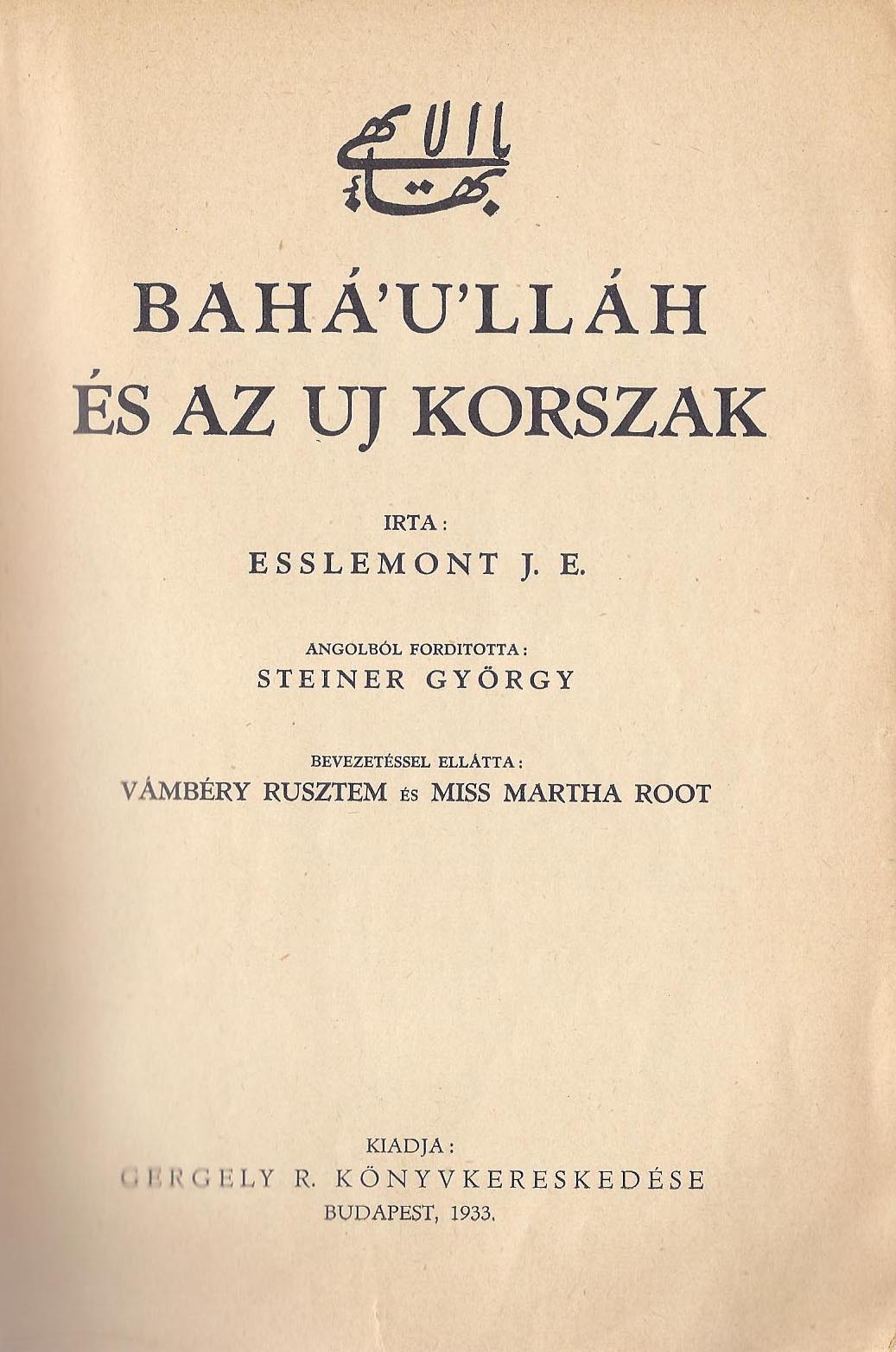
Inner front page of the first Baháʼí book in Hungarian: Esslemont J. E.: Baháʼu'lláh and the New Era (1933)

In 1932 two Baháʼís are noted in Hungary suggesting they are undertaking translating materials into Hungarian - Nicholas Erdelyi and George Steiner, both from Győr. In 1933 the first Baháʼí book in Hungarian was published. George Steiner, an Esperantist translated Esslemont's Baháʼu'lláh and the New Era. Its preface was written by Rusztem Vambery (son of Arminius Vambery) and Miss Martha Root.

There was a Local Spiritual Assembly elected in 1939 in Hungary despite increasing surveillance by national police. In 1940 Petersham Seredy was listed as having published two books relating to the religion in Hungary. However, during World War II Baháʼís were among those sent to concentration camps. as many of its early converts were from Jewish background. In 1946 two Baha'is are listed with a mailing address in Budapest - Jenny Komlos and Vilma Kiralynö. By Feb 1947 a letter was received in the US indicating the Baháʼís of Budapest had suffered with destroyed homes and in need of clothing, shoes and food with some improvement in conditions by August. After the war the assembly was re-elected in 1948 just before the Soviet occupation of Hungary from 1949 and subsequently the organization was dissolved by police action.

In the face of the Hungarian Revolution of 1956 Shoghi Effendi advised Baháʼís to remain in Budapest though many left. By 1963 there was only a smaller group of Baháʼís, failing to elect an assembly. See Goulash Communism for information on the period.

Before the 1980s there were never more than a dozen Baháʼís at any one time in Hungary and from 1937 to 1988 there was no press coverage of the religion. Around 1965 Etelka (Eta) Szász of Budapest became a Baháʼí, after visiting an Esperanto Conference in Vienna. However, in the 1980s Baháʼís are known to have traveled to Hungary. At least one Hungarian Baháʼí attended an Austrian winter school in Dec. 1985. In 1986 The Promise of World Peace was submitted to the Hungarian government. In 1987 Hand of the Cause Rúhíyyih Khanum toured the country investigating growth of the religion which was followed by a new round of newspaper stories and the opening of an information center in 1989. In January 1990 a Baha'i singing group, El Viento Canta, was able to tour Hungary and meet Baha'is in various homes, be interviewed on television, giving concerts for ambassadors and high school students. In summer 1992, the musical group Light in the Darkness from Italy, had concerts in various cities across the country which resulted in various articles and TV broadcasting. The group returned in Hungary also in 1993 and 1995.

The first re-election of the local assembly of Budapest took place in early 1990. Later in 1990 the Hungarian Ambassador to India made an official visit to the Lotus Temple. There were about 70 Baháʼís at this time.

Hand of the Cause ʻAlí-Akbar Furútan attended the founding national convention to elect the National Spiritual Assembly of Hungary in 1992.

The Hungarian government voted in favor of a UN resolution expressed concern over a wide range of human rights violations in Iran in a resolution adopted by roll-call vote after last-minute negotiations failed to achieve consensus.

== Modern community ==
Since the inception of the Baháʼí Faith, its founder Baháʼu'lláh exhorted believers to be involvemed in socio-economic development, leading individuals to become active in various projects. In Hungary a few examples exist:

- The Meséd Project begun in 2003 and some 40 participants in 2006 with the goal of teaching reading and writing to disadvantaged Roma women. In 2006 it was operating in eight towns and cities, and was reported as distinctive for its use of storytelling in the teaching of reading and writing. The word Meséd is an acronym for "Mesélő Édesanyak," which means "storytelling mothers"; the acronym itself means "your tale". In 2003, Meséd was selected as one of the five projects that were presented at the European Parliament presentations for the UNESCO Decade for a Culture of Peace and Nonviolence for the Children of the World, and has drawn local attention from government officials as well.
- Voices of Baha, an occasional international traveling Baha'i choir, sung with the Budapest Symphony Orchestra in 2003 at the Budapest Congress Center. A large part of the proceeds from ticket sales went to a development project for Roma women in Hungary.
- Hungarian vocalist Noémi Kiss participated in the Baha'i Chant Project, aimed at cultivating enthusiasm for collective (group) chant. The group recorded their performance for the World Day of Prayer, in September, 2009.

=== 21st century ===
In 2001 opening of Baháʼí terraced gardens was witnessed by the Hungarian Ambassador.

The Baháʼí administrative system outgrew its old rented administrative headquarters, the Baháʼí community of Hungary inaugurated its new national Center with a reception on 27 November 2002 with civic and religious dignitaries attending.

Hungarians play an active role in protecting human rights in Iran. Otto von Habsburg remembers in an interview that it was worth raising up his voice in the European Parliament for the human rights of the Baháʼís in Iran. There were two speeches in the Hungarian Parliament about the treatment of Baháʼís in Iran (Ms. Erzsébet Geberle MP on 12 October 2009 and Ms. Ágnes Osztolykán MP on 19 October 2010). In a campaign to show support for victims of human rights abuses in Iran well-known Hungarian personalities posted video messages including Kinga Göncz, a member of the European Parliament and former Hungarian Minister of Foreign Affairs and Márta Sebestyén, a UNESCO Artist for Peace.

=== Demographics ===
The Baháʼís are spread among some 65 localities in Hungary.

In accordance with a 2011 religion law 82 religious groups, including the Baháʼís, asked to be officially recognized by the parliament. In February 2012 this registration was established for the Baháʼís among others though some were excluded.

== See also ==
- History of Hungary
- Religion in Hungary
