= Malcolm McKesson =

American outsider artist

Malcolm McKesson (July 24, 1909 – February 5, 1999) was an American outsider artist known for his ballpoint pen drawings and his erotic fiction. He was the husband of poet Madeline Mason-Manheim.

== Biography ==
Malcolm McKesson was born in Monmouth Beach, New Jersey at the summer house of his wealthy New York City family. He completed the Grand Tour of Europe twice before turning eighteen, sparking his interest in art history, which he later studied at Harvard University. His grandfather died in 1924 and his eldest brother in 1927.

McKesson entered Harvard College in 1933 and experienced another death in 1936, of his sister Mary. Graduating in 1937, he served as a second lieutenant during World War II, marrying poet Madeline Mason-Manheim at Fort McClellan, Alabama in 1942. Upon returning to New York, he worked in the family chemical company until 1961, when with Mason's support he was able to retire from the business world and devote his life to his art in secret. Other than his early retirement, the couple led a conventional middle-class life in New York City, summering in the Catskills and serving on the boards of a variety of community organizations, with none of their friends aware of McKesson's other life.

Madeline Mason died in 1990. Three years later, McKesson approached dealers at the New York Outsider Art Fair. Although he did not necessarily think of himself as an outsider, he suspected that others at the fair might appreciate his work based on the other work present.

== Writing ==
McKesson's writing explores themes of gender identity, transvestism, and sado-masochism, all of which are developed in the semi-autobiographical erotica novella, Matriarchy: Freedom in Bondage, his magnum opus. This book follows the sexual transformation of Harvard undergraduate Gerald Graham, who willingly subjects himself to the authority of the stern Lady Gladys. She teaches him to "curb his manly nature" by forcing him to take on the role and costume of a lady's maid named Rose. The house is a matriarchy because, as Lady Gladys explains, "in this house all things feminine are blessed, all things masculine are bound in slavery" (McKesson 1997, p. 46). Much of Gerald's training involves elaborate sexual bondage devices. The narrative voice shifts from first person into third person as Gerald subjects himself more and more to Gladys's authority.

Matriarchy is illustrated by hundreds of detailed ballpoint drawings of vaguely defined figures, modeled by voluptuous and androgynous masses, and taking place in dim lighting.

== Resources ==
- McKesson, Malcolm. (1997). Matriarchy: Freedom in Bondage. Heck Editions. ISBN 0-9638129-7-1.
- Rhodes, Colin. (2002). "Fulfillments of desire in the work of a self-taught artist: the intimate existence of Malcolm McKesson." Journal of the Association of Art Historians. 25 (5), 649–675.
