= Sara Blomfield =

Irish Baha'i and rights campaigner

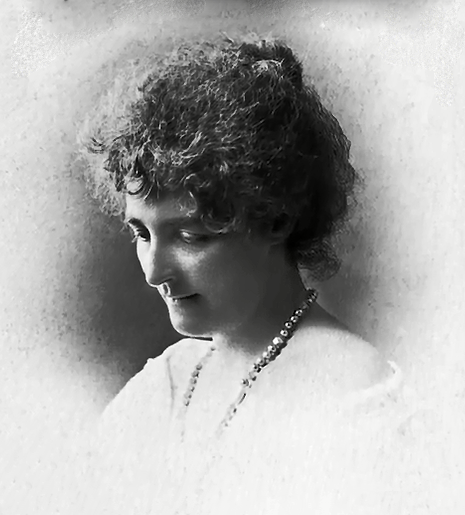
- Born: 1859; Ireland
- Died: 1939 (aged 79–80); Belsize Grove, Hampstead, England
- Organization(s): Save the Children Fund, Animal Defence and Anti-Vivisection Society
- Spouse: Arthur Blomfield

Sara Louisa Blomfield (née Ryan; 1859 – 1939) was an Irish humanitarian and early member of the Baháʼí Faith in the British Isles, and a supporter of the rights of children and women. She became styled Lady Blomfield after her husband was knighted in 1889.

== Career ==
Blomfield was born in Ireland and spent much of her adult life in London and Broadway, Worcestershire. She was married to the noted Victorian era architect Arthur Blomfield, son of Charles James Blomfield, Bishop of London. An accomplished writer and humanitarian, Blomfield assisted in founding the Save the Children Fund and was a supporter of the adoption of the Geneva Declaration of the Rights of the Child by the League of Nations.

Blomfield joined the Baháʼí Faith in 1907 and soon became one of its outstanding proponents and historians. During the visit of ʻAbdu'l-Bahá to Paris, she took copious notes of his public meetings which were used in preparing the volume called "Paris Talks". As a tribute to her, ʻAbdu'l-Baha bestowed upon her the name "Sitárih Khanum" (in Persian, "sitárih" means "star", and "khanum" means "lady"). After the passing of ʻAbdu'l-Baha in 1921, Blomfield accompanied Shoghi Effendi on his trip from Britain to Haifa. While in Haifa, she interviewed members of Baha'u'llah's family. Those recorded recollections, together with her account of the days when she hosted ʻAbdu'l-Baha in London, make up the contents of her book, "The Chosen Highway."

Blomfield was an anti-vivisectionist. She was a member of the Animal Defence and Anti-Vivisection Society's executive council.

== Death ==
Blomfield spent her final days at a nursing home. She died on 31 December 1939 at Belsize Grove, Hampstead.

== Selected publications ==
- Blomfield, Lady (1967) [1940]. The Chosen Highway. London, UK: Baháʼí Publishing Trust.
- The Passing of ʻAbdu'l-Bahá, coauthored with Shoghi Effendi.
- Blomfield's copious notes are the basis of much of Paris Talks.
