= Theodore Conrath =

American painter and sculptor

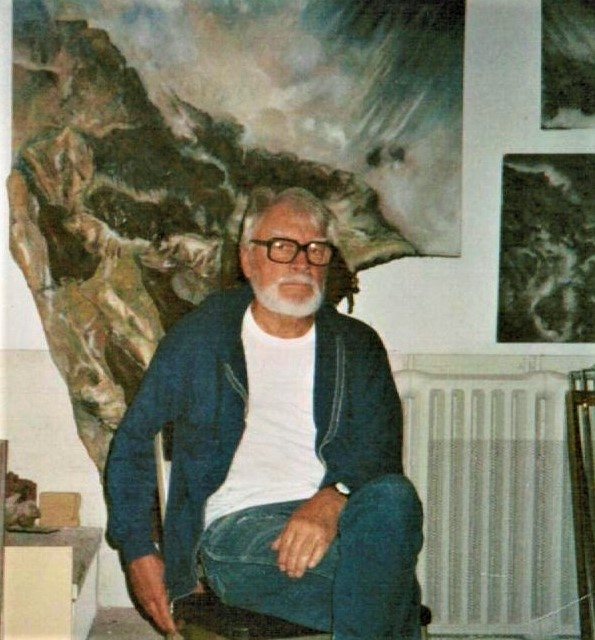
- Conrath in studio, 1994
- Born: June 6, 1920; Hebron, North Dakota
- Died: January 4, 1995

Theodore "Ted" Conrath (June 6, 1920 - January 4, 1995) was a painter, sculptor, and teacher. In 1949, he illustrated a book of poetry by Madeline Mason, The Cage of Years, which is in collection at the Metropolitan Museum of Art. The New York Times commented, "the symbolic illustrations by Theodore Conrath only lack color to remind us of Blake." The work earned Conrath full membership into the National Arts Club, where he was active until 1954.

== Life and career ==
Born in Hebron, North Dakota to German immigrants, Conrath discovered art at age nine, despite having a significant physical handicap. A fall as a baby onto a hot stove left the first two fingers of his right hand severely scarred and fused together. He would later say in a 1938 interview with the Bismarck Tribune that this proved to be an advantage as he used those fingers together to move paint across the canvas; "in many ways it's been a blessing." At 17, he sculpted a bust of governor William Langer, which was exhibited at the State Capitol in Bismarck, and in 1938, his copy of Heinrich Hofmann's "Christ in Gethsemane" was published in Boy's Life magazine. Through the help of teacher and painter, Zoe Beiler, Conrath earned a scholarship to the Art Institute of Chicago, but was unable to accept it when his National Guard unit was enlisted to fight in World War II.

Conrath fought in the 164th Regiment at the Battle of Guadalcanal. This was the first Army unit to ever fight alongside the Marines in battle, which earned them the nickname, "the 164th Marines." On November 23, 1942, amid fierce jungle fighting, he witnessed his childhood friend, Hermann Diede, die from sniper fire. After the war, he moved to New York City and through the G.I. Bill studied at the Art Students League under William Barnett and John Groth. In 1962, the Key Gallery in Manhattan granted him a solo exhibition of his art. After that, his work fell into obscurity.

In 2018, 17 pieces of Conrath's work were discovered in a thrift store in Tarrytown, New York. His record of membership at the National Arts Club, which had been lost, was restored and ten of the paintings were displayed in their Marquis Gallery from October, 2019 to January, 2020 in an exhibition titled, Discovery and Restoration: Ted Conrath.

In November 2021, the historical journal, the "Eberbacher Geschichtsblatt," published an in-depth exploration of Conrath's life and work. It traced his roots back to Eberbach, Germany, and examined the wealth of artistic talent on both sides of his family, including cousin Hanna Spohr and grandfather Emil Krauth, who long resided in the small Imperial Free City.
