= Madeline Mason-Manheim =

American poet

Madeline Mason-Manheim, also known by the pseudonym Tyler Mason (1908–1990), was an American poet and translator. Her work was also published under the names Madeline Mason and Tyler Mason. She was married to the outsider artist and novelist Malcolm McKesson.

== Early life ==
Mason-Manheim was born into a socially prominent family in New York on January 24, 1908 (though some sources list her year of birth as 1902 or 1905).

== Career and social life ==
Her first collection of poetry, Hill Fragments, was published in 1925, and featured an introduction from Arthur Symons, as well as illustrations by Kahlil Gibran. She continued her association with Gibran by translating his work The Prophet into French; this translation was published in 1926.

In the 1930s, Mason-Manheim was a regular in the "Social" pages of the New York Times.

In 1942, Mason-Manheim married Malcolm McKesson, whom she had met at a debutante ball. McKesson claimed that the union was never consummated; however, the pair remained married until Mason-Manheim's death in 1990.

Mason-Manheim wrote The Cage of Years, which was published in 1949. The work featured illustrations by Theodore Conrath and is held in the collection of the Metropolitan Museum of Art.

Mason-Manheim devised the "Mason sonnet" in 1953. This poetic form is composed of fourteen lines, divided into an octave and a sestet, with the pivot coming after the octave. The lines are in iambic pentameter, with rhyme scheme ABCABCBC DBADDA.

== Death and legacy ==
Mason-Manheim's papers are held by the Briscoe Center for American History at the University of Texas at Austin.

== Works ==
- Mason-Manheim, Madeline. Hill Fragments. London: Cecil Palmer (1925).
- Mason, Tyler and Edward M. House. Riding for Texas. New York: Reynal & Hitchcock (1936).
- Mason, Madeline. The Cage of Years. New York: The Bond Wheelright Company (1949).
