= List of animal welfare organizations =

Animal welfare organizations are concerned with the health, safety and psychological wellness of individual animals. These organizations include humane societies aiming to reduce farm animal suffering, animal rescue groups and wildlife rehabilitation centers, which care for animals in distress and sanctuaries, where animals are brought to live and be protected for the rest of their lives. Their goals are generally distinct from conservation organizations, which are primarily concerned with the preservation of species, populations, habitats, ecosystems and biodiversity, rather than the welfare of individual animals.

For organizations with Wikipedia pages, see Category:Animal welfare organizations.

== Worldwide or serving multiple countries ==
- Animal People (based in U.S.)
- Animal Transportation Association
- Animal Welfare Institute
- Animal Welfare Investigations Project
- Association of Zoos and Aquariums
- Association for Assessment and Accreditation of Laboratory Animal Care International
- Australia for Dolphins
- BirdLife International
- Brooke Hospital for Animals (equine)
- Care for the Wild International
- Compassion in World Farming
- The Donkey Sanctuary (based in U.K.)
- Friends of Animals
- Four Paws
- Global Alliance for Rabies Control
- Grey2K USA
- Humane Slaughter Association (based in UK)
- Humane World for Animals
- International Animal Rescue
- International Bird Rescue (based in California)
- International Fund for Animal Welfare (IFAW)
- International Primate Protection League
- Marine Connection
- Monkey World (based in U.K.)
- People for the Ethical Treatment of Animals
- Performing Animal Welfare Society
- Royal Society for the Prevention of Cruelty to Animals
- Shrimp Welfare Project (farmed shrimp; based in U.K.)
- SANCCOB (seabirds, based in South Africa)
- Universities Federation for Animal Welfare (UFAW)
- Vegan Outreach
- Vets Beyond Borders
- Vets for Change
- Whale and Dolphin Conservation Society
- World Animal Protection
- World Association of Zoos and Aquariums
- World Horse Welfare

=== Asia ===
- Abhay Daanam, India and Sri Lanka
- Animals Asia Foundation
- Animals Now, Israel
- Todd's Welfare Society, Pakistan
- Philippine Animal Welfare Society (PAWS), Philippines
- Wildlife SOS, India
- Soi Dog Foundation, Thailand

=== Europe ===
- Eurogroup for Animals
- Prince Laurent Foundation
- International Zoo Veterinary Group

== Australia ==
- Animals Australia
- Give Our Strays A Chance
- Humane Society International Australia
- Lone Pine Koala Sanctuary
- Lost Dogs' Home
- RSPCA Australia
- Voiceless, the animal protection institute

=== New South Wales ===
- Cat Protection Society of NSW
- DoggieRescue.com
- RSPCA NSW

=== Victoria ===
- Cat Protection Society of Victoria

=== Tasmania ===
- RSPCA Tasmania

== Austria ==
- Four Paws

== The Bahamas ==
- Bahamas Humane Society

== Bolivia ==
- Comunidad Inti Wara Yassi
- La Senda Verde (wildlife)
- Voluntarios en Defensa de los Animales

== Bulgaria ==
- Animal Rescue Sofia

== Canada ==
- Canada's Accredited Zoos and Aquariums
- Canadian Association for Laboratory Animal Science
- Canadian Council on Animal Care (lab animals)
- Canadian Federation of Humane Societies
- Canadian Science Centre for Human and Animal Health

=== British Columbia ===
- British Columbia Society for the Prevention of Cruelty to Animals (BC SPCA)
- Richmond Animal Protection Society
- Senior Animals In Need Today Society
- Vancouver Orphan Kitten Rescue Association

=== Alberta ===
- Alberta SPCA
- Cochrane & Area Humane Society
- Second Chance Animal Rescue Society
- Voice for Animals Humane Society

=== Manitoba ===
- Prairie Wildlife Rehabilitation Centre

=== Ontario ===
- Little RES Q (Toronto, turtles)
- Ontario Society for the Prevention of Cruelty to Animals
- Prairie Wildlife Rehabilitation Centre
- Toronto Humane Society

=== Quebec ===
- Fauna Foundation

=== Nova Scotia ===
- Nova Scotia Society for the Prevention of Cruelty

== China ==
- Chinese Animal Protection Network
- Wah Yan College Cats

=== Hong Kong ===
- Hong Kong Dog Rescue
- Jane Goodall Institute (Hong Kong)
- Cat Society Hong Kong
- Society for the Prevention of Cruelty to Animals SPCA (Hong Kong)

== Denmark ==
- Anima
- Inges kattehjem

== Egypt ==
- Society for Protection of Animal Rights in Egypt

== Germany ==
- Deutsche Arbeitsgemeinschaft zum Schutz der Eulen (owls)

== Ghana ==
- Ghana Wildlife Society

== India ==
- Abubshahar Wildlife Sanctuary
- Animal Welfare Board of India
- Bhartiya Gau Raksha Dal
- Bir Bara Ban Wildlife Sanctuary
- Bir Shikargah Wildlife Sanctuary
- Blue Cross of Hyderabad
- Blue Cross of India (Chennai)
- Federation of Indian Animal Protection Organization
- Indian National Kennel Club
- Khol Hi-Raitan Wildlife Sanctuary
- National Institute of Animal Welfare
- People for Animals
- PETA India

== Ireland ==
- DSPCA
- Irish Blue Cross
- Sathya Sai Donkey Sanctuary (Sathya Sai Trust for Nature)

== Japan ==
- Institute of Cetacean Research
- Kuroshima Research Station
- Ogasawara Whale Watching Association
- Reiwa Shinsengumi
- Wild Bird Society of Japan
- Yamashina Institute for Ornithology

== Jersey ==
- Jersey Society for the Prevention of Cruelty to Animals

== Kenya ==
- David Sheldrick Wildlife Trust

== Korea ==
- Korea Animal Rights Advocates

== Malaysia ==
- Sarawak Society for the Prevention of Cruelty to Animals
- SPCA Selangor, Malaysia

== Maldives ==
- Feline Welfare Organization – Focuses on stray cat welfare through TNR, feeding programs, and shelters.

== Nepal ==
- Animal Welfare Network Nepal
- Kathmandu Animal Treatment Centre

== The Netherlands ==
- Dutch Society for the Protection of Animals

== Norway ==
- Dyrebeskyttelsen Norge

== New Zealand ==
- Royal New Zealand Society for the Prevention of Cruelty to Animals
- SAFE, Save Animals From Exploitation

== Pakistan ==
- Todd's Welfare Society
- Pakistan Animal Welfare Society

== Philippines ==
- Philippine Tarsier Foundation in Bohol

== Singapore ==
- Singapore Society for the Prevention of Cruelty to Animals
- Animal Concerns Research and Education Society (ACRES)

== South Africa ==
- National Council of SPCAs (NSPCA)
- Chimp Eden

== Switzerland ==
- Susy Utzinger Animal Welfare Foundation

== Thailand ==
- Elephant Nature Park
- Elephantstay
- Wildlife Friends Foundation Thailand (WFFT)
- Thai Society for the Prevention of Cruelty to Animals
- Soi Dog Foundation in Bangkok, Phuket

== Turkey ==
- HAYTAP

== Uganda ==
- Ziwa Rhino Sanctuary

== United Kingdom ==
- Animal Defence and Anti-Vivisection Society
- Assisi Animal Sanctuary
- Badger Trust
- Battersea Dogs and Cats Home (London)
- Blue Cross
- Born Free Foundation
- British Divers Marine Life Rescue
- British Horse Society
- Cats Protection
- Centre for Animals and Social Justice
- Conservative Animal Welfare Foundation
- Dogs Trust
- Eurogroup for Animals
- Farm Animal Welfare Council
- Hillside Animal Sanctuary
- The Horse Trust
- Hounds for Heroes
- League Against Cruel Sports
- The Mayhew Animal Home
- National Animal Welfare Trust
- National Office of Animal Health
- National Society for the Abolition of Cruel Sports
- National Wildlife Crime Unit
- Oxford Centre for Animal Ethics
- People's Dispensary for Sick Animals
- Redwings Horse Sanctuary
- Retired Greyhound Trust
- Royal Society for the Prevention of Cruelty to Animals (RSPCA)
- Save Me (animal welfare)
- Scottish Society for Prevention of Cruelty to Animals
- Screech Owl Sanctuary
- Swan Sanctuary, Shepperton
- Thornberry Animal Sanctuary
- Ulster Society for the Prevention of Cruelty to Animals
- Wetheriggs Zoo and Animal Sanctuary
- Viva! (organisation)

== United States ==
- Alley Cat Allies
- American Humane Society
- American Society for the Prevention of Cruelty to Animals
- American Tortoise Rescue
- Animal People
- Animal Protection and Rescue League
- Best Friends Animal Society
- Coastal Pet Rescue
- Farm Sanctuary
- Food Animal Concerns Trust
- Humane Farm Animal Care
- The Humane League
- Humane Research Council
- Humane Society of the United States
- Mustang Heritage Foundation
- National Animal Interest Alliance
- No Kill Advocacy Center
- Office of Laboratory Animal Welfare
- Petfinder
- Pets for Vets
- Sky Ark
- United States Association of Reptile Keepers
- Wild Animal Initiative
- The Wild Animal Sanctuary

=== Alabama ===
- Alabama Wildlife Center

=== California ===
- Animal Ethics
- Animal Rescue Foundation
- Dedication and Everlasting Love to Animals Rescue
- Helen Woodward Animal Center
- Hope for Paws
- House Rabbit Society
- Northcoast Marine Mammal Center

=== Colorado ===
- Dumb Friends League
- The Wild Animal Sanctuary

=== Florida ===
- Humane Society of Pinellas

=== Illinois ===
- The Anti-Cruelty Society
- Safe Humane Chicago

=== Indiana ===
- Black Pine Animal Sanctuary
- Friends of Indianapolis Animal Care & Control
- Humane Society of Indianapolis

=== Louisiana ===
- Villalobos Rescue Center (New Orleans, featured on the television series Pit Bulls & Parolees)

=== Massachusetts ===
- Massachusetts Society for the Prevention of Cruelty to Animals-Angell Animal Medical Center
- Winslow Farm

=== Michigan ===
- Michigan Humane Society

=== New Jersey ===
- New Jersey Society for the Prevention of Cruelty to Animals

=== New York ===
- Friends of Animals
- North Shore Animal League America
- Woodstock Farm Sanctuary
- Sato Project
- Schwarzman Animal Medical Center

=== North Carolina ===
- Goathouse Refuge

=== Oregon ===
- Chimps Inc.

=== Pennsylvania ===
- Animal Rescue League of Western Pennsylvania
- Humane League of Lancaster County
- Red Paw Emergency Relief Team

=== Tennessee ===
- The Elephant Sanctuary (Hohenwald)
- Tiger Haven

=== Texas ===
- Bat World Sanctuary
- Operation Kindness

=== Virginia ===
- Humane Farm Animal Care

== Zimbabwe ==
- Zimbabwe Society for the Prevention of Cruelty to Animals

== See also ==
- Society for the Prevention of Cruelty to Animals
- List of animal rights advocates
- List of animal rights groups
