= Gesellschaft zur Erhaltung der Eulen e. V. =

German owl conservation organization

- Gesellschaft zur Erhaltung der Eulen e. V.
- Abbreviation: EGE
- Predecessor: Aktion zur Wiedereinbürgerung des Uhus
- Formation: 1990
- Type: Registered association
- Legal status: Non-profit organization
- Purpose: Owl conservation
- Headquarters: Bad Münstereifel, Germany
- Region served: Germany
- Chair: Stefan Brücher
- Website: egeeulen.de

Gesellschaft zur Erhaltung der Eulen e. V. (EGE, officially rendered in English as the Society for the Conservation of Owls) is a German non-profit conservation association based in Bad Münstereifel, North Rhine-Westphalia. Founded in 1990, it developed from the earlier Aktion zur Wiedereinbürgerung des Uhus ("Project for the Reintroduction of the Eagle Owl"), established in 1973.

The association focuses on the conservation of European owl species, including the Eurasian eagle-owl, little owl, and barn owl. It is listed by the Umweltbundesamt as a formally recognized environmental and nature-conservation association under German law.

== History ==
The organization originated in efforts to restore the Eurasian eagle-owl population in Germany. The Aktion zur Wiedereinbürgerung des Uhus, founded in 1973, carried out a long-term reintroduction programme for the species in West Germany.

In 1990 the initiative was reorganized as the Gesellschaft zur Erhaltung der Eulen. Stefan Brücher, one of the founders, became head of the association in 2006 following the death of Wilhelm Bergerhausen.

== Activities ==
EGE conducts field monitoring, species protection projects, research, and environmental education, and participates in planning and permitting procedures related to wildlife conservation.

The association is closely associated with eagle-owl conservation in the Eifel, including nest monitoring, ringing of juveniles, and long-term population tracking.

EGE has taken part in national conservation efforts addressing bird mortality at power infrastructure. Conservation organizations including NABU and the Bavarian LBV have jointly called for safer designs of medium-voltage power poles to reduce electrocution risks for large birds of prey.

The organization operates eagle-owl webcams that have attracted a wide public audience. In 2021, a nest camera in the Eifel drew hundreds of concurrent viewers.

In addition to eagle-owl work, EGE maintains conservation projects for other owl species. Monitoring of little owl populations in the Cologne Basin has been combined with nest-box installation and habitat protection since the early 1990s.

== Legal status ==
EGE is included on the federal list of recognized environmental and nature-conservation associations maintained by the German Federal Environment Agency.

== See also ==
- German Association for the Protection of Owls
- Eurasian eagle-owl
