= Anti-Cruelty Society =

Non-profit organization in Chicago, Illinois, US

Anti-Cruelty
- Formation: 1899
- Headquarters: Chicago, Illinois, US
- Website: anticruelty.org

Anti-Cruelty is an animal welfare organization and animal shelter in the River North neighborhood of Chicago, Illinois. Anti-Cruelty is a private, not-for-profit humane society that does not receive government assistance. It is one of the largest such organizations in the United States. The organization offers adoption, veterinarian, and training services.

It was founded on January 19, 1899, by a group of Chicago residents who had concerns about the treatment of the city's animals, from stray cats and dogs, to workhorses, to livestock. Anti-Cruelty exists to prevent cruelty to animals and to advance humane education. Their mission is building a community of caring by helping pets and educating people.

== History ==
=== 1899–1911 ===
Rosa Fay Thomas founded Anti-Cruelty on March 7, 1899, in Chicago and was elected first acting president, upon the belief that society had an obligation to care and raise awareness for animals living in cruel conditions. Its first shelter for small animals opened in 1904. Anti-Cruelty’s first campaign to eliminate animal mistreatment/provide better care for animals involved improving the living and working conditions of workhorses in the city of Chicago in 1905. Early goals of the foundation concentrated on endeavors for workhorses, livestock, and small animals. For a short time, in addition to animal welfare, Anti-Cruelty focused its efforts on child welfare cases. In 1906, the State of Illinois allotted a charter to the Anti-Cruelty to ensure the welfare of both animal and child welfare. During this time, the Anti-Cruelty implemented its first humane education movement to provide basic access to literature and lectures.

=== 1911–1949 ===
The demand for services provided by Anti-Cruelty grew exponentially during the Great Depression.

Anti-Cruelty runs through the funds that are donated to them. Anti-cruelty started after Rosa saw the mistreatment of horses. One of their first acts of business was putting up drinking fountains for the horses.

=== 1950–2000 ===
In 1976, Anti-Cruelty began the volunteer program that is still open available today.

Anti-Cruelty's Mobile Vaccination Clinic began in 1986 offering free exams and vaccinations for cats and dogs to the disadvantaged neighborhoods in Chicago.

=== 2001–2010 ===
As of 2010, Anti-Cruelty has been using the services provided by Pet Point Data Management System, run by PetHealth. They provide inventory on adoptable cats and dogs which can help keep track of animal populations and facilitates the adoption processes. This service is provided for free to non-profit animal organizations and when an animal is adopted they provide a trackable chip.

=== 2011–2020 ===
In 2014, Chicago's Alderman passed the Anti-Puppy Mill Ordinance 49-1, which did not allow dogs, cats and other animals to be sheltered if they came from large-scale breeding operations. This helps to prevent the animals that are in current shelters to be forgotten about; sales on animals made by breeders often get sold in pet shops which leaves animals in shelters, who are usually mixed breeds and older to be overlooked.

In the pandemic of 2020, with a grant from PetSmart Charities, Anti-Cruelty offered supplies of pet food to families affected by COVID-19. Anti-cruelty also expanded the "Friends Who Care" program to help pet owners receive veterinarian services for their pets.

Before Illinois' stay-at-home order in March 2020, Anti-Cruelty urged people to foster animals because of an influx of pets and a limit of space in the shelters.

== Services ==
=== Adoption ===
Anti-Cruelty has a yearly event, "Clear The Shelters", where the adoption fees are waived and all their pets are up to date in vaccines.

=== Clinic ===
Anti-Cruelty's spay/neuter clinic—one of the highest volume spay/neuter clinics in the country—performed over 12,000 surgeries and also found new homes for nearly 6,000 animals.

== See also ==
- List of animal welfare groups
