= Give Our Strays A Chance =

Australian animal rescue organization

GOSAC - Give Our Strays A Chance
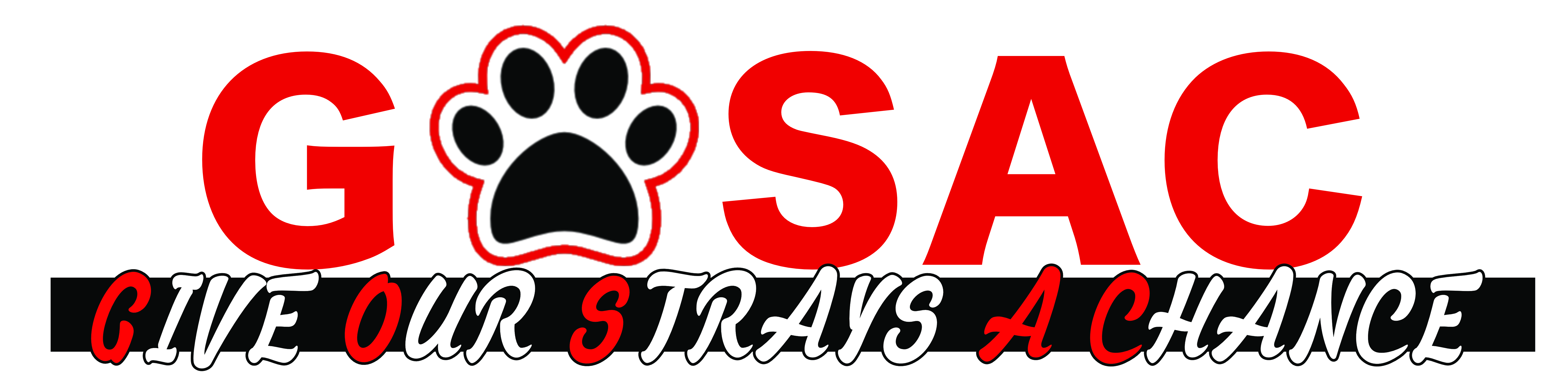

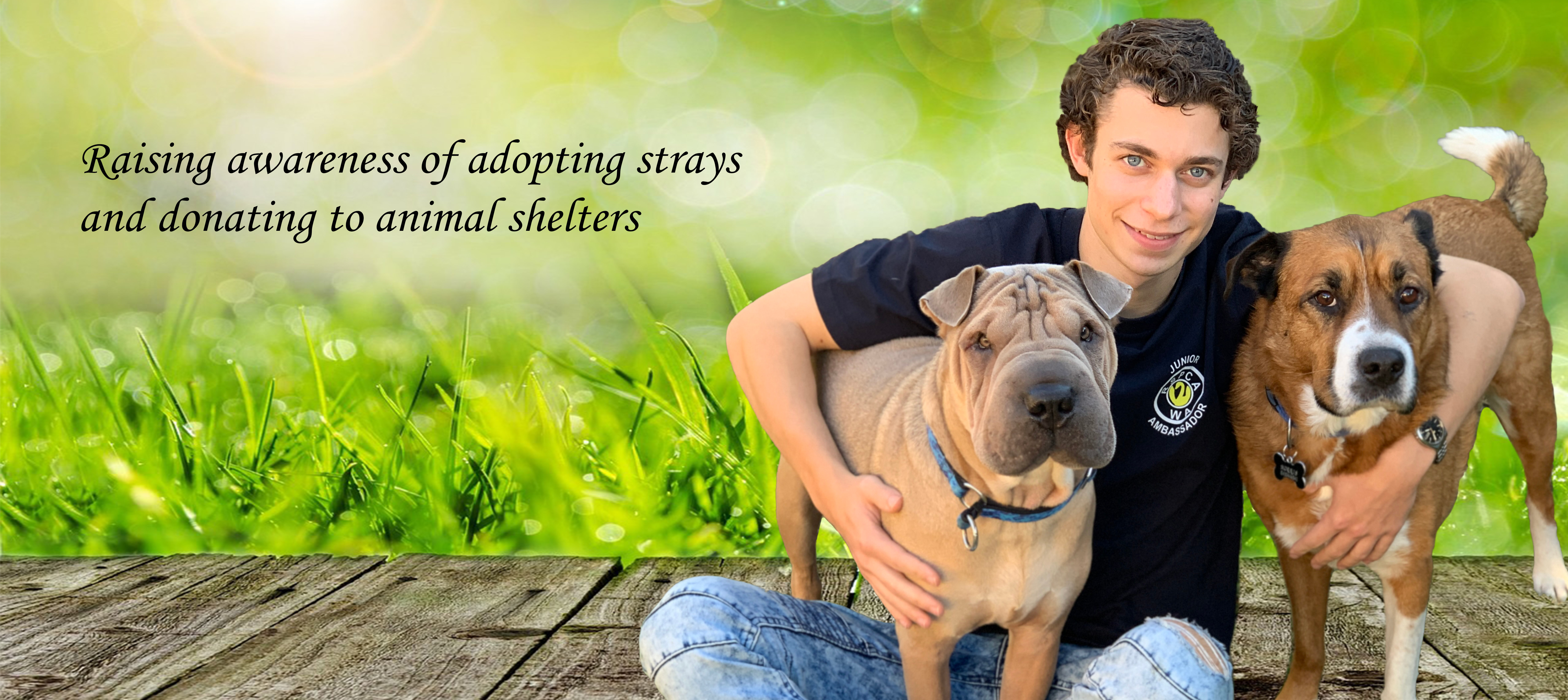
- Abbreviation: GOSAC
- Established: 2013
- Founder: Dean Morris
- Founded at: Western Australia
- Legal status: Registered charity
- Purpose: Raising awareness and donations for animal shelters and animal rescue groups
- Location: GOSAC Donations Crate at Coles Forest Lakes, Thornlie
- Region served: Australia
- Director, CEO: Dean Morris
- Website: www.gosac.info

Give Our Strays A Chance (GOSAC) is an organisation founded in 2013 by a Western Australian 10-year-old boy Dean Morris, for the purpose of raising awareness of animal rescue and raising donations for animal shelters and pounds.

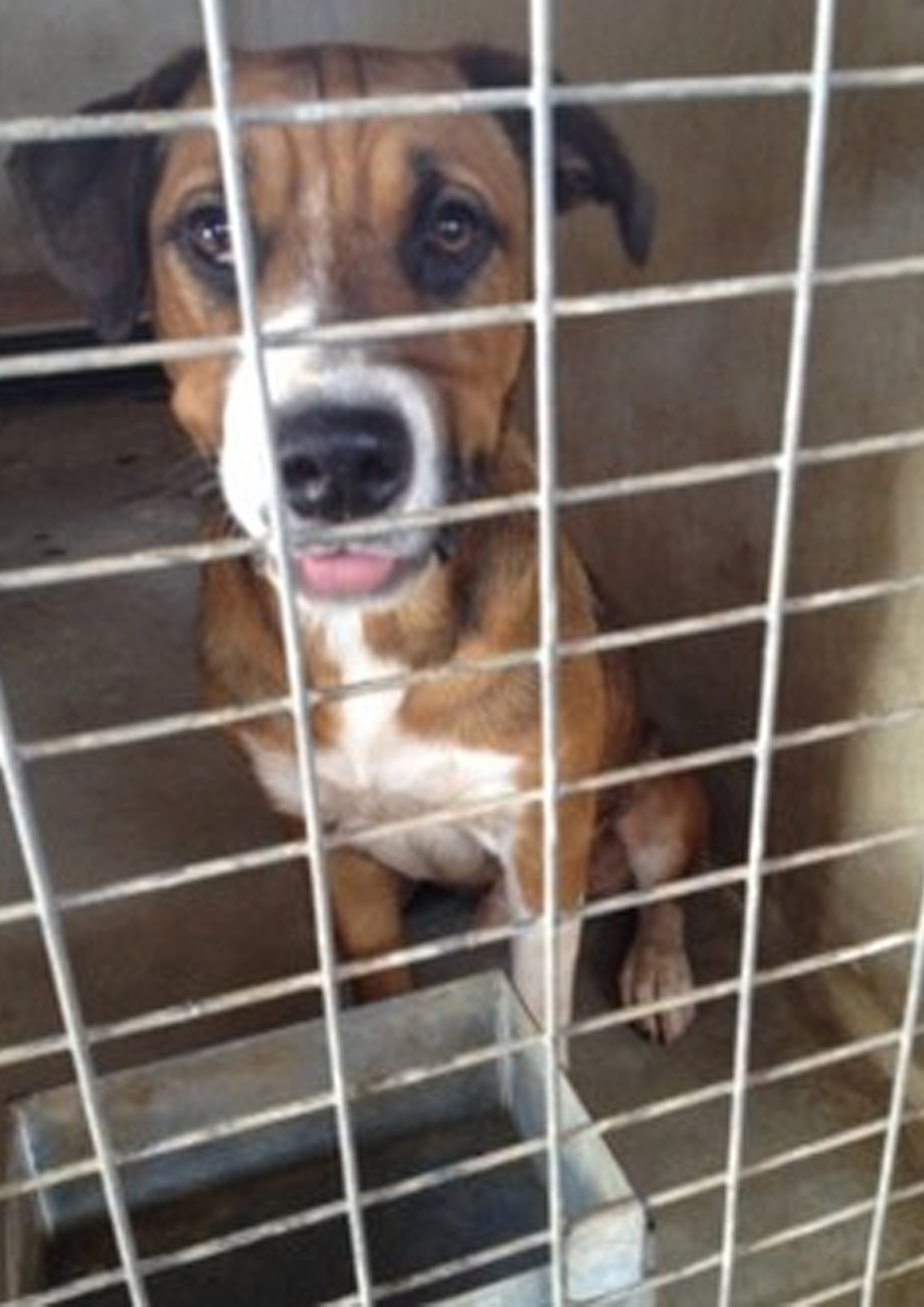
Hooch in the pound before he was rescued

Getting Australian and international businesses on board together with local communities and the media, GOSAC has saved many stray animals and raised hundreds of thousands of dollars in donations.

Over holiday seasons, GOSAC assists the homeless feed and care for their pets

During bush fire seasons, including the 2021 Wooroloo Bushfire in Western Australia, GOSAC collected and delivered surgical and medical supplies to wildlife animal rescues. GOSAC also provided over 2 tonnes of wildlife food for the animals returning to the fire grounds.

Through COVID-19, GOSAC has partnered with ARC (Animal Rescue Cooperative) and Petbarn Foundation to work on the Act Of Kindness project, helping struggling Australian families feed their pets. As local borders closed within Western Australia, GOSAC delivered donations to remote animal rescues who were stranded without supplies. It was named "Operation Narrogin".

== Founding ==
In 2013 Dean Morris rescued his dog "Hooch" from a country pound. Wanting to donate all his savings, Dean made his way to the pound where he encountered the confronting reality of stray animals. Every year over 250,000 cats and dogs are euthanised in Australia, Dean was determined to do something about it. As part of his school project at the Gifted and Talented program, Dean created GOSAC - Give Our Strays A Chance.

== Events ==
=== GOSAC Day ===
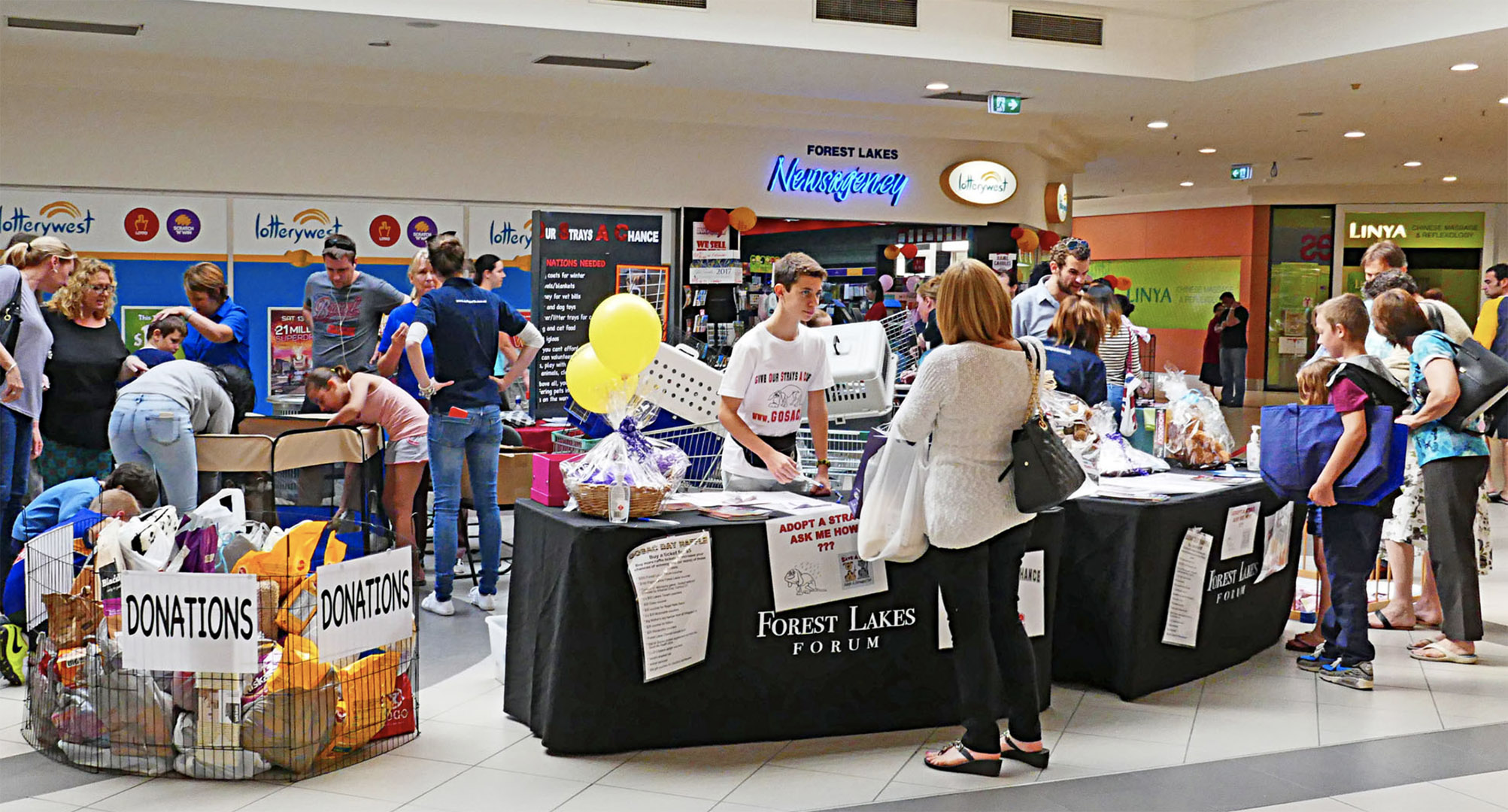
GOSAC Day 2017 at the Forest Lakes Shopping Centre

A regular GOSAC fundraising event at shopping centres such as Forest Lakes Shopping Centre and Halls Head Central in Western Australia, where the community comes together to raise awareness and donations for the strays.,

=== Kelmscott Show and De Stress Day ===
GOSAC has been participating in the University of Western Australia's bi-annual De Stress day, where university students have the chance to adopt the strays, donate or volunteer to foster cats and dogs.

The West Australian Kelmscott Show invited GOSAC to take part in their 2017 and 2018 events. All strays were adopted and hundreds of dollars were donated on the day.

== Saving The World ==
In 2021 Morris published a non-fiction book about his experiences and the importance of animal rescue efforts, titled Saving The World - One Stray At A Time.

== Success ==
While GOSAC started as a school project, it developed into an award-winning, statewide success story. Community support made it possible to save more animals from euthanasia and improve living conditions at animal shelters. In less than 7 years, GOSAC raised hundreds of thousands of dollars in cash and item donations, while saving many stray animals' lives.

Following the success of GOSAC, schools around the world are drawing inspiration from the young boy's success, teaching students that even kids can make a difference. In recognition of Dean's GOSAC work and his substantial contribution to animal welfare in Western Australia, he was appointed as an RSPCA WA Youth Ambassador. Subsequently, Dean has also won the first RSPCA WA Youth State Award for 2018. Dean was a finalist for Channel 7 Young Achiever Award for Community Service and Volunteering as well as Leadership. He was also named a finalist for WA Youth Award. In September 2020, Dean won Matt Keogh's Burt Award for his contribution to Animal Welfare as well as his work in the local and wider community Dean received the Australia Day Young Citizen of the Year Award for 2021 and became an Australia Day ambassador, encouraging communities to come together to "Reflect, Respect and Celebrate" the Australian spirit and diversity.

== See also ==
- Animal welfare and rights in Australia
- List of animal welfare organizations
