= Steven Stolen =

Radio show host

- Education: Simpson College; University of Michigan
- Occupation: Radio host
- Organization: WFYI-FM
- Spouse: Rob MacPherson

Steven Stolen is a radio show host for WFYI, a voice artist, an educator, a nonprofit leader, and an activist from Indianapolis. In 2014, Stolen and his husband, Rob MacPherson, joined an ACLU lawsuit to challenge Indiana's law against same-sex marriage.

== Career ==
Stolen worked as a professor of music at Butler University in the 1990s. Then in 2001, Stolen served as the Chair of the Jordan College of Fine Arts. After these roles, Stolen moved to an administration position and served as an executive director that oversaw fundraising at the university. This work has contributed to Stolen's reputation in the community as a nonprofit leader. Following his work at Butler, Stolen acquired positions as director of the Indianapolis Children's Choir and then of the Indiana Repertory Theatre, a position he held from 2006 to 2013. The following year he began a one-year term as a regional director of a charter school network, Rocketship Education. The network aimed to open eight schools in the Indiana. In 2015 he became the vice president of corporate advancement for the Indy Chamber.

Stolen was hired as the CEO of the Indianapolis Humane Society on June 1, 2017. He was fired from his role a year later.

In addition to his work as a nonprofit leader, Stolen performs as a tenor and has hosted radio shows for WFYI, including Opera Matinee and Stolen Moments. The radio show, Stolen Moments, was named for Stolen as a pun on the song "Stolen Moments" by Oliver Nelson.

Stolen's performances as a singer include solo works and chamber music. In 2002 he founded the Meridian Song Project which performed in residence at Trinity Episcopal Church.

== Personal life ==
Stolen grew up in Mason City, Iowa. He attended Simpson College and the University of Michigan.

In 2008 Stolen married his husband, Rob MacPherson, in California. They have a daughter.

Stolen is a baseball fan.
