= Cat Protection Society of NSW =

Cat shelter in Sydney, Australia

- Formation: 1958
- Purpose: animal protection
- Headquarters: Newtown, NSW
- Origins: Reducing the number of stray cats by desexing and finding responsible homes for street cats
- Region served: New South Wales
- Services: Cat adoptions, feline care services
- President: Nita Harvey
- Affiliations: Member of International Society of Feline Medicine, society affiliate member of the International Society for Anthrozoology
- Expenses: $3m AUD per annum
- Staff: 18
- Volunteers: 150+
- Website: catprotection.org.au

The Cat Protection Society of NSW is a not-for-profit charity operating in Newtown, New South Wales. The Society was created in 1958 as a means of reducing the street cat population through neutering and adoption. Their vision is "that every cat has a loving and responsible home".

== Activities ==
In response to a feline panleukopenia outbreak in 2017, the Cat Protection Society of NSW subsidized free vaccinations for cat owners in Sydney.

=== Feral cats ===
In 2023 in response to a proposed plan by Tanya Plibersek, Australia's Minister for the Environment and Water to aggressively reduce feral cats in the country, Cats Protection issued a statement urging to "declare peace on the environment rather than a 'war' on feral cats". They warned that the minister risked creating a "moral panic" about cats and "demonising a single species".

== See also ==
- Cat Society Hong Kong
