= Animal welfare and rights in Malaysia =

Treatment of and laws concerning non-human animals in Malaysia

Animal welfare and rights in Malaysia is about the laws concerning and treatment of non-human animals in Malaysia. Malaysia has had a national animal welfare law since 1953, though it was criticized for being weak and under-enforced. In 2015, Malaysia passed an updated animal welfare law strengthening protections for animals and penalties for animal cruelty. Animal protection efforts in Malaysia appear to be exclusively welfare-driven rather than rights-driven.

== Legislation ==
=== Provisions ===
Malaysia's Animals Act of 1953 (AA) is the country's major piece of animal welfare legislation. Under the AA, a person commits an offense of animal cruelty if they “cruelly beats, kicks, ill-treats, overrides, overdrives, overloads, tortures, infuriates or terrifies any animal." Specific offenses include failing to supply sufficient food or water to an animal in confinement or transport; confining an animal in a way that causes unnecessary suffering; fighting or baiting animals; using an unfit animal for work or labor; and killing, poising, maiming, or rendering useless an animal. In conclusion, it is prohibited based on animal rights of existence.

The Malaysian Penal Code distinguishes between animals worth at least RM5, and those worth at least RM25; penalties for cruelty against the latter group are heavier, indicating the protection of animals as property as one of the goals of Malaysian anti-cruelty statutes.

In 2015, following calls from animal protectionists for stronger animal welfare legislation, Malaysia passed a new Animal Welfare Act (AWA). The AWA establishes an animal welfare board to the monitor work of animal protection associations; requires licenses for all individuals and businesses that use animals; prohibits breeding animals for research or teaching; bans the shooting of stray dogs; and grants courts the power to disqualify or deprive any owner or licensee from owning an animal indefinitely. The AWA also increases the penalty for cruelty from the AA's maximum of a RM200 fine and/or up to 6 months imprisonment, to a fine between RM20,000 and RM100,000 and/or up to 3 years in prison.

In 2014 (before the passage of the AWA), Malaysia received a C out of possible grades A, B, C, D, E, F, G on World Animal Protection's Animal Protection Index. It was again given a C grade in their 2020 rankings.

=== Enforcement ===
Penalties for cruelty towards animals have historically been very mild.

- In 2005, when a dog suffered such neglect that it had to be euthanized, its owner was fined RM100.
- In 2011, a woman who tortured and stomped kittens to death was fined RM400.
- In 2012, a person who poured boiling water on a stray dog was fined RM200.
- In another 2012 incident, the owners of a cat hotel left 150 cats unattended long enough that they suffered severe starvation and dehydration. They were charged RM6000 for 30 counts of cruelty and neglect and given 3 months in prison. This was the first time an animal cruelty case had reached the Malaysian High Court and the first time a sentence of more than a few days in prison had been given for an animal cruelty conviction.
- In 2013, a woman was sentenced to one year in prison for killing her employer's dog.

According to SEE (2013), "These cases more or less sum up the history of animal cruelty prosecution in Malaysia." There were also an additional four animal cruelty prosecutions between 2006 and 2010.

Since the passage of the Animal Welfare Act 2015, enforcement has been poor. The public can make complaints about violations of the Act to the Department of Veterinary Services but despite over 7000 reports of abuses, crimes against animals remain rampant and convictions are rare.

- In November 2024, a cleaner was arrested for beating a mother dog and her puppies to death at a school. He was released as the Attorney-General's Chambers declined to press charges

== Animals used for food ==
Malaysian meat consumption is rising steadily. Between 1981 and 2015, consumption of cow rose from 23,000 metric tons to 250,000. Between 1996 and 2015, consumption of poultry rose from 666,000 metric tons to 1.59 million.

Ruminant, poultry meat, and egg production have risen rapidly in recent years (though pork production has fallen). However, animal product production is not growing fast enough to meet the increasing demand, and the government has implemented strategies to expand the livestock industry.

== Organizations ==
Malaysian animal welfare organizations include the Sarawak Society for the Prevention of Cruelty to Animals (formed 1959), the Selangor Society for the Prevention of Cruelty to Animals (formed 1958), and the Malaysian National Animal Welfare Foundation (formed 1998). These organizations do not appear to oppose human use of animals, but work to ensure their humane treatment, focusing largely on the welfare of pets and strays.

== See also ==
- Abolitionism (animal rights)
- Animal protectionism
- Animal rights movement
- Intensive animal farming
- Animal testing
