= Hope for Paws =

US nonprofit organization

- Industry: Non-profit
- Founded: 2008
- Headquarters: Los Angeles
- Area served: United States
- Services: Animal rescue
- Revenue: 8,625,654 United States dollar (2022)
- Total assets: 6,794,995 United States dollar (2022)
- Website: www.hopeforpaws.org

Hope for Paws is a 501(c)(3) non-profit animal rescue group based in Los Angeles, California. Founded by Eldad and Audrey Hagar in 2008, Hope for Paws rescues animals facing death or danger through abuse or abandonment. They pay for veterinary costs, working with other animal-welfare organizations to find permanent placements for the animals they rescue.

The organization raises awareness and funding by filming rescue missions and publicizing recoveries of sick animals in their care. With 1.5 billion views on YouTube, and 5 million subscribers, as of 2021 it is estimated that they earn $100,000 per year through videos, in addition to what they receive via donations.
