= Hong Kong Dog Rescue =

Hong Kong Dog Rescue (HKDR)
- 救狗之家
- Abbreviation: HKDR
- Formation: 2003; 23 years ago
- Founder: Sally Andersen
- Founded at: Hong Kong
- Type: Charity
- Purpose: Animal welfare
- Headquarters: Shop 4, G/F, Cheong Yue Mansion, 13-19 North Street, Kennedy Town, Hong Kong
- Location: Hong Kong
- Website: Official website

Hong Kong Dog Rescue
- Traditional Chinese: 救狗之家
Transcriptions

The Hong Kong Dog Rescue (HKDR; Chinese: 救狗之家) is a registered charity in Hong Kong established in 2003 by Sally Andersen. The founding purpose is to save dogs and puppies from the Hong Kong Government's Agriculture, Fisheries and Conservation Department (AFCD) Animal Management Centers, where at that time thousands of dogs and puppies were killed every year.

In 2023, most of the dogs and puppies in HKDR come from different sources, and very few from AFCD. HKDR has rescued, cared for and re-homed more than 10,000 dogs and puppies.

== No Kill Organization ==
HKDR is a no kill organization, meaning no dog under its care will be euthanized for any reason other than when it is the only humane option.

== Animal welfare programs ==
=== Adoption & re-homing ===
In 2023, HKDR has more than 600 dogs waiting for adoption. They also offer post-adoption support.

=== Education & training ===
The organization hosted workshops and online seminars on a variety of subjects regularly, which are designed to help improve dog-human understanding and so reduce the number of pets being abandoned.

HKDR also runs monthly ‘Positive Partners’ Training Courses, which are designed to promote responsible pet ownership as well as reward-based training methods.

=== Fostering and volunteering ===
Look for foster parents for puppies and dogs to recover from surgery or illness. Short-term foster homes help HKDR monitor the health or assess the character of the dogs in waiting and for the dogs to adjust to home life.

Registered volunteer or dog-walker will need to attend a 3-hour orientation and subsequently serve a supervised first shift at the homing center of their choice.

HKDR encourages groups to volunteer at their Homing Centers. They provide various volunteering activities including dog-walking, general maintenance and cleaning, fundraising to education.
