= Bir Bara Ban Wildlife Sanctuary =

Bir Bara Van Wildlife Sanctuary
- Location in Haryana, India Bir Bara Van Wildlife Sanctuary (India)
- Coordinates: 29°17′30″N 76°16′51″E
- Country: India
- State: Haryana
- District: Jind district
- Notified: 11 October 2007
- Elevation: 300 m (980 ft)

Languages
- Time zone: UTC+5:30 (IST)
- ISO 3166 code: IN-HR
- Website: website

Bir Bara Ban Wildlife Sanctuary is situated 5 km away from Jind on Jind-hansi Road in Haryana State, India. It is spread over an area of 419.26 hectares.

Here you can find various species of animal and birds and reptiles such as rhesus monkey, jackal, wild dogs, wild cows, neel cows, badger, wild cats in list of animals and humming bird, peacock, hornbill, Eagle, kites and many other species of birds.

== Location ==
It is 5 km away from Jind, 40 km from Hansi, 70 km from Hisar, 73 km from Panipat, 80 km from Bhiwani, 110 km from Kurukshetra, 144 km from Delhi and 190 km from Chandigarh.

== History ==
Haryana govt notified this area as sanctuary on 11 October 2007.
