= Winslow Farm =

Animal sanctuary in Massachusetts

Coordinates: 41°56′8.9″N 71°9′52.4″W

Winslow Farm is a nonprofit animal sanctuary located in Norton, Massachusetts, USA. It is home to about 300 animals that have been abandoned or neglected. These animals include horses, sheep, llamas, alpacas, goats, peacocks, chickens, ducks, geese, donkeys, mules, pheasants, cats, dogs, and emus. It is accredited by the Global Federation of Animal Sanctuaries.

== Mission ==
Winslow Farm operates under three goals:

1. Rescue and rehabilitate mistreated and abandoned animals
2. Promote the prevention of animal mistreatment through educational programs and events
3. Advocate the preservation of the wildlife habitat

In order to achieve the funding for these goals, Winslow Farm has maintained a presence in the local and regional media. It has received news coverage by local newspapers such as The Taunton Gazette and The Sun Chronicle. It has also received regional media attention from The Boston Globe newspaper and WCVB-TV news.

== History ==
Winslow Farm opened its doors to the public in the fall of 1997. At this time, it had a total of 183 animals.

Prior to becoming an animal sanctuary, Winslow Farm was 5 acres of wooded farmland. The sanctuary's founder, Debra White, bought the land and constructed barns and sheds designed to shelter animals. By 1996, most of the structures were complete. The animals that she collected were what she considered to be "the worst down-and-outers" from farm auctions.

== Facilities ==
The Winslow Farm facilities are located on wooded farmland. Existing structures have been constructed based on simple post-and-beam architecture. Pens for the larger animals are enclosed by split-rail fences, although many of the animals at Winslow Farm are allowed to venture outside of their enclosures. The grounds are unpaved and for the most part coexist with the natural environment. Naturally-growing trees dot the landscape and can be found both on pedestrian paths and within enclosures.

Winslow Farm is currently one of two research sites (the other being Whispering Pines Farm in Foxboro, MA) where faculty and students from Wheaton College conduct research on the effectiveness of clicker training.
