= Little RES Q =

- Abbreviation: resq
- Formation: 2008
- Type: Animal welfare organization
- Legal status: Active
- Purpose: Rescue, educator and network
- Headquarters: Toronto, Ontario
- Region served: Ontario, Canada
- Official language: English
- Leader: Marc Ouellette
- Staff: 3
- Website: Little RES Q

Little RES Q is Ontario's first CRA registered charity dedicated to the rescue, rehabilitation and relocation of pet turtles in an attempt to keep them from being released into the wild. The rescue also takes on snakes, bearded dragons, and other reptiles to help them find forever homes.

== History ==
Founded in 2008 by Marc Ouellette, the rescue started as a dedicated aquatic turtle shelter in Toronto, Ontario and has since grown to have locations across Ontario and Quebec and now accepts in most legal reptiles as space permits.

== See also ==
- Ontario Society for the Prevention of Cruelty to Animals
