= Vets for Change =

- Founded: 2012
- Founder: Carl Salter
- Purpose: Animal Welfare
- Location: Cheltenham, Gloucestershire, England
- Region served: United Kingdom; Europe; Worldwide
- Method: Veterinary Care
- Key people: Carl Salter, Christina Howell, Dr Nina Kisch
- Revenue: £.025m (2014)
- Volunteers: 3
- Website: vetsforchange.com

Vets for Change is a fully registered UK charitable organisation that was set up to provide financial and logistical support to community animal welfare projects around the world.

== History ==
Vets for Change was founded in 2012 and expanded in 2013 to run a mass rabies vaccination and sterilisation campaign in South Africa. In 2014, Vets for Change successfully completed mass sterilisation and vaccination projects in Mpumalanga and Limpopo and have since been approached for help running further projects in Kuching, Borneo and to return to Mpumalanga in 2015. Vets for Change became a fully UK registered charity in May 2015 and has since run two more mass canine rabies vaccination campaigns in South Africa.

== See also ==
- Animal ethics
- Animal rights
- Cruelty to animals
