= Coastal Pet Rescue =

Non-profit organization

Coastal Pet Rescue's logo.

Coastal Pet Rescue (CPR) is a 501(c)(3) non-profit organization animal rescue in the coastal areas of Georgia, South Carolina and Florida. As an all-volunteer organization, its goals include pet rescue, reducing pet overpopulation through spaying/neutering, and promoting better pet guardianship.

== History ==
Coastal Pet Rescue was founded in Savannah, Georgia, on February 5, 2003, by Lisa Scarbrough. Scarbrough had been rescuing and placing pets on her own for two years when she decided to formalize her rescue effort. Today, Coastal Pet Rescue employs a non-paid executive committee of five that oversee nearly 60 active volunteers.

== Awards and recognition ==
In 2005, the organization received recognition for its work several times. In February, the Savannah Morning News ran a featured article about Coastal Pet Rescue and its founder, Lisa Scarbrough. The reporter noted the rescue's biggest case at the time. Jackie, a female Weimaraner, had been hit by a semi truck and then left abandoned in an apartment for two weeks without any care. Coastal Pet Rescue took her and her companion, a male Weimaraner they dubbed "Colby" after the runner-up in the second season of Survivor, in to their care. Lacking proper funds for Jackie's much needed orthopedic care, the organization appealed to the public and raised over the needed amount. The story caught the eye of a local Lexus and Toyota dealership's general manager, who offered to support the agency through donations for each purchase of vehicles from two lots through one month. This led to their appearance in Time magazine in August as the dealership was rewarded with the Toyota President's Award for their community support.

Using the funds garnered from the dealership's support, Coastal Pet Rescue purchased and donated manikins and supplies in May to the Savannah Chapter of the American Red Cross so that pet first aid and CPR classes could be offered in the area. Continually striving to provide resources and support for animals in the community, the organization launched a trap-neuter-return program for feral cats in July. Dubbed The Milton Project, the program seeks to control the overpopulation of feral colonies around the Savannah area. Program coordinator Mandy Ownley works with a local vet to provide low-cost spays/neuters and rabies vaccinations to the cats and kittens that are trapped. Those that are young enough to be socialized are placed for adoption.

Looking to increase their humane education in the area, Coastal Pet Rescue launched its CPR Teens program in August. CPR Teens is a teen volunteer initiative to educate teens on the proper care for animals and deter tendencies towards animal cruelty.

In September, founder Lisa Scarbrough was recognized nationally for her dedication to homeless pets. Jiffy Lube named her its national Hearts on Wheels winner. Lisa was flown to New York to appear on morning talk and radio shows around the nation. Afterwards, she was treated to an afternoon with the ASPCA, including time with Annemarie Lucas, notable from Animal Planet's Animal Precinct. Also that month, Lisa was granted a scholarship from Humane Society University towards her bachelor of science in humane leadership program from Duquesne University.

Rounding out a month of awards, the story of Jackie was featured in the very first worldwide edition of Celebrate Animals. Celebrate Animals is a newsletter produced by Smarter than Jack, which features news of animal rescues.

Back home, the group collaborated with SPOT (Stopping Pet Overpopulation Together), an agency out of Atlanta, Georgia, to organize a two-day mobile spay/neuter clinic in Savannah. The group serviced 22 cats and several dogs. Founder Lisa Scarbrough was recognized for her local work as a finalist for the Humane Society of Chatham-Savannah's Maggy Medallion.

In October, Purina named Coastal Pet Rescue to its Purina Pro Plan Rally to Rescue Ambassador program. The group was only one of three in Georgia selected. Purina provided event materials, including its own 10x10 tent, curb signs and fundraising items as well as packages for adopters.

December found the organization on CNN.com in a segment focusing on how the Internet has changed people's lives. Lisa's hometown publication, the Tybee Breeze, also ran a three-page article about the success of the organization for the last year.

The group was propelled to national attention again in 2006 with recognition by Purina. Rally to Rescue chose to honor ten of its over 500 ambassadors in May in Washington, DC, one of which was Coastal Pet Rescue. The honorees received an Award of Excellence from Purina, special recognition from the United States Department of Agriculture, and had flags flown over the capital in their honor. Sex in the City actress Kristin Davis gave the address at the National Press Room.

Coastal Pet Rescue founder and president Lisa Scarbrough received additional recognition in July as she was named to the REAL Hot 100 list. The REAL hot 100 is a list featuring young women from around the country who are breaking barriers, fighting stereotypes, and making a difference in their communities or the nation. Lisa Scarbrough was included for her dedication and contributions to Coastal Pet Rescue.

== Organizational structure ==
Current executive board:

- Lisa Scarbrough, president/founder
- Wendy Owens, special events coordinator
- Michelle Still, animal management coordinator
- Heather Erwin, secretary
