= Humane League of Lancaster County =

Coordinates: 40.028058°N 76.223981°W

Maud Haldeman (right), founder

The Humane League of Lancaster County was founded in 1917 to "prevent animals from becoming homeless through providing services and education to help people understand how to provide responsible lifetime care to their animals". It is based in Lancaster County, Pennsylvania, in the United States.

== Early history ==
On May 3, 1917, Miss Maud Haldeman (1874–1931), along with seventeen other women, formed the Woman's Humane League of Lancaster County, Pennsylvania. The organization's stated purpose was as follows:

This corporation is founded for the prevention of cruelty to, and care of, children, girls, aged persons, and animals within the Commonwealth of Pennsylvania, and to enforce all laws enacted by the Pennsylvania legislature or by Congress for the protection of the children, girls, aged persons and animals

As social service agencies began to address the problems of woman and children, the League turned its attention exclusively to animal welfare. Although for 20 years complaints were investigated and resolved, no shelter was available for homeless animals until 1937, when animals were temporarily housed in kennels, fairgrounds and other locations in the area.. A "Men's Advisory Committee" was formed in 1946 to assist the ladies, and soon thereafter, in 1947, the word "Woman's" was omitted from the name and formally changed to The Humane League of Lancaster County.

Since April 2006, Franklin and Marshall College, Archives & Special Collections, Shadek-Fackenthal Library, has been the official custodian of the records of the Woman's Humane League of Lancaster County.

== Today ==
2007 marked the 90th anniversary of the Humane League of Lancaster County, which is located today on Lincoln Highway East, Lancaster, Pennsylvania, with 30 staff members and over 150 volunteers. Maud Haldeman died in 1931 and bequeathed her estate to the Humane League of Lancaster County (unofficially estimated at over $200,000, or $4.14 million in 2024 dollars). Her legacy has been honored through the formation of the Maud Haldeman Society, a group of individuals who have included the Humane League in their estate planning through bequests or beneficiary designations.

In June of 2020, Karel Minor, the CEO of Humane League of Lancaster County, posted on Facebook "She's got her knee on life's neck like it's a minority in Minnesota, That's probably too soon", making light of the murder of George Floyd which had occurred weeks prior. Minor resigned as director of the Owen J. Roberts School Board but remains CEO of Humane League.

== Feral cat policy ==
Beginning September 1, 2008, the Humane League adopted a "trap–neuter–return" policy and will no longer accept feral cats for euthanasia. Instead, interested parties are asked to schedule an appointment to have the cat spayed or neutered for a minimal fee. Traps are available for rental from the League. A trapped cat may be brought to the scheduled appointment, picked up post-surgery and returned to the wild.
