= Pakistan Animal Welfare Society =

Animal welfare organization in Pakistan

Pakistan Animal Welfare Society (PAWS)
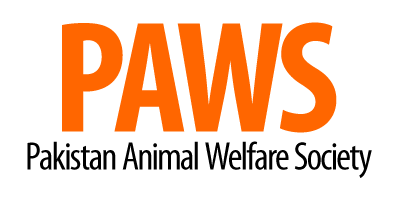
- Founded: 2004
- Founder: Maheen Zia and Mahera Omar
- Purpose: Animal welfare
- Location: Karachi, Pakistan
- Members: Fatima Zehra Shah
- Website: pawspakistan.org

PAWS (Pakistan Animal Welfare Society) is a non profit organization registered as a company limited founded in 2004. It is run by volunteers, without having a specific shelter, business venue or paid staff located in Karachi, Pakistan. All funds raised go directly towards rescuing and treating animals as well as awareness raising and advocacy work. PAWS accounts are audited annually by chartered accountants Salman Masud and Co.

PAWS aims to create a more just and equitable relationship between humans and animals in Pakistan.

It aims to make humans feel a responsibility towards their environment and fellow species and to protect and preserve animal populations; their integrity, diversity, welfare and well-being. The organization and its members believe that the natural environment is a shared heritage for humankind and they seek to create, promote and preserve ecologically sustainable relationships globally.

It has received recognition in Karachi at a small, yet successful scale. Media covers have been done by Geo News show Voice Of America, The News Us magazine for the youth and regular articles in the Dawn News promote the cause. Other cable shows such as "My pet and I"; a show aired on Style 360, also supports the cause. PAWS carries out animal rescues, adoptions and treatments. It encourages the volunteers to practice charity at home and to donate to the organization.

Few vets exist in the country and most of them have not received proper medical education in the field. Hospitals for animals are rare as most animals are treated ruthlessly except for animals required on farms and needed to keep in shape. The organization is also supported by Edhi centers which collect homeless cats and dogs or injured animals to give them shelter. PAWS is currently limited to recognition in Pakistan. With more recognition from foreign organizations PAWS can expand to more areas of Pakistan, being able to save the wildlife species nearing extinction due to pollution, excessive hunting, primitive methods of feeding, expansion of land and ignorance about the importance of animals.

== See also ==
- Animal welfare
- Animal rights
- Animal protection
