= Action for Dolphins =

Animal welfare charity

- Formation: 2012
- Type: Charity
- Purpose: Protection and welfare of dolphins and other small cetaceans
- Location(s): Australia; United Kingdom
- CEO: Sarah Lucas
- Website: Official website

Action for Dolphins (AFD), formerly known as 'Australia for Dolphins', is an animal welfare charity committed to achieving international protection for small cetaceans (dolphins and other small whales). The organisation aims to end dolphin hunting and captivity.

AFD was founded by CEO Sarah Lucas in 2012, after she made a life-changing journey to the Japanese town of Taiji to observe the world's largest dolphin drive hunts.

Lucas returned to Taiji with Channel Nine's 60 Minutes film crew in January 2014 to make the documentary The Killing Cove, which aired on February 21, 2014. Produced by Phil Goyen and presented by Liz Hayes, the segment documented the drive hunts, including the capture of a rare albino dolphin calf named Angel.

== Action for Angel lawsuit ==
In January 2014, Angel the albino dolphin calf was captured in the Taiji drive hunts in Japan and sent to the Taiji Whale Museum. A month later, Sarah Lucas and other dolphin advocates attempted to enter the museum to check on Angel's well-being, but they were refused entry.

In May 2014, AFD filed legal action against the Taiji government in the Wakayama District Court. The Action for Angel lawsuit asserted that, as the owner and operator of the whale museum, the town of Taiji was illegally refusing entry to law-abiding people based on their appearance. AFD argued the conduct by the museum was contrary to Japan's Constitution, which states ‘there shall be no discrimination in political, economic or social relations because of race'.

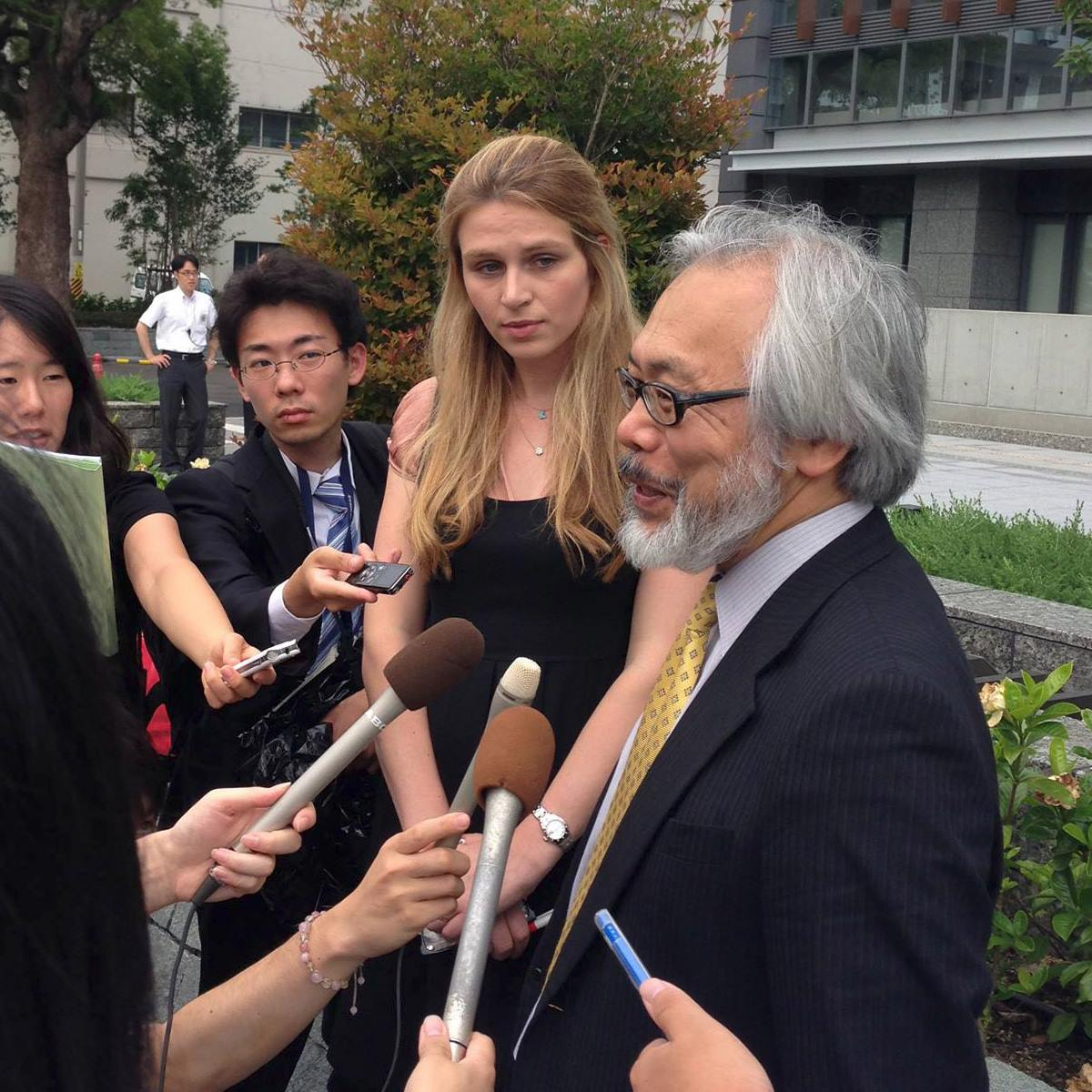
AFD's Sarah Lucas and attorney Takashi Takano talk to journalists outside court.

In November 2015, Sarah Lucas took the stand in Wakayama District Court and gave evidence against the Taiji Whale Museum. In March 2016, the judges ruled in AFD's favour. Following the lawsuit animal welfare observers have now been granted access to the museum.

== Legal action against WAZA ==
In March 2015, AFD launched a global campaign and legal action against the World Association of Zoos and Aquariums (WAZA) in Switzerland. The legal action argued WAZA should stop endorsing members involved in dolphin hunting and other acts of animal cruelty, as this endorsement contradicted the association's code of ethics. Within a month of the campaign launch, AFD's petition mobilised tens of thousands of people worldwide. As a result, WAZA suspended the membership of its Japanese member, the Japanese Association of Zoos and Aquariums (JAZA), which allowed member aquariums to purchase dolphins from the Taiji drive hunts. A few weeks later, all Japanese aquariums in the WAZA network agreed to stop purchasing dolphins from the Taiji hunts.

Of the decision, Sarah Lucas told The Guardian, "This momentous decision marks the beginning of the end for dolphin hunting in Japan. The capture of live dolphins, which sell for up to $100,000, is the motivation for the brutal dolphin hunts in Taiji. This decision, which stops Japanese aquariums demanding more Taiji dolphins, is a huge blow to the hunts. JAZA aquariums provide up to 40% of total demand for live dolphins from Taiji. So, as of today, the market for Taiji dolphins could be nearly cut in half. Without demand, the hunts won’t continue. It is the first major step towards ending the Taiji dolphin hunts once and for all.”

The Sydney Morning Herald reported that the legal action was able to "knock the wind out of Japan's dolphin hunt".

== Legal action against Dolphin Marine Magic ==
In April 2017 AFD launched legal action against Dolphin Marine Magic, a marine park in New South Wales, Australia, which features regular performances from captive dolphins. The lawsuit was filed in the Federal Circuit Court of Australia by AFD and the Animal Law Institute, and alleged Dolphin Marine Magic made misleading and deceptive statements by claiming their dolphins are "happy and healthy".

Malcolm Caulfield, Principal Lawyer at the Animal Law Institute, stated: “Dolphin Marine Magic continues to claim on its website that the animals that they care for are happy and healthy - this includes the five dolphins currently at the park. We say that this claim is misleading as dolphins in captivity suffer stress, behavioural abnormalities, high mortality rates, decreased longevity, breeding problems and their welfare is generally compromised in artificial captive environments.”

The lawsuit also alleges statements made by Dolphin Marine Magic claiming rehabilitation is "at the heart" of everything it does are misleading, as rehabilitation does not make up the majority of the respondent’s activities at the marine park.

The lawsuit was reported by Channel 10's The Project, in which Action for Dolphins' Advocacy Director Jordan Sosnowski stated, "This will send a very loud warning bell to big marine parks like Sea World. It will also set a precedent, which we hope will bolster global efforts to end dolphin captivity and help convince politicians this cruel practice has to end."

== Advocacy ==
AFD has launched numerous campaigns in order to raise public awareness of cruelty against dolphins and whales.

=== Taiji dolphins billboards ===
Despite the dolphin drive hunts taking place yearly in Taiji, many Japanese people are unaware that this is happening. To raise further awareness, AFD launched a billboard in Osaka, Japan, in March 2017, exposing thousands of people graphic footage of the Taiji dolphin hunts for the first time.

They launched a second billboard in Tokyo in September 2017.

=== Bus billboards and Coffs Harbour advocacy campaign ===
In March 2016 Action for Dolphins launched a series of bus billboards in the town of Coffs Harbour, NSW, encouraging people to 'think twice' before supporting dolphin captivity. "It's the beginning of a national advocacy campaign and the start of a push to end dolphin captivity in NSW," Sarah Lucas, told The Australian. "They'll be seen by thousands of people in the peak tourism season and encourage them not to support cruel dolphin captivity."

The billboards preceded a larger AFD advocacy campaign against dolphin captivity in the Coffs Harbour region, which included radio advertisements, standing billboards, leaflet distribution, and a school advocacy program.

== See also ==
- Animal welfare and rights in Australia
