= Friends of Indianapolis Animal Care & Control =

US non-profit organization

- Location: Indianapolis, Indiana
- Key people: Tim Haley, President
- Website: friendsofindyanimals.org

Friend of Indianapolis Animal Care & Control is a non-profit organization based in Indianapolis, Indiana, that is dedicated to improving animal welfare by supporting the work of Indianapolis Animal Care & Control.

== History ==
Friends of Indianapolis Animal Care & Control was founded by a group of volunteers and leaders from Indianapolis Animal Care & Control, which is the city agency that deals with animal overpopulation in the Indianapolis area. Their services include collecting stray and injured animals, holding lost animals for owner retrieval, inspecting crimes related to animal ownership or breeding, and education on pet overpopulation issues.

== Events ==
Every year, the organization holds a fundraising event called "The Island Boy Comfort Fund", which raises money to buy supplies for animal shelter dog beds. The fundraiser was inspired by founding member Mike Shinn's dog Island Boy, who succumbed to bone cancer in 2008. The design for the elevated dog beds was produced by the Columbus Dog Connection. In January 2012, the organization finalized a donation from TeNaj McFadden for $60,000, which will be used to provide salaries for three new positions at Indianapolis Animal Care & Control.
