= Prairie Wildlife Rehabilitation Centre =

Canadian organization

- Formation: 2007
- Type: wildlife rehabilitation organization
- Legal status: active
- Headquarters: Winnipeg, Manitoba
- Region served: Winnipeg, Manitoba, Canada
- Official language: English; French
- Website: pwildlife.ca

Founded in 2007, Prairie Wildlife Rehabilitation Centre is a wildlife rehabilitation organization based out of Winnipeg, Manitoba, Canada. The main goal of the organization "is to treat injured and orphaned wildlife and to successfully release them back into their natural habitat." In addition to wildlife rehabilitation the organization is also known to operate interpretive displays and give educational presentations.
