= Vancouver Orphan Kitten Rescue Association =

Canadian non-profit organization

- Founded: 2000
- Type: Non-profit organization, charitable organization
- Purpose: Cat rescue, trap-neuter-return
- Location: Vancouver, British Columbia, Canada
- Region served: Lower Mainland
- Key people: Michael Sheldrake, Chair; Maria Soroski, Vice Chair
- Revenue: $743,890 (2018)
- Employees: None
- Volunteers: 400 (2026)
- Website: www.vokra.ca

The Vancouver Orphan Kitten Rescue Association (VOKRA) is a no kill, non-profit cat rescue organization in Vancouver, British Columbia, Canada, providing trap–neuter–return services to Vancouver and nearby communities.

== History ==
In 2000, Karen Duncan and Maria Soroski founded the Vancouver Orphan Kitten Rescue Association (VOKRA) in Vancouver, British Columbia. They first planned to care for very young, mainly bottle-feeding kittens, who rarely survived if found without a mother cat. They soon found that older kittens would do better in foster care, and then included mother cats, both tame and feral, and eventually a full trap-neuter-return program. Initially the organization helped about 150 cats and kittens each year.

In 2008, the organization expanded into Surrey; more than half of the incoming cats were from the Surrey area in 2013.

By 2014, the organization had grown to over 350 foster homes, helping 1,800 cats annually. In March 2014, the organization opened a new 3,200 square foot (297 sq. m.) operations centre in East Vancouver, British Columbia. The facility contains four pods, each with its own air supply to prevent disease from spreading. The centre can handle up to 50 cats for short stays of usually one to three days, before the cats go to foster care. The centre is also used for recovery of feral cats after their spay/neuter surgery.

== Programs ==
=== Pre-natal, natal, and orphan program ===
VOKRA specializes in the care of bottle-feeding kittens who are orphaned or whose mother cannot feed them adequately. The organization also provides care for pregnant and nursing cats, both tame and feral. The work can be intense: "in the case of sick or bottle-fed young ones, feeding and care can be needed every two hours, around the clock."

=== Foster program ===
Without a shelter, foster homes provide the foundation of VOKRA's work. VOKRA says that one of the advantages of fostering is "to protect the very young from colds, distemper, parasites and other transmissible illnesses."

The organization provides all food, supplies, equipment and pays for the medical needs of the cats and kittens being fostered. The busiest time of year is between April and October, but foster homes are used year-round. The space used for fostering is typically a spare room or bathroom, where the foster kittens/cats can be isolated from the family's own animals for at least for a week to ten days, to prevent the spread of illnesses to the family's own cats. The length of time the foster charges will stay depends on how soon they are ready for adoption, and how long it takes to find the right adopter; it "can vary from as little as a week to several months. We will move them to another foster home if necessary." Foster parents report enjoying the experience of raising kittens, and sometimes deciding to adopt their fosters.

=== Trap-neuter-return program ===
VOKRA works to stabilize and reduce the feral cat population by trap–neuter–return, with partner organizations including the Pacific Animal Foundation and Katie's Place Animal Shelter. Soroski said they had "virtually eliminated feral cat colonies in Vancouver and Burnaby", and hope to do the same in Surrey. Volunteers in 2014 estimated there are 20,000 feral cats in Surrey.

Care provided to feral cats includes caring for pregnant feral mothers through birthing and until their kittens are weaned. If a mother cat cannot be tamed, she is returned to her original location where volunteers ensure food and water are available daily, and the cat's health can be monitored. Feral Kittens and tame strays are not returned, but are instead socialized in foster care and adopted out to homes. VOKRA does not ear-tip feral cats, but each cat receives an identification tattoo.

=== Spay-neuter assistance program ===
The organization assists low income individuals and families with the cost of spaying and neutering their cats. In 2013, VOKRA sterilized 120 free-roaming cats in the Whalley neighbourhood of Surrey, with a grant from PetSmart Charities. In 2014, the organization received a grant to help low income cat guardians in the Newton neighbourhood of Surrey.

=== Outreach to other communities ===
In 2012, VOKRA decided to help five cats from Avsallar, Turkey, after hearing about the plight of street cats. Two of the cats have been adopted: Fistik, calico cat who had suffered broken legs and a broken pelvis before being rescued by a vet in Antalya, Turkey; and tuxedo cat Ballerina, who also suffered a leg injury before being rescued by a vet in Avsallar.

VOKRA sometimes takes in cats from northern communities. In March 2012, Hamish, an orange and white tabby cat with medium-length hair, was rescued by Northern Animal Rescue Alliance after he had been surviving at the local garbage dump in Terrace, British Columbia. He was flown to Vancouver, and adopted by his foster family, who renamed him Wiggum.

In June 2014, VOKRA took in five kittens from Lethbridge, Alberta. Two of the kittens, Olivia and Daisy, have cerebellar hypoplasia (CH), a condition that causes an unsteady gait; VOKRA reported having had some success helping cats with the condition using therapeutic treatments. Pilots N Paws Canada arranged to have the cats transported to Vancouver from Purrfect Endings, a rescue in Lethbridge. Turbo and Noah, two kittens who did not have CH, were adopted quickly.

=== Fundraising ===
Since 2009, VOKRA's main fundraiser has been the annual Walk for the Kitties. Each year VOKRA nominates spokeskitties who help represent the more than 14,000 cats and kittens the no-kill organization has rescued since its founding in 2000.

== Wildlife rescue assistance ==
On occasion VOKRA has assisted with wildlife rescues. A notable rescue involved a skunk named Bubbles. In August 2011, Bubbles was noticed in Vancouver's West End with her neck stuck in a plastic dome-shaped lid used for bubble tea. The skunk's situation became more dire as she grew and the lid became tighter. Bubbles eluded captors until November 2011, when VOKRA volunteer Shirley trapped her. The Wildlife Rescue Association of B.C. performed surgery to remove debris which had caused scabbing, and after 45 days of rehabilitation, Bubbles was reported ready for release on December 28, 2011. The wildlife rescue later reported that Bubbles had been "spotted in the company of other neighbourhood skunks and appears to be healthy and staying out of trouble."

== Position statements ==
- On declawing cats: "Declawing cats is cruel, inhumane and equal to severing all human fingers from the first knuckle below the fingernail."
- On dangerous pet products: "Numerous over-the-counter 'pet products' ... are in fact harming and sometimes killing perfectly healthy cats and dogs. They contain the same pesticides that are found in Raid, and have been shown to cause severe skin burns, seizures, vomiting and death."
- On the indoor/outdoor debate: "After 13 years of cat rescue, we firmly believe that keeping your cats strictly indoors will lead to a long, healthy life for your beloved pet and fewer worrisome nights and vet bills after a cat goes missing, is injured, or even worse."

== Notable cat rescues ==
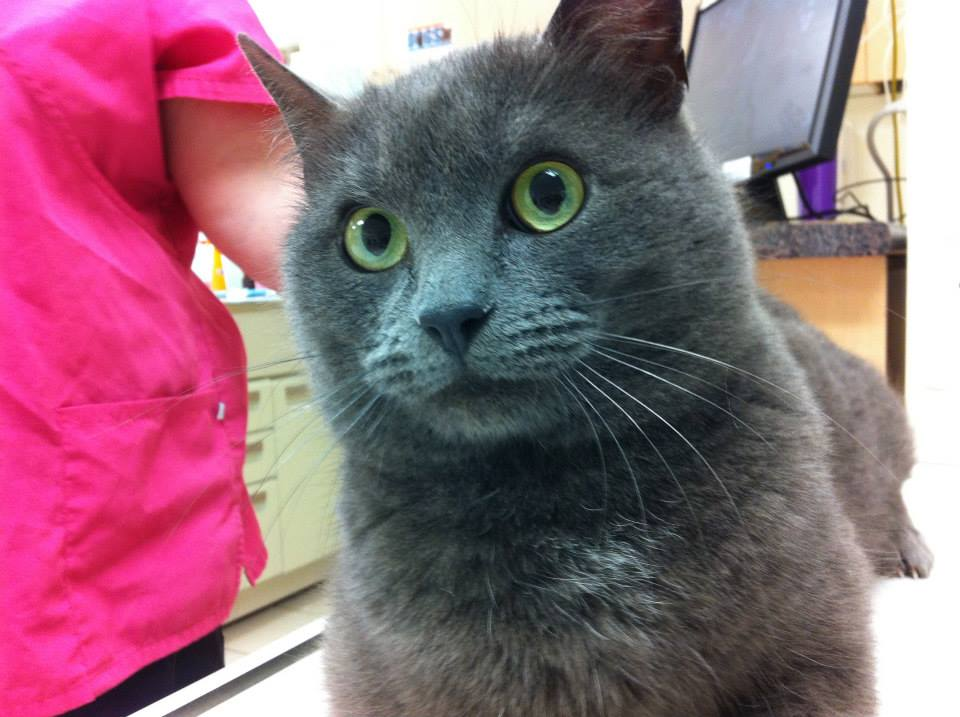
Blue gets veterinary help.

- Blue - On December 16, 2013, Blue, a Russian Blue cat with a badly infected tail was rescued when he was trapped in White Rock. Blue had lived outside for over two years, but showed himself to be completely tame after being rescued. Most of his tail was amputated at the time of his neutering surgery. Blue was soon adopted after being fostered.
- Clea and Oreo (Massage Therapy Kittens): Mary McNeil's foster kittens Chloe and Bugsy (now Clea and Oreo) were featured on The Ellen DeGeneres Show for their massage therapy technique, in a June 2012 video which has had over 15 million views. Clea, the tabby kitten therapist, also massaged a tuxedo kitten in Camera Kitten, a video with close to 400,000 views. The kittens, who were wild and fearful when first rescued, are now adopted. Their ongoing adventures are chronicled on the YouTube channel of their adopter, Elle Ekram.
- Kenny Pawgers - On August 29, 2011, Kenny Pawgers, a "skinny, old-timer with dirty, white fur and a few rotten molars, who had been living rough" was rescued in East Vancouver, after trapper Maria Soroski returned from a Kenny Rogers concert. Kenny had "tried sneaking into apartments on the East Side and sleeping in the occupants' beds, maybe hoping that they'd like him and let him stay." He was the most affectionate cat that Soroski had known. A golf-ball sized tumour was soon found and removed from his stomach. His award-winning story was the only Canadian entry in a 2011 Heartwarming Story Contest of the U.S.-based Animal Rescue Site; earning VOKRA $2,000, which went to his vet bills. Kenny attended VOKRA's annual Walk for the Kitties fundraisers at Jericho Beach in 2012 and 2013. He received ongoing homeopathy treatments for lymphoma, remaining in Soroski's care. On May 2, 2013, he died from old age at 20 years.
- Kringle - In December 2011, Kringle, an orange and white tabby cat, and his brother Pjammies, were trapped in Vancouver, British Columbia. The two cats had been abandoned from their home of many years when the family moved. Pjammies was quickly adopted, but Kringle stayed in several foster homes. At a North Vancouver foster home, PetSearchers Canada brought a tracking dog to help search when Kringle went missing for two days. Kringle was adopted from his last foster home in June 2012. His ongoing adventures are chronicled in the Facebook Page, Crazy about Cats.
- Lua - In the fall of 2013, Lua, a tabby kitten with medium length hair, suffered an injury in a crushing accident that left her back legs paralyzed. She received hydrotherapy, and regularly receives acupuncture and other therapies. Lua's foster mom Dania chronicles her ongoing adventures from Gabriola Island on her Facebook Page, Lua.
- Maxine - an affectionate tabby cat, Maxine gave birth to 10 kittens soon after being rescued in Surrey in April 2014. Nine of her kittens survived. Maxine helped to spread the word about VOKRA's low cost spay/neuter program. She was adopted after her kittens were weaned.
- Monkey and Thunder and family - Six purring grey foster kittens born to a feral mother were viewed by over 500,000 people in A Den of Kittens, a June 2012 video by foster parents Douglas and Sharon. The family adopted two of the kittens, Monkey and Thunder, who appeared in another popular video, Get a Room, Kittens. The kittens were featured on episode 8 of Animal Planet's program My Pet's Gone Viral. The family's ongoing adventures are chronicled on the YouTube channel DrNworb. Their August 2013 video The Kitten Circus, featuring five kittens they also fostered, was awarded first place in Vancouver's first Internet Cat Video Festival, and shown at the festival in August 2014.
- Monty - When found as a thin, frail elderly stray cat in New Westminster in early 2014, Monty's head and neck were riddled with plastic BB gun pellets. He is blind in one eye, which appears cloudy; believed to be likely the result of the same cruelty. Monty was also diagnosed with diabetes. In September 2014, Monty had gone from needing two units of insulin daily to one, and his diabetes was believed to be moving toward remission. His foster family decided to adopt him.

== Kitty 911 ==
In 2016, the documentary series Kitty 911 was released, following the work of VOKRA volunteers. Ten episodes were filmed in season one, from 2016 to 2017.
