= Inges Kattehjem =

Cat welfare organisation

Inges Kattehjem is Denmark's largest cat organisation. Founded in 1970, Inges Kattehjem provides new homes for more than 3,000 homeless cats every year through shelters all across Denmark.

Inges Kattehjem runs Dansk Katteregister, a database containing information about earmarked and chipped cats.
