= SPCA Selangor =

Non-profit animal shelter organization in Selangor, Malaysia

Society for the Prevention of Cruelty to Animals, Selangor
- Abbreviation: SPCA Selangor
- Formation: 1958; 68 years ago
- Founder: Ruth Spiers
- Type: NGO
- Registration no.: 1320
- Headquarters: Ampang Jaya, Selangor, Malaysia
- Region served: Klang Valley
- Services: Animal shelter
- Chairman: Christine Chin
- Website: spca.org.my

The Society for the Prevention of Cruelty to Animals, Selangor (abbreviated: SPCA Selangor) is a non-profit animal shelter in Selangor, Malaysia. The SPCA Selangor was founded by Ruth Spiers in 1958.

SPCA Selangor receives almost 1,100 animals ranging from dogs to rabbits every month. Due to shortage of space and funding, and a 10 percent adoption rate, SPCA Selangor must euthanize many animals each year. The SPCA Selangor aims to become a no-kill facility by 2010.

In addition to operating animal shelters, SPCA Selangor educates the public about responsible pet ownership, lobbies for animal protection and animal control laws, spays and neuters animals, and investigates animal cruelty complaints.

In response, these and other punishments which SPCA Selangor felt were insufficient, SPCA came up with a petition and is appealing to the courts and the law makers to increase the maximum fine of RM200 and/or six months of imprisonment under The Animal Ordinance 1953 to a fine of RM100,000.

SPCA Selangor runs a Stray Free Selangor initiative, which has Tengku Permaisuri Norashikin as a patron.

== See also ==
- Animal welfare and rights in Malaysia
