= Sky Ark =

Defunct animal assistance non-profit aviation organization

Sky Ark Inc.
- Founded: 2003 by Mickey and Cara Russell in Buena Vista, Colorado
- Type: Non-profit, Interest group, Animal Welfare
- Location: Buena Vista, Colorado, United States
- Fields: Air transport for animals and pets

Sky Ark Inc. was a non-governmental, non-profit organization that provided free air and ground transportation and airlift services to rescue groups and government agencies during natural disaster. They used volunteer pilots to fly rescue, special needs, or animals with medical issues, for free.

Sky Ark was a nonprofit organization providing free transport services for animals to rescue groups, zoos and sanctuaries needing to transport animals over long distances in the United States. They also transported the animal and humanitarian community during disasters and desperate crises.

Sky Ark was founded in April 2003 by Mickey and Cara Russell, using their own financial resources and later transitioned to being funded through various sources, including private foundations and corporate donations.

On June 28, 2016, Mickey Russell shot and killed his estranged wife, Cara Russell, and then shot and killed himself.

In 2018, their federal tax-exempt status was automatically revoked for not filing a Form 990-series return or notice for three consecutive years. As of 2023, their exempt status has not been renewed.

== See also ==
- Animal welfare
