= Marine Connection =

Animal welfare charity

Marine Connection is a London, UK-based animal welfare charity working both nationally and internationally for the welfare, protection, and conservation of cetaceans: dolphins, whales and porpoises. The charity aims to achieve its objectives via various campaigns, educational and research programmes; events and press coverage. It also encourages the general public, private companies and celebrities to become involved.

Threats to cetaceans has never been greater than they are today. These threats include such factors as bycatch, which is the painful, often drawn-out suffocation of marine mammals after having been accidentally caught in large fishing nets and pair trawlers; environmental and noise pollution of the marine environment; loss of natural habitat and food supplies often due to such modern-day problems as exploring and expanding new underwater petroleum supplies, navigation, over-fishing, climate change and global warming.

By raising public awareness to these issues concerning threats to marine life and their underwater environment, Marine Connection hopes to promote a better understanding of these problems through educational and public outreach programmes. Also, by conducting ongoing research and examining these issues now, the charity hopes to identify upcoming problems before they happen so changes can be made before it's too late to stop the destruction of the marine habitat that's already occurring at such a rapid pace.

Another example of Marine Connection's ongoing commitment to cetaceans is examining the effectiveness of current legislation and calling for stronger laws to protect the marine environment. Marine Connection seeks to actively secure a safer and therefore healthier future for all dolphins and whales as well as the oceans in which they live.

== Primary activities and goals ==
- Campaigning against dolphins and whales being caught in fishing nets
- Contributing towards the British government's legislation on marine conservation, including the Marine and Coastal Access Act 2009
- Working with the Partnership Against Wildlife Crime (PAW) on marine wildlife legislation and law enforcement
- Researching the effects of underwater noise on marine mammals
- Stopping the capture of, and trade in, wild dolphins and whales for the captivity industry
- Protecting the resident bottlenose dolphin population in the Moray Firth, Scotland
- Funding ongoing research projects in Scotland, Wales and Cornwall

== Publications ==
Marine Connection collaborates with many other animal welfare organisations to produce publications in the areas of research, conservation, and campaigning. Marine Connection worked with the Devon and Cornwall Wildlife Trusts; jointly developing and writing The South West Dolphin Campaign. A report detailing the problem of cetaceans, including dolphins and whales, being accidentally caught and dying in fishing nets, an issue also known as Bycatch.

On 17 April 2008, the Marine Connection released a new research 51-page study on the phenomenon of solitary dolphins, including Dave the Dolphin, Opo, Georges, Marra, Jet, Luna, and another 85 solitary dolphins.
