= Cochrane & Area Humane Society =

Canadian animal shelter

- Founded: 1998
- Type: non-profit charity
- Purpose: Animal welfare
- Location: Cochrane, Alberta
- Region served: Cochrane and surrounding area
- Revenue: $1.9 million in 2019
- Employees: 6 full-time, 47 part-time (2019)
- Website: cochranehumane.ca

The Cochrane & Area Humane Society is an animal shelter which holds the contract for animal services for the town of Cochrane, Alberta, and surrounding communities. It is a managed admission animal shelter which discourages surrendering a pet to the shelter.

It was founded and incorporated in 1998 and received charitable status in 1999.

In 2020, adoptions were continuing, with adjustments, during the COVID-19 pandemic.
