= Humane Society of Pinellas =

U.S. non-profit organization

The Humane Society of Pinellas is an animal shelter located in Clearwater, Florida, which houses nearly 400 animals at any given time.

== History ==
The Humane Society of Pinellas was founded in 1949, then known as the Society for the Prevention of Cruelty to Animals of Clearwater or SPCA Clearwater. In 1988, after the founding of another local animal shelter, the SPCA Clearwater changed its name to the Humane Society of North Pinellas. The shelter underwent another name change, and in 2000, officially became the Humane Society of Pinellas.

== Management ==
The Humane Society of Pinellas is governed by a Board of Directors.
