= Sarawak Society for the Prevention of Cruelty to Animals =

The Sarawak Society for the Prevention of Cruelty to Animals is a humane society in Kuching, Sarawak, Malaysia. The society operates a shelter at 6 1/2 Mile Penrissen Road in Kuching. In January 2011, the shelter was flooded, and most of the society's inventory of food was destroyed.

The society is seeking authority to enforce legislation against cruelty or neglect of animals, which it currently lacks.

== See also ==
- Animal welfare and rights in Malaysia
