= Senior Animals In Need Today Society =

Animal sanctuary for senior and special needs animals

Senior Animals in Need Today Society (SAINTS)
- Founded: 2004
- Type: non-profit charity
- Purpose: Animal welfare
- Location: Mission, British Columbia, Canada
- Region served: British Columbia
- Key people: Carol Hine
- Revenue: $267,000 in 2013
- Employees: 6 part-time in 2013
- Website: saintsrescue.ca

Senior Animals in Need Today (SAINTS) is a farm sanctuary for senior and special needs animals in Mission, British Columbia, Canada.

== History ==
Carol Hine began the sanctuary in 2004 to provide a more compassionate setting for senior animals who would otherwise spend their last days in animal shelters or pounds. After a short time in a smaller location, the sanctuary moved to a 3-acre (1.2 hectare) farm in Mission, British Columbia.

== The sanctuary ==
The farm location contains a home, barn, several outbuildings, a pond and several fields. By 2014, the sanctuary had been home to more than 600 animals since its opening. There are typically over 100 animals in care including dogs, cats, rabbits, sheep, horses, chickens, ducks, pigs, cows, goats and llama. Animals are available for adoption and there is a foster program which houses some animals in homes of volunteers.

== Rescues ==
- In 2009, SAINTS took in Rosebud, a dog from British Columbia with a number of challenges. One eye with glaucoma was removed; her rib cage had received trauma; and she was crippled. Volunteers enjoyed preparing special meals for her and sitting with her head in their lap. Rosebud died at the sanctuary after about six months of care.
- In 2011, two young pigs were seized by cruelty investigation officers from a makeshift pen in West Vancouver. They were transferred to SAINTS, where they stayed for a few weeks before being moved to a new home.
