= Animal People =

American nonprofit organization

- Region served: United States
- Official language: English
- Website: animalpeopleforum.org

Animal People, Inc. is a non-profit animal rights charity dedicated to generating knowledge and raising public awareness of animal sentience and suffering. Animal People was founded in 1992 with the mission of "exposing the existence of cruelty to animals and educating the public of the need to prevent and eliminate such cruelty; conducting or sponsoring animal care projects, both to directly alleviate animal suffering and to demonstrate humane methods of handling and responding to animal-related dilemmas; and studying animal-related issues via research, surveys, and investigative reports." From 1992 until 2013, the organization's main project was publishing the newspaper Animal People News, which covered current events related to animal issues worldwide. The newspaper was retired in 2014 following a split within the board of directors, and in 2015 Animal People launched a new project, the Animal People Forum, an online magazine and social networking site for people interested in animal rights, welfare, and conservation.

== History ==
Kim Bartlett was hired as editor of The Animals' Agenda news magazine in August 1986, where Patrice Greanville was already associate editor. Merritt Clifton had been freelancing for The Animals' Agenda, and was hired by Bartlett and Greanville as the feature writer in November 1986.

In mid-1988, several of the staff at The Animals' Agenda left to form E: The Environmental Magazine and Bartlett hired Clifton as news editor. In May 1992, shortly after the second annual Where the Money Goes report was published, Clifton was fired by The Animals' Agenda board. Bartlett resigned in protest and on the following day, Bartlett and Clifton incorporated Animal People. The board of directors was later expanded to four members.

In 2014, Merritt Clifton resigned to start his own online publication, Animals 24-7 as editor with his wife Beth as social media editor and photographer. As of 2016, Animal People's staff consists of president Kim Bartlett, executive director Wolf Gordon Clifton, publisher Patrice Greanville, archivist and photo editor Dylan Forest, and social media coordinator Anita Mayangpuspa.

== Programs ==
=== Domestic ===
The Animal People founders initiated neuter/return trials for feral cat population control in 1991, and in 1992, the program expanded to eight sites. In mid-1992 Bartlett and Clifton presented their findings at a conference sponsored by the Cummings School of Veterinary Medicine at Tufts University. This was among the several developments which established trap–neuter–return in the U.S. as a viable approach. The findings were later reported in the November 1992 issue of Animal People.

Animal People has subsequently engaged in many other hands-on research projects, particularly in the areas of improved housing for shelter animals, disease control, living in harmony with wildlife, and censusing street dogs and feral cats.

=== International ===
Animal People increased their emphasis on international coverage beginning in 1997, and in 1998, began relaying funding from U.S. donors to selected overseas projects. This program quadrupled in size after the December 2004 Indian Ocean tsunami, when Animal People funded and mobilized 12 animal disaster relief teams, working in India, Sri Lanka, and Thailand (and later in Indonesia). These were the first international animal welfare charities to respond after the tsunami.

From 2000 to 2010, Animal People directly sponsored several start-up African animal charities. Youth for Conservation, and the African Network for Animal Welfare, both of Kenya, have grown and developed considerable influence. Another, the Homeless Animals Protection Society of Ethiopia, did pioneering work in the Gobe and Addis Ababa regions but has since disbanded.

In 2014, Animal People provided financial support to local activists in Nepal for public awareness work against animal sacrifice at the Gadhimai festival, and sponsored the Blue Cross of India's deployment of patrol teams along the border of India and Nepal to enforce an Indian court order banning transport of animals for sacrifice at Gadhimai.

Animal People has co-sponsored the Asia for Animals conference series since 2001, the Middle East Network for Animal Welfare conference held in 2007, and the Africa Animal Welfare Action conference, first held in 2010.

== Publications ==
From 1992 until 2013, Animal People, Inc. published the newspaper Animal People News, as well as a stand-alone supplemental report, the annual Watchdog Report on Animal Protection Charities, which provided information on the leading animal-related charities. Both were retired in 2014. Since 2015, Animal People publishes articles and media submitted by users on the Animal People Forum. It also hosts the online exhibit Beyond Human: Animals, Aliens, & Artificial Intelligence, which explores current scientific evidence for animal intelligence and consciousness, ongoing efforts to discover extraterrestrial life and develop artificial intelligence, and the ethical implications of sentience in non-human beings.

== Awards and recognition ==
- Award for excellence in horse coverage from the International Generic Horse Association/Horse Aid (1994)
- Award for excellence in coverage of exotic wildlife issues from Wildlife Waystation (2002)
- Recognition for coverage of animal birth control issues from both Ahimsa of Texas and from the McKee Project in Costa Rica.

Kim Bartlett has received awards for leadership in disaster relief from the Asia for Animals conference, and for leadership in humane work in the Middle East from the Middle East Network for Animal Welfare.

In 2010, Merritt Clifton received the 15th annual ProMED-mail Anniversary Award, presented by the International Society for Infectious Diseases for contributions to the identification and control of emerging disease. Clifton was honored for contributions that led to identifying fruit bats as the host species for Nipah virus in April 1999; helping to identify the roles of cockfighting and falconing in the migration of H5N1; identifying aspects of halal slaughter as the probable source of outbreaks of the tick-borne Crimean-Congo hemorrhagic fever among Central Asian meat industry workers in 2009-2010; and especially, said ProMed-mail editor Larry Madoff, for contributions to epidemiological understanding of the cultural factors involved in the spread and control of canine rabies in India, China, Indonesia, and Vietnam.
