= Animal Welfare Investigations Project =

- Official logo of AWIP
- Abbreviation: AWIP
- Formation: November 23, 2021; 4 years ago
- Type: Animal welfare organisation
- Legal status: Registered company
- Purpose: Investigating and combating organised animal cruelty
- Headquarters: London, England
- Region served: Global
- Key people: Jacob Lloyd (Founder and CEO)
- Website: awip.org.uk

The Animal Welfare Investigations Project (AWIP) is an animal welfare organisation established in November 2021 by its founder and current Chief Executive Officer, Jacob Lloyd. It is headquartered in London, United Kingdom.

The organisation is dedicated to investigating organised animal cruelty across the globe, with a particular focus on dog fighting, wildlife crime, and puppy farming.

== History ==
AWIP was established on November 23, 2021 by its founder and current Chief Executive Officer, Jacob Lloyd. The organisation's headquarters is located in London, England.

AWIP is registered as a limited company in England and Wales and chooses not to operate as a charity to maintain flexibility in its operations and campaigning efforts.

The Animal Welfare Investigations Project is registered with the Fundraising Regulator.

== Activities and Achievements ==
AWIP focuses on several key areas of animal welfare:

=== Dog Fighting ===
The Animal Welfare Investigations Project (AWIP) actively investigates dog fighting in the United Kingdom, the United States of America, the Philippines, and other countries. These investigations aim to identify participants and gather evidence to support prosecutions. Despite legal prohibitions, dog fighting remains prevalent in certain regions, and AWIP works tirelessly to disrupt these operations and rescue the animals involved.

In July 2025, the Animal Welfare Investigations Project (AWIP) carried out an intelligence-led investigation into dog fighting in Tarlac City, Philippines. Following a search warrant executed by AWIP, the Philippine National Police (PNP) and the Presidential Anti-Organized Crime Commission (PAOCC), a man was arrested and dogs alleged to have been used in fighting were recovered along with dog fighting paraphernalia. It was reported to be the first such investigation in the Philippines in over thirteen years.

=== Wildlife Crime ===
The organisation investigates various forms of wildlife crime, including badger baiting, fox hunting, and bird trapping. It works alongside local law enforcement to investigate and disrupt wildlife crime. Notably, AWIP played a significant role in busting a wildlife trafficking network in the Philippines, resulting in the rescue of 149 turtles.

=== Dog Meat Trade ===
Working alongside the Philippine National Police, AWIP has investigated the dog meat trade in the Philippines.

=== Open Source Intelligence (OSINT) Training ===
In addition to its investigative work, AWIP provides specialised training in Open Source Intelligence (OSINT) to law enforcement agencies. This training equips investigators with advanced skills to gather and analyse online information related to organised animal crime. In May 2024, AWIP hosted a successful OSINT training webinar for U.S.-based investigators and prosecutors, enhancing their capabilities in combating dog fighting and other forms of animal cruelty.
