= IndyHumane =

US non-profit organization

- Formerly: Humane Society of Indianapolis
- Company type: Non-Profit
- Founded: 1905
- Headquarters: 7929 Michigan Road, Indianapolis, Indiana 46268
- Key people: Donna Casamento, 2022; David Horth, Interim CEO, 2018-2022; Steven Stolen, Former CEO; John Aleshire, Former CEO; David Horth, (Chair); Marsha Spring, Former Ex. Director, 1988
- Revenue: 7,905,263 United States dollar (2017)
- Total assets: 5,348,405 United States dollar (2022)
- Website: indyhumane.org

IndyHumane, formerly the Humane Society of Indianapolis, is a humane organization in Indianapolis, Indiana. Located in Marion County, Indiana, it is a private non-profit charitable organization with approximately 10,000 animals cared for each year and was founded in 1905. In 1919, the Humane Society of Indianapolis merged with the Citizen's Humane Society.

It is an animal rescue and adoption operation, whose physical plant is situated at 7929 Michigan Road in the city of Indianapolis. The mission of the Humane Society of Indianapolis is to "Provide shelter and comfort to animals in need on the path to loving lifetime homes."

== Services ==
Principal services offered are animal rescue, veterinary care of sick and injured animals who are in their care, adoption services, spay and neuter services for animals subject to intake, microchipping, and animal training. A full-time staff is employed. In house veterinary care is available for intake animals who are injured or infirm. Foster care is available for intake animals who need rehabilitation.To supplement the full-time staff of 37, IndyHumane has several hundred part-time volunteers.

IndyHumane has an on site adoption center and conducts classes in animal behavior.

== History and governance ==
IndyHumane is governed by a 22-member board of directors and has existed for 104 years.

In 1988 Marsha Spring was appointed executive director.

In March 2008, the Humane Society of Indianapolis partnered with Indianapolis Animal Care and Control to improve intake procedures and coordinate services.

In September 2008, John Aleshire began his tenure as executive director, replacing outgoing executive director Martha Boden, who left the position in June 2008.

In May 2017, John Aleshire retired from his CEO position after years of success. Steven Stolen was selected to step into the role of CEO after a nationwide search. Stolen was fired from the position a year later.

The organization had an interim CEO from 2018 to 2022, David Horth. In 2022, Donna Casamento was appointed CEO. Casamento's term included reports of low morale, staff resignations, and calls for the CEO to be replaced.

From late 2017 into 2018, the organization transitioned from "Humane Society of Indianapolis" to the shortened, colloquial name "IndyHumane." This rebrand included a new logo.

== Fundraising events ==
The Humane Society of Indianapolis hosts the Mutt Strut annually at the Indianapolis Motor Speedway. 2004 was the inaugural year.

The Humane Society was a beneficiary of the Indyprov Laff-a-thon in 2009.
