= Northcoast Marine Mammal Center =

The Northcoast Marine Mammal Center (NMMC) is a non-profit organization dedicated to the rescue and rehabilitation of stranded, sick or injured seals, sea lions, dolphins, porpoises, and whales along the northernmost coast of California. The Northcoast Marine Mammal Center is funded by donations and grants and has a large volunteer force which allows it to accomplish its mission. The Northcoast Marine Mammal Center is located in Crescent City, California and has operations that cover over 200 miles of rugged coastline.

NMMC was founded in 1984 by Dennis Wood, a California veterinarian.

== Board and staff ==
- Karen Helms - Executive Director
- Dennis Wood - DVM; Board Member, Veterinarian, Founder
- Christopher Callahan - Board Member
- Lee Barnhill - Board Member
- Amanda Hooper - Board Member
