= Animal Rescue Sofia =

Bulgarian non-governmental organization

Animal Rescue Sofia is a non-governmental organization (NGO) founded and registered in Sofia, Bulgaria. The organization is actively working to solve the issue with the homeless animals in Bulgaria, and works to provide shelter and loving homes for strays, as well as dogs that have been abandoned, abused, or are ill and in need of care. It lies in the largest Bulgarian online dog forum – www.dog.bg.

From 2010–2013, Animal Rescue Sofia managed the Bogrov Shelter, the largest dog shelter in the country located near Sofia, Bulgaria. Before its closure in 2013, the organization took care of more than 500 dogs there. ARS previously ran a free Neutering at the shelter, as well, and continues to run and participate in Animal adoption programs in Bulgaria as well as the Netherlands and Germany.

In December of 2013, ARSofia's three-year lease expired and was unable to be renewed. After investigating all other alternatives, Animal Rescue Sofia put together fundraising efforts in order to purchase a nearby farm that has the right location, buildings, and infrastructure for housing all the remaining animals.

In 2014, with the help of generous donations acquired through fundraising, ARSofia purchased "The Farm" and set up a large dog kennel within a large industrial building they purchased in the village of Dolni Bogrov. "The Farm" was the first and only non-governmental dog shelter in Sofia. Not limited to dogs, ARSofia also provides homes to horses that were abused by their former owners, as well as pigs, goats, and a mule.

ARSofia no longer has any affiliation with Bogrov Shelter.

The foundation is funded almost entirely by private and corporate donations.
