= Voluntarios en Defensa de los Animales =

- Founded: 1996
- Founder: Lenny Arancibia Zerain Arianna Kirkpatrick
- Purpose: Animal rights, animal welfare, animal shelters
- Location: Santa Cruz (Bolivia)
- Region served: Bolivia
- Method: Education, animal shelter
- Website: www.veda-bolivia.org

Voluntarios en Defensa de los Animales (VEDA), which means Volunteers in Defense of Animals, is a nonprofit organization that works for the welfare of domestic and wild animals in Bolivia. It was founded on April 6, 1996. Its main objective is to establish and protect the rights of animals through formal and informal education.

== Campaigns ==
In 1997, VEDA collaborated with the Asociación Ecológica del Oriente (Eastern Ecological Association) in a protest against the use of Folidol, a pesticide widely used that is believed to produce health problems and even death in humans and other species of animals.

In June 2005, VEDA, collaborated with the campaign of two other Animal Rights Organizations; Soprama- Santa Cruz and Animales SOS -La Paz, to rescue animals affected by the flood in San Julián, Santa Cruz.

On August 16, 2006, VEDA, organized the first "Walk for Animals Rights in Bolivia" .

Other activities include, protests against the abuse by the Municipal animal shelters, the killings of dogs in the towns of Warnes and Achacachi, where the group Ponchos Rojos (Red Ponchos) decapitated two dogs, the International Day for Animal’s Rights, and against vivisection at the State Veterinary University.

Some other activities included, a Children's drawing and painting contest, an interschool Research Contest, and a Charity Bingo, and the sale of second hand items as a way to collect funds to build a shelter for the animals.

== Objectives ==
Among its objectives, VEDA, offers education campaigns on responsible pet ownership, promotes the sterilization of dogs and cats, reports and ensures compliance of the Municipal Ordinance 030/2006, disseminates information on adoptions, promotes vegetarianism and is against the use of animals for scientific, entertainment, exhibition and trade purposes.
