= Alberta SPCA =

Canadian animal welfare charity

- Founded: 1959
- Type: Charitable organization
- Registration no.: 122554488RR0001
- Purpose: Animal welfare, education and enforcement
- Location: Edmonton, Alberta
- Region served: Alberta, Canada
- Employees: 30
- Website: albertaspca.org

The Alberta Society for the Prevention of Cruelty to Animals (Alberta SPCA) is a registered charity dedicated to the welfare of animals. It conducts enforcement of animal protection legislation and education programs throughout Alberta. Its animal protection officers are sworn in under the Peace Officer Act.

The Alberta SPCA was established in 1959. It works closely with other agencies in animal welfare, agriculture, education, violence prevention and other areas to provide protection for animals. All donations to the Alberta SPCA are used to support its programs in Alberta. It is contracted by Alberta Agriculture and Rural Development to enforce the Animal Protection Act.
