= Vets Beyond Borders =

Australia-based not-for-profit organization

Vets Beyond Borders (previously known as Vetcharity) is an Australian-based, not-for-profit, incorporated organization established by veterinary volunteers in 2003. Vets Beyond Borders co-ordinates and runs veterinary based animal welfare and public health programmes in developing communities of the Asia and Pacific region. VBB actively promotes volunteering in the veterinary community and supports local vets by running clinical training programmes to build the capacity of local staff.

"Working as a volunteer is a very rewarding facet of a veterinary career. It offers great opportunities to utilise one's skills in a way that truly benefits animals and communities in need. It also leads to the building of personal relationships and contributes to improved cooperation and understanding – needed in this world now more than ever." Programme Director Dr Ian Douglas

== Purpose ==
Vets Beyond Borders works with local governments and animal welfare organisations to establish effective veterinary-based programmes and undertakes the clinical training of local veterinary personnel to build their skills. VBB co-ordinates volunteer veterinarians and veterinary nurses to work on these programmes and supplies much needed medications and surgical equipment. The organisation facilitates the funding of buildings and important infrastructure such as kennels to hospitalise treated animals and contributes to the development of wider programmes to address animal welfare and community health issues.

== Achievements ==
- Surgically sterilised over 30,000 street-dogs preventing the birth of thousands more stray dogs every year.
- Vaccinated over 20,000 dogs and cats and other animals against rabies.
- Trained many hundreds of local veterinarians to improve their surgical skills.
- Provided care for many dogs who've never before seen a vet, and performed pain-relieving and life-saving procedures including fracture repair and cancer treatment.
