= Bahamas Humane Society =

Bahamas NGO for animal welfare

- Abbreviation: BHS
- Formation: 1924; 102 years ago
- Type: Animal welfare organisation
- Legal status: Active
- Headquarters: 85 Dunmore Ave, Nassau
- Region served: Bahamas
- President: Kim Aranha (2006–present); Betty Kenning (until 2006)
- Key people: Percy Grant (shelter manager)
- Website: www.bahamashumane.org

The Bahamas Humane Society (BHS) is a non-profit animal welfare organisation headquartered in Nassau, New Providence. In addition to operating as an animal shelter and vet, it seeks to promote humane treatment of animals and prevent animal cruelty through education. It is Nassau's oldest charity.

== History ==
Originally called the Dumb Friends League, the organisation was founded in 1924 and was based on Parliament Street. In its early years, the group primarily focused on the care and protection of the horses, donkeys, and mules that were used to pull carriages at the time. There were also efforts to feed stray dogs. In 1937, the Parliament Street premises were destroyed. The shelter moved to its current site in Chippingham in 1947, by which point it had rebranded to the Bahamas Humane Society. The BHS employed the country's first veterinarian. Through a spay neuter programme, the BHS was able to become a no-kill shelter.

== Operations ==
The BHS receives $15 thousand per year in government subsidies. Aside from that, the organisation relies on individual donations, memberships, and fundraisers for funding and supplies. They send speakers to classrooms and host student clubs in government schools. The site has two cat kennels, two dog kennels, and one kennel for other animals such as chickens and donkeys.

BHS leaders have advocated in favour of regulating and safeguarding the tourism industry found at the likes of Dolphin Encounters and Pig Beach for the animals involved.
