= Todd's Welfare Society =

- Founder: Kiran Maheen
- Purpose: Animal rescue and welfare
- Location: Lahore, Pakistan
- Board of directors: Kiran Maheen, Romana Bhatti, Maira Hussain, Umer Rajpoot, Abid Hussain

Todd's Welfare Society (TWS) is an animal rescue and animal welfare nonprofit organization established in 2016 that protected injured and abandoned animals in Lahore, Pakistan. TWS provides shelter, medical assistance, rehabilitation and homes for animals.

== History ==
Todd's Welfare Society was started on 6 March 2016 after an incident in which a dog, later named Joanne, was shot multiple times in the face by security guards of the Model Town Society in Lahore on 5 March 2016. Joanne's killing led to Kiran Maheen forming TWS the next day. TWS was named in memory of Kiran Maheen's pet dog, Todd, who was stolen outside her home in April 2010 and never found.

=== Work ===
Todd's Welfare Society has over 15 permanent members, more than 30 volunteers, and a volunteer program with different schools. Kiran Maheen has been invited to different events, such as TEDx Sialkot and TEDx Lahore, to talk about her work.

Apart from having a foster home in Cavalry, they have also rented new premises for another foster home in Burki, and have acquired land to start construction of their shelter.
