= Abhay Daanam =

Charitable bird and animal hospital

- Sansthanam Abhay Daanam
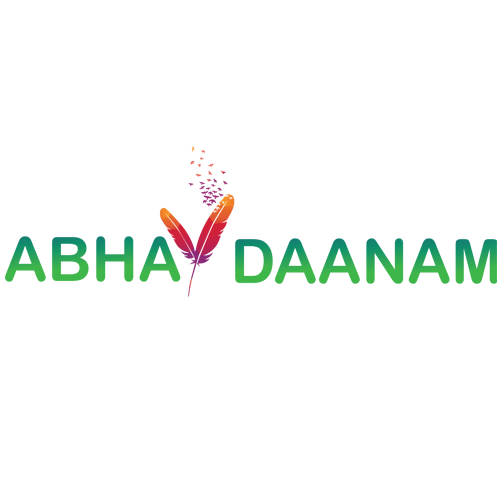
- Founded at: Ghaziabad
- Purpose: Save Birds and Animals
- Headquarters: Karol Bagh, Delhi, Bharat
- Location: Indirapuram, Ghaziabad, U.P, Bharat, Village Sunpura, Noida Extension, U.P, Bharat

Abhay Daanam is a charitable organization which operates bird and animal rescue shelters and a veterinary hospital. Established in 2016, they have a team of veterinary doctors and other staff, and provide free ambulance and medical services.

== Background ==
The founders, trustees, and volunteers of Abhay Daanam follow the beliefs of Jainism, such as compassion to all living beings. They opened their first bird rescue centre in Indirapuram, Ghaziabad U.P Bharat. Later they started rescuing large animals by opening their second shelter in Village Sunpura, Noida extension (U.P), Bharat.

Now they have established their shelters in three parts of Bharat and one outside Bharat

- Indirapuram, Ghaziabad (U.P)
- Village Sunpura, Greater Noida (U.P)
- Tirthankar Leni, Shahada (Maharashtra)
- Kotugoda, Colombo, (Sri Lanka)

Currently they have two ambulances.

== Demonstration ==
Abhay Daanam initiated a demonstration at Jantar Mantar, New Delhi by the name "Manja Kills", about the pain and suffering of birds caused by flying kites on the events like Makar Sankranti, and Independence Day.

== See also ==
- Animal welfare and rights in India
