= Susy Utzinger Animal Welfare Foundation =

Swiss non-profit organization

- Susy Utzinger Stiftung für Tierschutz "SUST"
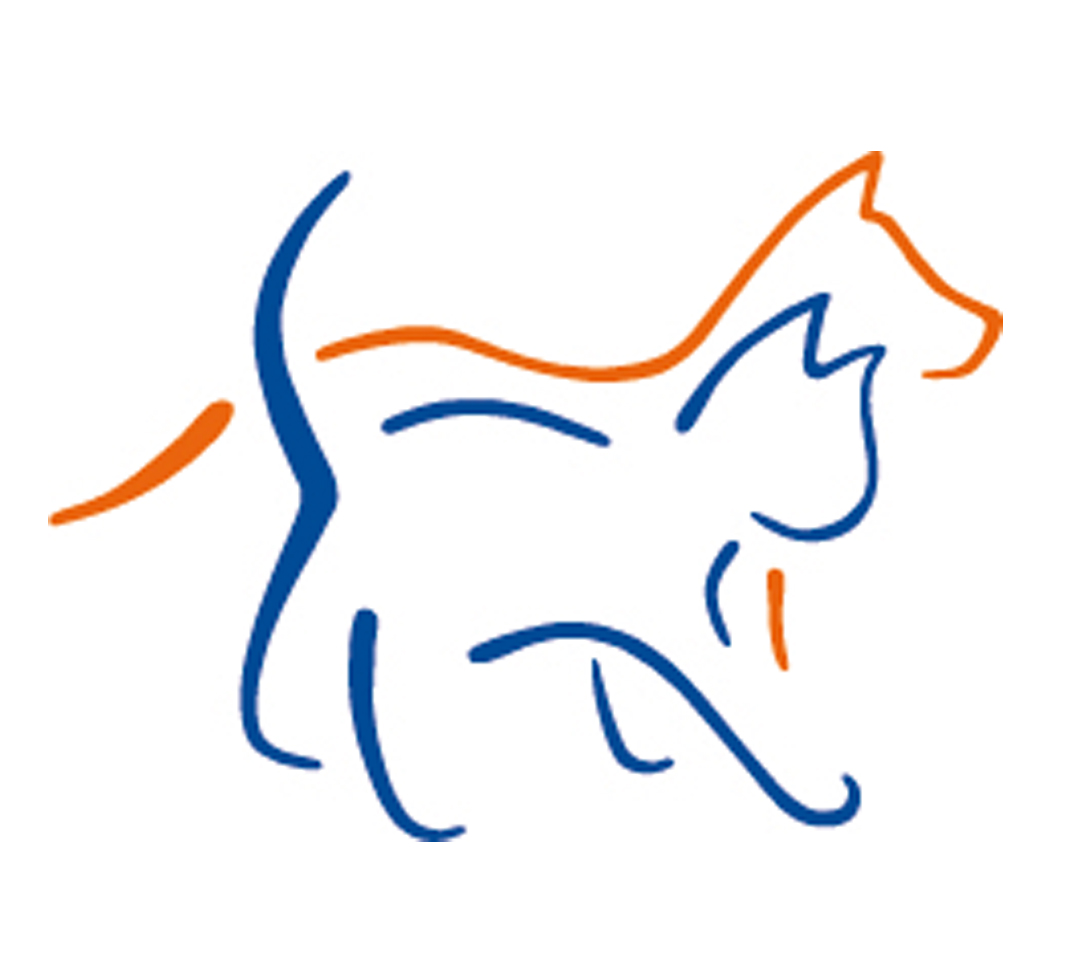
- Formation: September 7, 2000
- Legal status: Swiss Foundation
- Purpose: Improve the quality of animal shelters and animal welfare projects
- Location: Kollbrunn, Zürich, Switzerland
- Managing Director: Susy Utzinger
- Website: www.susyutzinger.ch

The Susy Utzinger Animal Welfare Foundation (Susy Utzinger Stiftung für Tierschutz "SUST") is a Swiss non-profit organisation that was founded by Susy Utzinger on September 7, 2000. The organisation is based in Kollbrunn in the Canton of Zürich. The mission of the foundation is to improve the quality of animal shelters and animal welfare projects, to prevent animal suffering and to promote animal welfare at the national and international level.

== Activities ==
The SUST's activities take place on both national and international level and consist of emergency aid and the four areas: shelter support, neutering campaigns, information to the public and training of specialists.

=== Emergency aid ===
Emergency aid ensures the survival of animals in Switzerland and other countries

- Help for animals of marginalised people in Switzerland: animal food for destitute pet owners, veterinary care, free spaying and neutering of dogs and cats.
- SUST sponsors the Swiss „Large Animal Rescue Service“ GTRD in the campaign "Farm animals as well deserve professional rescue".
- Laying hen campaigns in Switzerland: Find a new home for hens from large poultry farms, which would otherwise be sorted out and killed at the age of about one year.
- Rescue of amphibians in Switzerland: During the spawning season, volunteers bring toads and frogs safely across the streets.
- Professional care of injured and sick animals in the four SUST Orphan Animal Hospitals in Romania, Egypt and Peru. The foundation pays clinic equipment, drugs, surgeries, therapies, food and care in the animal orphanage hospitals. Veterinary services are therefore offered for free to the owners and their animals. The organisation often also finances the construction of the corresponding clinic.
- Support of rabies vaccination for animals such as in the Democratic Republic of Congo in 2018.
- Veterinary treatment, hoof and dental care for working horses and donkeys of destitute owners in Romania and Egypt by SUST veterinarians and farriers of different partner organisations.

=== Animal shelter support ===
The Susy Utzinger Animal Welfare Foundation supports animal shelters and animal protection projects. The SUST aims at species-appropriate animal husbandry, adequate veterinary treatment and professional care. During work assignments, teams of animal welfare workers evaluate organisational and structural problems and reorganise processes in order to optimise animal shelters. They carry out construction work, commission craftsmen and provide veterinary first aid. In addition, the foundation supplies building materials, animal equipment and fodder. Animal utensils can be donated to animal shelters and animal welfare projects via the Foundation's online animal welfare marketplace.

=== Neutering campaigns ===
Large-scale neutering campaigns are intended to reduce the overpopulation of street animals, who often live under difficult conditions. The Foundation cooperates with veterinarians in Switzerland and abroad and regularly carries out spay-and-neuter missions on site. The organisation sponsors campaigns focusing on feral cats and dogs and those living on farms, finances feeding stations and supplies material for castration campaigns, such as dog traps. In the SUST Orphan Animal Hospitals in Romania, Egypt and Peru, castrations are also carried out regularly. Posters, leaflets and brochures inform the public and sensitise them to the topic. In 2020, about 14370 cats and dogs were neutered in Switzerland and abroad.

=== Information to the public ===
Media reports, information campaigns, public lectures and free distribution of brochures and flyers inform the public about current issues and problems in animal welfare, husbandry and protection. School visits, webinars for children and the delivery of booklets in different languages sensitise children in Switzerland and abroad to animal welfare.

=== Education and training ===
The Susy Utzinger Animal Welfare Foundation Academy offers courses on the handling and care of animals and on the management of animal shelters and animal welfare projects. The seminars and lectures target veterinarians, animal keepers, dog trainers, volunteers and animal friends. A trainee programme prepares young Swiss veterinarians for animal welfare missions and neutering campaigns. By co-founding the „Swiss Association for Animal Welfare Work“ (Verband Arbeitswelt Tierschutz Schweiz), the organisation promotes a new profession "Animal Welfare Expert". In cooperation with partner projects in different countries, the foundation supports animal welfare seminars on site and veterinary trainings on population control, effective neutering and anesthesia techniques.

== Organisation ==
=== Founding board ===
The Board of the Susy Utzinger Animal Welfare Foundation is the strategic management body and controls and guides the organisation on the medium and long term. The Board and its meetings are chaired by the Foundation President, which since 28.01.2019 is Philippe Sami Kayasseh.

=== Staff ===
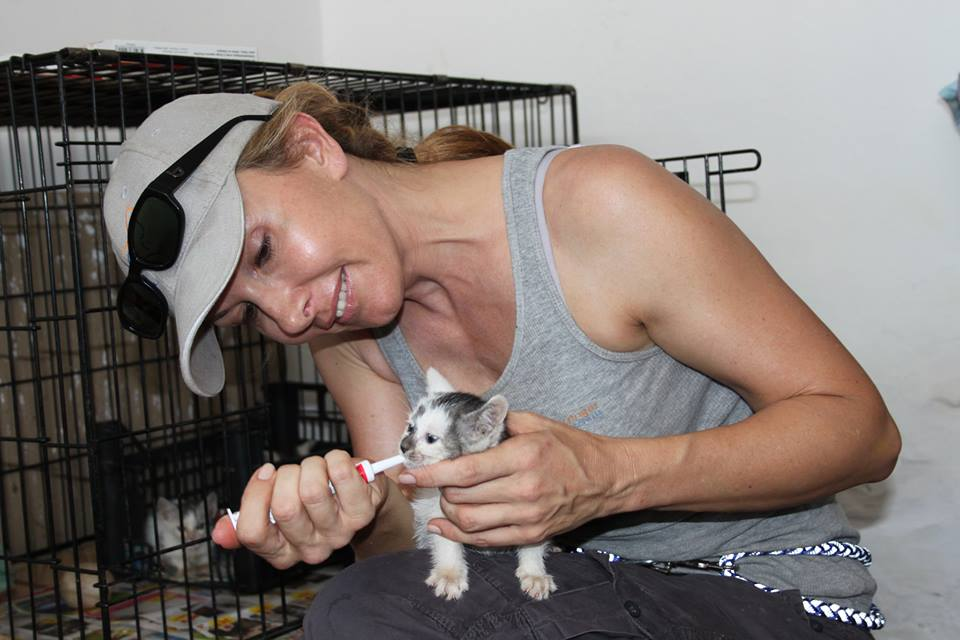
Managing director Susy Utzinger

The foundation operates out of Kollbrunn with managing director Susy Utzinger and seven part-time employees. The organisation cooperates with numerous partner projects worldwide.

== Financing and support ==
=== Financing ===
The Susy Utzinger Animal Welfare Foundation is financed by donations and bequests. In 2020, around 39146 individuals donated almost 3.2 million Swiss francs to the Susy Utzinger Foundation. In 2018, 36 percent of the funds went to projects in Switzerland, 64 percent were used for measures in other countries. The Foundation is under the supervision of the Federal Government. The annual accounts and the activity report are audited annually by the Federal Department of Home Affairs within the framework of the statutory supervisory obligation.

=== Animal welfare volunteers ===
In 2020, 244 volunteers and veterinarians contributed in their spare time to the work and activities of the Susy Utzinger Animal Welfare Foundation or supported the administrative development of the Foundation.
