= Cat Protection Society of Victoria =

Australian cat welfare organisation

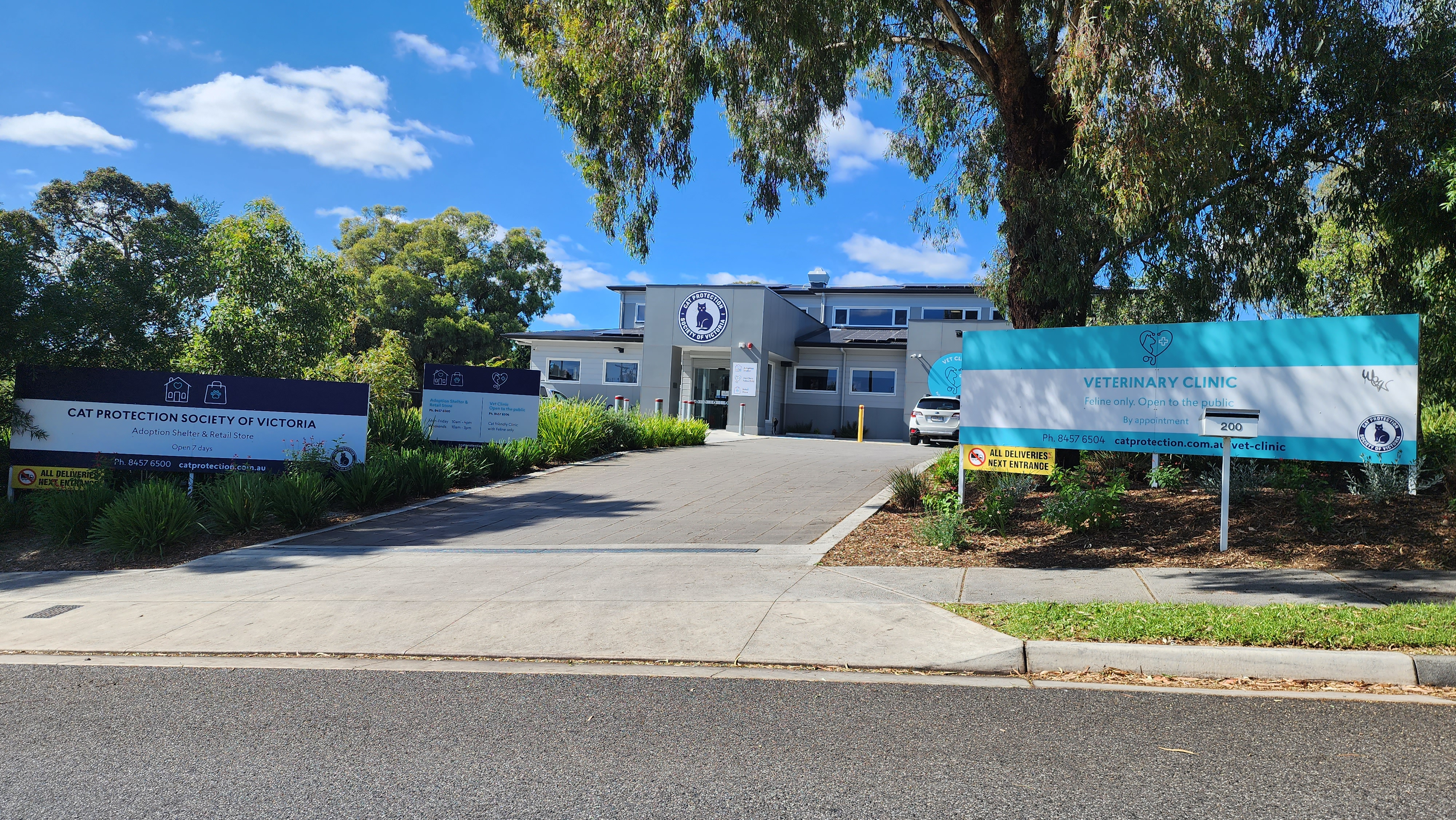
- Formation: 1947; 79 years ago
- Headquarters: (Australia) Greensborough, Victoria
- Location: Greensborough
- CEO: Ian Crook
- Website: www.catprotection.com.au

Cat Protection Society of Victoria (CPS) is an organisation in the state of Victoria, Australia, that describes itself as "Australia’s largest cat welfare organisation." It provides cat management and pound/shelter operation for a number of Melbourne councils. It is funded in part by these pound contracts but also receives private donations and is a tax deductible gift recipient.

CPS was instrumental in founding the "Cat Crisis Coalition" to lobby government at all levels for mandatory desexing in an effort to reduce the numbers of healthy cats and kittens whose lives are ended in shelters. It has also been instrumental in the Victorian government's "Who's for Cats" campaign which aims to discourage people from feeding cats they do not own.

== History ==
CPS was established in 1947 and has since been responsible for several campaigns intended to educate the public about responsible cat ownership and interactions.

The organization completed and opened their new shelter in Greensborough.While the initial plans and construction updates began targeting the shift around 2015, the facility officially opened its doors to the public in late 2020 (with full scale operations kicking off in early 2021).

== Performance ==
In 2009, CPS reported the following outcomes for admitted cats

- 8,881 Euthanised on entry – wild, unweaned, humane
- 2,467 Euthanised due to disease, no home available
- 1,011 Adoptions
- 132 Reclaimed

As of 2013, euthanasia rates were greatly reduced, and staff members have strived to rehabilitate as many cats as possible for rehoming.

== Position ==
=== Mandatory desexing ===
Higher euthanasia rates have been blamed on the cats' remarkable reproductive capability, asserting that an intact female can be responsible for 1,048,756 offspring in one year. CPS advocates for mandatory desexing laws aimed at reducing the number of cats born. The organization's executive director Dr Carole Webb was instrumental in forming the 'Cat Crisis Coalition' which lobbies for mandatory desexing in Victoria.

=== Who's For Cats Campaign ===
The organization was involved with a coalition of animal welfare organizations in creating and furthering the Victorian government's "Who's for Cats" campaign. The campaign aims to discourage people from feeding cats they don't own unless they take responsibility for them and get them desexed. Otherwise people are encouraged to call their council to have the cats removed and possibly euthanised. An extensive media campaign began in November 2007 and grew to become a national campaign throughout Australia.

An evaluation of the program in 2009 stated that all stakeholders considered the cooperative campaign approach was effective. Other issues hoped to be addressed included mandatory registration (achieved 1 November 2012 for Western Australia), containment of cats to the owner's property (now the law in some parts of Victoria under the Domestic Animals Act 1994 that allows local councils to create certain by-laws), impact of climate change on the cat breeding season, and promoting the benefits of responsible cat ownership.

== See also ==
- Animal welfare and rights in Australia
