= German Association for the Protection of Owls =

German owl conservation organization

Deutsche Arbeitsgemeinschaft zum Schutz der Eulen (AG Eulen)
- Type: Conservation charity
- Founded: 1976
- Key people: Chief Executive: Jochen Wiesner; President: Michael Jöbges
- Members: 640 (10/2013)
- Website: www.ageulen.de

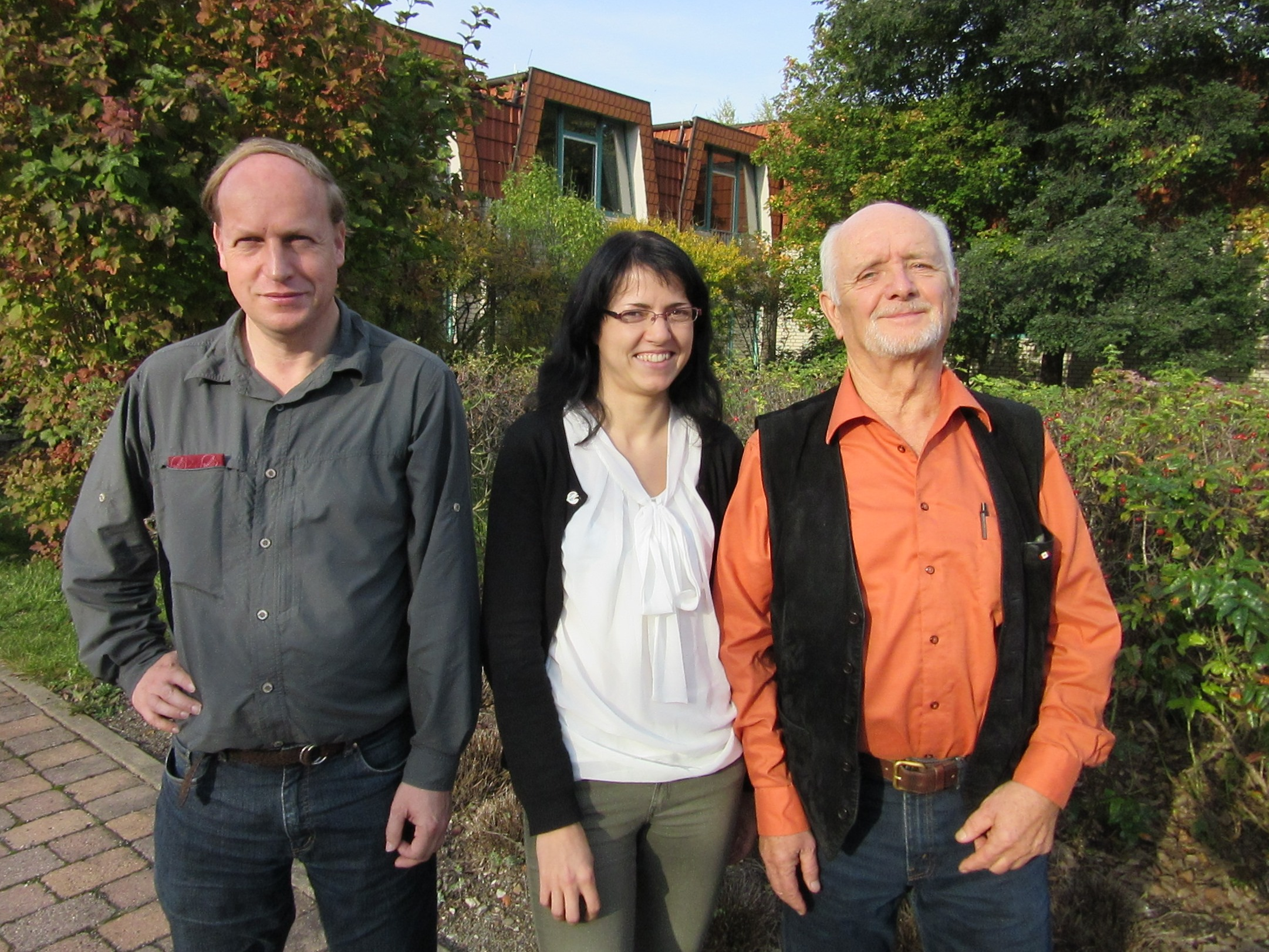
Chairman (right) and Deputy Chairman of the Owls Working Group committee in 2014

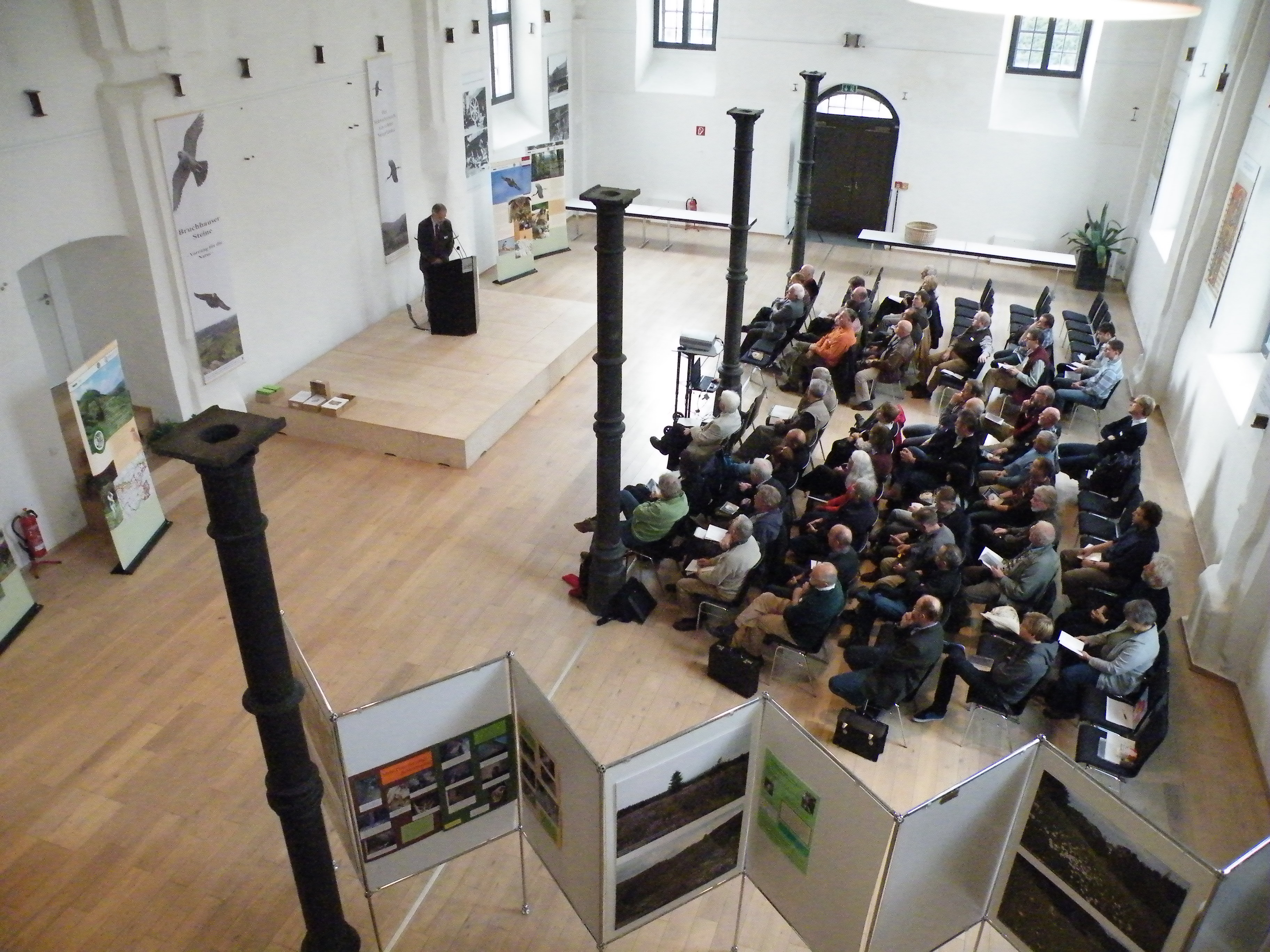
During a lecture in Bredelar Monastery at the 2011 annual meeting of the OWG

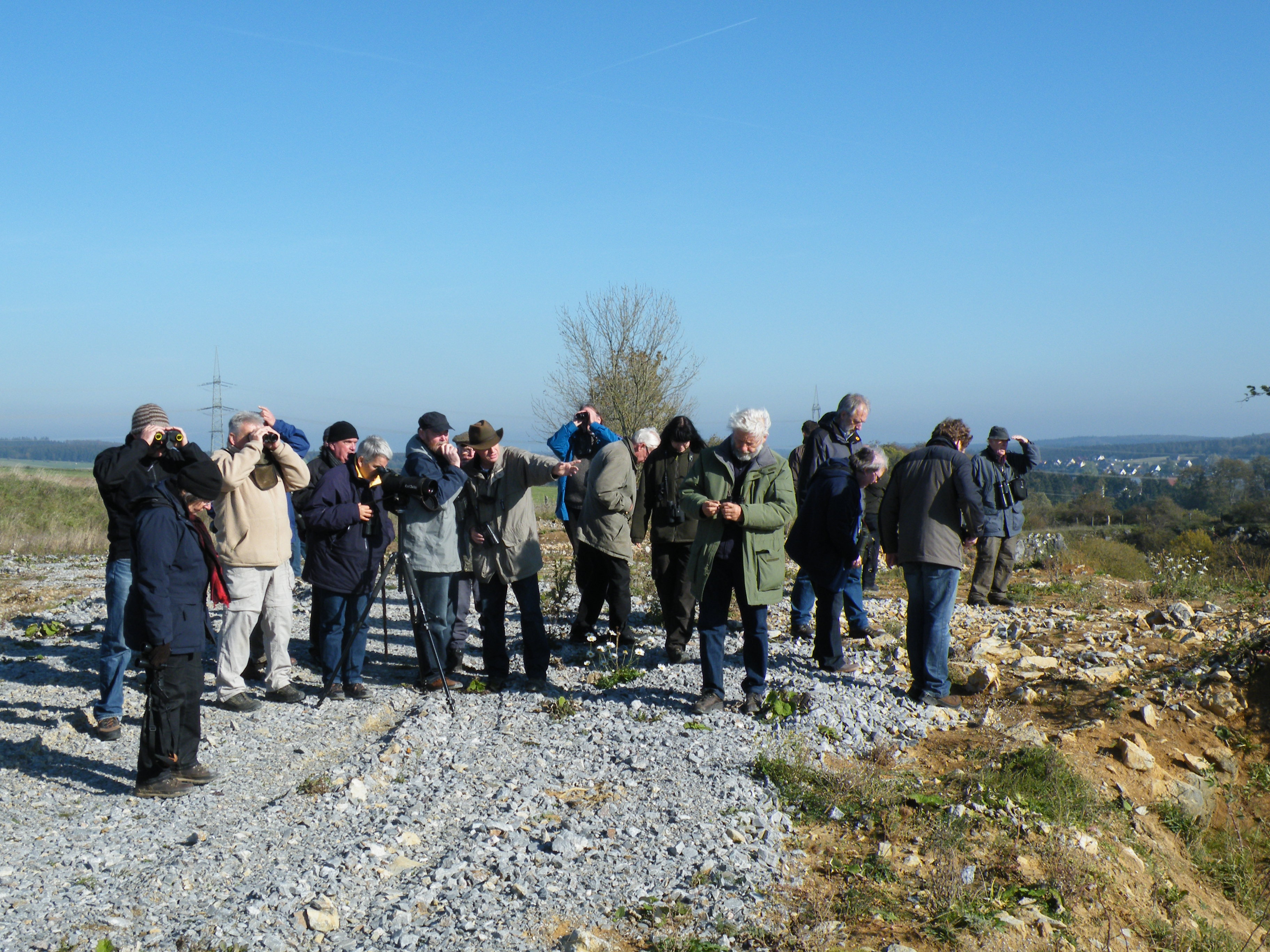
Excursion in a Rheinkalk quarry during the 2011 annual meeting of the OWG

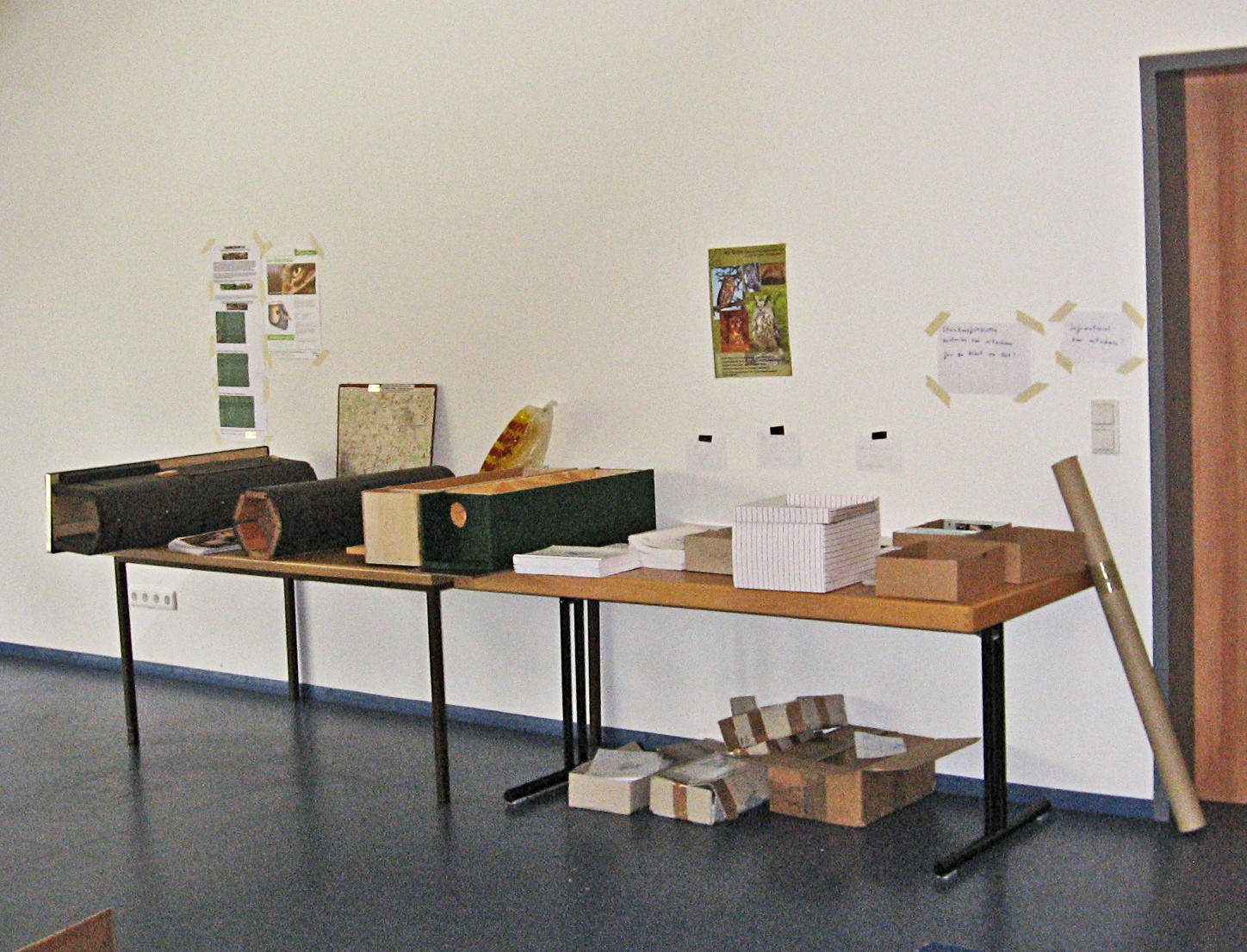
Stand of the OWG at the symposium "Endangerment and Protection of the Little Owl in Germany" in Metelen

The Deutsche Arbeitsgemeinschaft zum Schutz der Eulen (AG Eulen), translated German Association for the Protection of Owls (Owls Working Group), is a nationwide conservation organization that deals with the study and conservation of owls. The Owls Working Group (OWG) is a registered nonprofit association. It sees itself as an association of German-language owl experts. In addition to individuals, membership is open to groups, clubs, associations and institutions.

The nature and species protection work of the OWG is based on the gathering, evaluation and dissemination of knowledge and experience regarding the biology and protection of owls. Since 1994, the OWG has performed the functions of the Federal Working Group (BAG) for Owl Protection in the Federal Committee for Ornithology and Bird Conservation of the German Association for Nature Conservation (NABU). For each species of owl occurring in Germany there is a species specialist and for each federal state there is a state representative. Every year, the OWG organises a meeting at different locations, mostly in Germany, in cooperation with local associations or groups.

== History ==
In December 1974, about 30 people met in Soest to establish a little owl working group under the auspices of the Westphalian Ornithological Society and the Society of Rhineland Ornithologists. In March 1975, the Barn Owl Working Group of the two ornithological societies was founded in Alsdorf. In 1976, the two working groups were still holding separate meetings. At the end of 1976, both working groups were merged to form the Working Group for the Protection of Endangered Owls, abbreviated as Owls Working Group.

A first position paper, published in 1976, stated that the goal of the Owls Working Group was to carry out owl protection work on a scientific basis. The OWG joined the North Rhine-Westphalian branch of the German Association for the Protection of Birds (DBV), since renamed the German Association for Nature Conservation (NABU). In 1978 the OWG published standard methods for the recording of little owl populations. In 1979, the group's study area was expanded to cover the entire territory of the former Federal Republic of Germany. With the support of the then DBV president, Claus König, the OWG joined the National Association of the DBV. In 1981, the first national conference on the biology and protection of the little owl and the barn owl was held at the University of Giessen, attended by 150 participants. In the second nationwide owl conference held in 1985 with 190 participants, the lectures dealt with five species of owls.

As from 1985, the OWG has held annual meetings, with the sole exception of 1988. In 1986, Tengmalm's owl and pygmy owl were the subjects of a national conference that took place in Mitwitz castle. In the same year, the OWG published the results of detailed investigations conducted from 1974 to 1984 into the habitat requirements of the little owl in Germany. The first conference of owl experts from the whole of re-united Germany was held in Homburg an der Saar in 1990. From 1990 onwards, there was a close cooperation with the Association for the Reintroduction of the Eagle Owl (AzWU). As from 1994, the OWG took over the activities of the National Working Group (BAG) for Owl Protection in the Federal Committee (BFA) for Ornithology and Bird Conservation of the NABU. In 1995, the OWG was co-organizer of the conference held in Bad Blankenburg on Tengmalm's owl and pygmy owl in Germany. Since 2000, the OWG has maintained a website with the address www.ageulen.de.

In 2000, the OWG's first international conference took place in St. Andreasberg in the Harz district, with speakers and participants from all over Europe. This, the 2nd European Owl Symposium, attracted 220 owl experts. The conference languages were English and German. There were 44 lectures and 24 posters. Besides 30 contributions from Germany, there were some from Finland (6), Switzerland (6), Belarus (4), the Czech Republic/Slovakia (4), the United Kingdom (3), the Netherlands (3), Denmark (2), Italy (2) Poland (2), Belgium (1), Bulgaria (1), France (1), Norway (1) and Slovenia (1). In 2003, the OWG hosted the third European Symposium on The Ecology and Conservation of European Owls at the Inatura Centre in Dornbirn, Vorarlberg. This meeting attracted a particularly large number of Austrian and Swiss ornithologists.

In 2004, the OWG was co-organizer of the symposium Little Owl Protection in North Rhine-Westphalia, held at the Agricultural Centre, Haus Riswick in Kleve. In 2005, the efforts of the OWG significantly contributed to the eagle owl being declared "Bird of the Year". The OWG was co-organizer of the International Eagle Owl Symposium in Aschaffenburg. In 2008, the OWG was co-organizer of the World Owl Conference in Groningen. On one afternoon during this world conference, the OWG held its annual meeting. In October 2008, the Owls Working Group was restructured to form a registered society with the new name of the German Society for the Protection of Owls - Owls Working Group. In 2011, the OWG was again co-organizer of the Little Owl Conference Endangerment and Protection of the Little Owl in Germany at the Artenschutzzentrum Metelen

== Journal Eulen-Rundblick (Owl panorama) ==
The Owls Working Group brought out its first Info in DIN A5 format in 1975. After issue No. 37, this Info became the group's newsletter in DIN A5 format. This OWG newsletter was transformed in 1993 into the journal Eulen-Rundblick in DIN A4 format with its first issue bearing the number 39. Since 2007, one issue has been published every year.

The Eulen-Rundblick presents original papers on owls and owl research and protection, reviews of literature about owls, news topics concerning owls and information about the OWG. Since 2004, articles about the lectures held at the annual meetings can be published in the following year's Eulen-Rundblick. Lecture texts of individual conferences have also been published in special issues of such journals as Die Vogelwelt and Vogel und Umwelt.

== Members of the Owls Working Group ==
Since the 1990s, almost all German owl experts have been members of the OWG. The group also has members in all neighbouring countries. There are individual members in other European countries, especially in Eastern Europe and the United States. About 20% of the members are other working groups or groups active in other conservation organisations, in particular the NABU, or public authorities. The number of members rose strongly in three phases. The first major increase in membership took place at the end of the 1970s, when the group's study area was extended to the entire Federal Republic of Germany, then the mid-1980s, when it was decided to expand the OWG's work to cover all species of owl, and then at the beginning of the 1990s, after German reunification.

== Sources ==
- Klaus-Michael Exo, Ortwin Schwerdtfeger: 25 Jahre AG Eulen: Rückblick und Ausblick. Eulen-Rundblick 2002, 50:7-10.
- Jochen Wiesner: Die Deutsche Arbeitsgemeinschaft zum Schutz der Eulen e. V. Der Falke 2014/61, Sonderheft Eulen in Deutschland, S. 10–11.
