= Cat Society Hong Kong =

Hong Kong charity

- 香港群貓會
- Formation: 2007; 19 years ago
- Founder: Elaine Chan, Lian Ma
- Founded at: Hong Kong
- Type: Charity
- Purpose: Animal welfare
- Headquarters: 26 Chi Kiang St, To Kwa Wan, Hong Kong
- Location: Hong Kong
- Website: Official website

Cat Society Hong Kong
- Traditional Chinese: 香港群貓會
Transcriptions

The Hong Kong Cat Society (Chinese: 香港群貓會) is a registered charity in Hong Kong established in 2007 by Elaine Chan and Lian Ma.

The founding purpose of the organisation is to promote the protection of the rights of cats, foster the belief that humans and cats can coexist harmoniously in our shared communities, and educate the public on responsible cat ownership, aiming to control the population of stray cats through adoption and neutering programs, and prevent and/or assist with cases of cat abuse by advocating for animal welfare legislation.

They welcome volunteers to help care for the group of cats they house and provide medical care for in their To Kwa Wan shelter.

== No Kill Organisation ==
Cat Society Hong Kong is a no kill organisation, the cats rescued are provided with food, shelter and medical care for the rest of their lives.

== Animal welfare programs ==
- Adoption, homing & rescue

Rescuing stray cats from the streets, some of which are physically disabled, chronically ill, have been abused and have character defects, or are too old to be adopted. In 2011, the Cat Society Hong Kong conducted "Cats on Facebook" campaign to promote and encourage adoption services, within a month, all 50 cats involved in this campaign were adopted.

- Education

The organisation has hosted joint promotion campaigns aimed at raising awareness about stray cats and promoting responsible cat ownership among the general public.

- Volunteers

Home visit volunteers: to pay home visit to the new owner's house before the cat comes home;

Photo volunteers: take monthly photos of cats in the cattery or in foster homes;

Designers: design posters, Leaflets and Timeline Banners for the Cat Club;

Cat house volunteers: to help with cleaning the cattery, basic care (such as bathing), feeding the cats, and administering medication.

- Advocacy work

The Society suggested cat owners in PRH estates not to bring their cats to public areas, so to avoid problems such as losing cats and frightening of cats. The organisation also shared their views on pet trading in Legislative Council meeting.
