= RSPCA NSW =

Australian animal welfare charity

RSPCA NSW is a not-for-profit charity operating in New South Wales, Australia, that promotes animal welfare.

== History ==
=== British background ===
The idea behind the creation of an animal welfare charity in NSW has its roots in sentiments opposing the maltreatment of animals that were expressed by social reformers, clergy and politicians in Great Britain in the late eighteenth and early nineteenth century. Some early legislative efforts to ban practices such as bull-baiting in the English parliament were made in 1800 and 1809, the former effort led by William Johnstone Pulteney (1729–1805) and the latter by Lord Erskine (1750–1823) but the proposed Bills were defeated.

The first successful passage of anti-cruelty legislation in the British parliament occurred in 1822 under the direction of the Irish politician Richard Martin (1754–1834) who was nicknamed by King George IV as "Humanity Dick". Around the same time that Martin was drafting his anti-cruelty Bill, the Reverend Arthur Broome (1779–1837) had letters published in periodicals in which he canvassed for expressions of interest in forming a voluntary organisation to promote animal welfare and oppose cruelty. The creation of voluntary groups that agitated for legal and social reform through the patronage of aristocrats, clergy and parliamentarians was not unusual in Broome's day, particularly in the case of the abolitionist or anti-slavery movement.

After the passage of Richard Martin's anti-cruelty to cattle bill in 1822, Broome attempted to form a Society for the Prevention of Cruelty to Animals that would bring together the patronage of persons who were of social rank and committed to social reforms. Broome did organise and chair a meeting of sympathisers in November 1822 where it was agreed that a Society should be created and at which Broome was named its Secretary but the attempt was short-lived.

It was at Broome's invitation that a number of social reformers gathered on 16 June 1824 at Old Slaughter's Coffee House, London to create a Society for the Prevention of Cruelty to Animals. The meeting was chaired by Thomas Fowell Buxton MP (1786–1845) and the resolution to establish the Society was voted on. Among the others who were present as founding members were Sir James Mackintosh MP, Richard Martin, William Wilberforce, Basil Montagu, John Ashley Warre, Rev. George Bonner (1784–1840), Rev. George Avery Hatch (1757–1837), Sir James Graham, John Gilbert Meymott, William Mudford, and Lewis Gompertz. Broome was appointed as the Society's first honorary secretary. The Society received the Royal prefix, which was bestowed by Queen Victoria, in 1840 and thereafter became known as the Royal Society for the Prevention of Cruelty to Animals.

=== Early concerns about cruelty in the NSW Colony ===
In the colony of NSW some concerns about the maltreatment of animals were expressed in 1804 and 1805 in The Sydney Gazette and NSW Advertiser. In 1820 one unnamed journalist expressed the mistaken belief that Lord Erskine had been successful in having an anti-cruelty law passed:

Our noble Lord Chancellor (Erskine) proposed the law which was to save dumb animals from corrupt usage. Our late beloved Monarch pursued the glorious object, and thence it was that the blessed law took place in defence of the unhappy stupid creature.

The journalist then referred to various acts of brutality that had been reported concerning a pig and a dog, and evidently believed that the anti-cruelty law of England also applied in NSW.

In 1837 a correspondent wrote to the Sydney Herald to complain about the non-existence of a colonial equivalent to England's Society for the Prevention of Cruelty to Animals, and the paper echoed the sentiment that such an organisation was needed. When the gold-rush struck in the NSW western town of Bathurst, further concerns were expressed about the need for anti-cruelty legislation in NSW that would mirror Britain's laws. News from England about the prosecution of individuals sponsoring cock-fighting was reported in the Sydney press in 1863. Articles were sometimes published that referred back to past notable English characters, such as Sir Matthew Hale (1609–1676), who had made known their sentiments about opposing cruelty toward animals.

=== Creation of RSPCA in NSW ===
A groundswell of public opinion in NSW in favour of the creation of anti-cruelty legislation as well as an anti-cruelty organisation began to be expressed in editorials in 1864 and then in letters to newspapers in 1867. Similar sentiments about the necessity of passing anti-cruelty laws and creating organisations similar to England's RSPCA were published in the newspapers in the colonial states of Victoria, South Australia, Queensland, Tasmania and Western Australia from the 1860s until the early 1890s as each colonial state established an SPCA (South Australia 1875, Tasmania, 1878, Queensland 1883, Western Australia 1892). The first anti-cruelty society organisation that was created in the Australian colonies occurred in Melbourne, Victoria on 4 July 1871 known as the Victorian Society for the Prevention of Cruelty to Animals.

An anonymous letter to the editor seeking expressions of interest to create an anti-cruelty organisation was published in the Sydney Morning Herald on 3 July 1873. On Thursday 10 July 1873 a meeting was held in the offices of Mr R. Want of Pitt Street, Sydney where the resolution was voted for and passed:

That a society be formed for the prevention of cruelty to animals, to be called 'The New South Wales Society for the Prevention of Cruelty to Animals'.

At the meeting the positions of honorary secretary (Mr Charles Lett) and honorary treasurer (Mr A. Sandeman) were filled. On Wednesday, 16 July 1873 a meeting convened at 132 Pitt Street, Sydney in Mr Sandeman's office to establish the rules and to elect officers to positions in the newly created Society. On Monday 28 July 1873 it was announced at a committee meeting that the Society's first President would be the prominent Anglican Sir Alfred Stephen (1802–1894) who had served as the Third Chief Justice of NSW. He also served in the NSW Legislative Council and on four separate occasions he unsuccessfully attempted to have an animals protection bill passed.

The Society's first annual meeting was held at the Temperance Hall in Pitt Street, Sydney on 6 August 1874, and Sir Alfred Stephen presided. Also in attendance were several prominent public officials including Sir Saul Samuel (1820–1900) a Jewish community leader and parliamentarian, Mr E. Fosbery (Superintendent of Police), Rev. Dr. Charles Badham (1813–1884) a lecturer at the University of Sydney, Rev. William Ridley (1819–1878), and Mr George Oakes MLA (1813–1881). The annual report was read out, further resolutions were voted on and prizes were awarded to schoolboys for essays written about cruelty to animals.

=== Role of women ===
Frances Deborah Levvy (1831–1924), who was a Jewish convert to Christianity, joined the NSW Society. In 1884 she started for the education and benefit of children the Bands of Mercy which aimed to teach them to behave kindly toward animals. In 1886 she founded and served as the honorary secretary of the Women's Branch of the SPCA. She helped to drive a women's campaign by petitioning state politicians for the establishment of a stray dogs home in Sydney. She also collaborated with various philanthropists to establish in 1921 a convalescent home for horses in Sydney's eastern suburb Little Bay.

Women members in the local branches of the SPCA organised social community events to raise the profile of the charity and the problem of cruelty, which included annual dances, garden parties and fund-raising activities. The activities organised by the women's branch had, at times, to battle against apathy in the community and societal indifference concerning the problems of cruelty toward animals.

=== Later developments ===
RSPCA NSW was given its Royal Warrant in 1923. During the early to mid twentieth century some churches in NSW observed an annual "Animal Sunday" service to promote kindness to animals as well as raising awareness about the role of the RSPCA. After World War 1, RSPCA NSW published a periodical known as RSPCA Journal (until 1942), which was renamed Animals (from 1942–2013). Since 1991 it has also published Waggy Tails as well as another periodical for children since 2008 called Animania.

The RSPCA NSW inspectors were recognised as special constables by an amendment in 1943 to the Police Offences Act, 1901. In NSW the current relevant legislation that directly relates to the definition, investigation and prosecution of offenders who act cruelly toward animals is set out in the Prevention of Cruelty To Animals Act 1979 (often abbreviated as POCTA).

The RSPCA societies in the states and territories of Australia established the national body RSPCA Australia in 1981. During the twenty-first century the use and abuse of animals across Australia and within NSW has stimulated public debates on a range of issues including intensive agricultural farming, the live export trade, unlicensed puppy farms, animals used in circuses and rodeos, greyhound and horse racing.

RSPCA NSW has taken the position that the live export trade should be banned, that animals should not be kept in circuses, that puppy farms should be closed, and opposes the use of sow stalls. These debates, which tend to produce partisan standpoints based on different philosophical and ethical theories about animal welfare as one approach and animal rights as another approach, have raised questions among lawyers, activist groups, representatives of primary industries and politicians about the role of the RSPCA and the adequacy of existing animal protection laws in NSW and across Australia.

As of 2019 the CEO of RSPCA NSW is Steve Coleman. He was appointed in 2007.

== Funding ==
Although the RSPCA NSW receives a small percentage of its funding from the NSW Government the vast majority of it comes from the public as donations.

=== Charity events ===
The RSPCA has two major fundraising events each year. In May it holds Million Paws Walk and in August it holds Cupcake Day.

In addition to this, RSPCA NSW Volunteer Branches hold many fundraising events throughout the year.

=== Other fundraising ===
The RSPCA also receives funds through donations, bequests, corporate support and partnerships, raffles and RSPCA Pet Insurance.

== Operations ==
The RSPCA NSW runs 4 shelters, 2 behaviour and rehabilitation centres, 3 veterinary hospitals, 1 Education Centre, 25 volunteer branches and supports more than 34 Petbarn adoption centres. These locations assist in the rescue, treatment and rehoming of animals in need across the state.

There are approximately 40 Inspectors to investigate animal cruelty, mistreatment and abuse claims. This includes which consist a Chief Inspector, a Deputy Chief Inspector, team leaders, north regional inspectors, south regional inspectors and Sydney metropolitan inspectors.

== Objectives ==
The RSPCA lists its objectives as:

- To prevent cruelty to animals by ensuring the enforcement of existing laws at federal and state level.
- To procure the passage of such amending or new legislation as is necessary for the protection of animals.
- To develop and promote policies for the humane treatment of animals that reflect contemporary values and scientific knowledge.
- To educate the community with regard to the humane treatment of animals.
- To engage with relevant stakeholders to improve animal welfare.
- To sustain an intelligent public opinion regarding animal welfare.
- To operate facilities for the care and protection of animals.

== Programs ==
RSPCA NSW runs a variety of education and outreach programs. As of 2019, these include:

=== Community Aged Care program ===
The RSPCA NSW Aged Care program aims to keep elderly owners and their pets together for as long as possible. The program assists pet owners over the age of 65, Indigenous pet owners over the age of 50 and palliative care patients of any age. Services include temporary foster accommodation or pet boarding in the event of an emergency, assistance with veterinary treatment, home visits and grooming, among others. This program was previously named Pets Of Older Persons.

=== Community Domestic Violence program ===
The RSPCA NSW Domestic Violence program provides emergency support to pet owners leaving situations of domestic violence. The program cares for owners' pets until they are safe enough to collect them. In some instances, RSPCA NSW will also provide financial assistance for veterinary treatment, impound fees and transport fees. The program was previously named Safe Beds for Pets.

=== Community Homelessness program ===
The RSPCA NSW Community Homelessness program assists pet owners who are currently homeless by providing boarding and/or financial assistance for veterinary treatment or impound fees. This includes owners who are couch surfing, sleeping rough or are in temporary accommodation. The program was previously named Living Ruff.

=== Home Ever After ===
Home Ever After is an RSPCA NSW rehoming program for elderly owners. The program sets up a plan to care for and rehome an owner’s pet after they’ve passed away or have become permanently incapacitated.

=== Indigenous Community Companion Animal Health Program (ICCAHP) ===
The RSPCA NSW Indigenous Community Companion Animal Health Program aims to improve the health and wellbeing of Aboriginal children and families in remote communities by improving the health and welfare of their pets. The program provides veterinary services and education to members of regional New South Wales communities including Bourke, Brewarrina, Collarenebri, Enngonia, Goodooga, Taree, Walgett, Weilmoringle and Wilcannia.

=== Outreach Animal Assistance programs ===
RSPCA NSW runs a number of community-based, means-tested outreach programs to vaccinate and desex companion animals. These include, but are not limited to, the Community Animal Welfare Scheme (CAWS) and the Community Vaccination Days.

== Criticisms ==
In 2013, a 100-person vigil was held outside the RSPCA's Million Paws Walk in memory of Max the Pointer, who was put down for behavioural issues that the Justice4Max protest group claimed were unfounded. Of the protest and ensuing criticism, RSPCA NSW CEO Steve Coleman said, "It would be unethical and socially irresponsible to re-home many of the animals that come through our doors. Even still, the RSPCA continues to improve, invest and innovate in order to increase re-homing and reduce euthanasia statistics."

Animal euthanasia rates within the organisation have steadily decreased since 2012. All statistics regarding the number of animals treated, rehomed, rescued or euthanised by RSPCA NSW are available in their publicly-accessible annual report.

== Temperament test ==
The RSPCA's national Temperament test is not publicly available. Its application and situational use has been criticised as many of the behaviours in it are exhibited by frightened dogs as well, which makes its use unacceptable according to some people. One of the people who claim to have helped devise the test also states it is used incorrectly – that it was intended to be used as a guide to assess the rehabilitation requirements of the dog – not justify euthanising it.

Also there has been speculation that the temperament testing may not be being applied correctly or properly, casting further doubt on its usefulness, as a quarter of people using it to assess dogs had not been trained to and more than half believed they were not given enough time to assess the dogs.

== See also ==
- RSPCA Australia
- Animal welfare and rights in Australia

== Bibliography ==
- J. M. Bennett, Sir Alfred Stephen: Third Chief Justice of New South Wales (Series: The Lives of the Australian Chief Justices. Sydney: the Federation Press, 2009). ISBN 978 186287 754 2
- Rob Boddice, A History of Attitudes and Behaviours Toward Animals in Eighteenth- and Nineteenth-Century Britain (Lewiston, New York; Queenston, Ontario; Lampeter, Wales: Edwin Mellen Press, 2008). ISBN 978-0-7734-4903-9
- Alex Bruce, Animal Law in Australia: An Integrated Approach (Sydney: LexisNexis Butterworths, 2012). ISBN 9780409327267
- Deborah Cao, Animal Law in Australia and New Zealand (Sydney: Thomson Reuters, 2010). ISBN 978 0 455 22618 7
- Li Chien-hui, "A Union of Christianity, Humanity, and Philanthropy: The Christian Tradition and the Prevention of Cruelty to Animals in Nineteenth-Century England", Society and Animals 8/3 (2000): 265–285.
- Edward G. Fairholme and Wellesley Pain, A Century of Work For Animals: The History of the RSPCA, 1824–1934 (London: John Murray, 1934).
- Hilda Kean, Animal Rights: Political and Social Change in Britain since 1800 (London: Reaktion Books, 1998). ISBN 1 86189 014 1
- Stephen Keim and Tracy-Lynne Geysen, "The Rights of Animals and The Welfarist Approach: May the Twain Meet?" Australian Animal Protection Law Journal 5 (2011): pp 26–43.
- Jennifer MacCulloch, "Creatures of culture: the animal protection and preservation movements in Sydney, 1880–1930" PhD Thesis, University of Sydney 1993.
- Arthur W. Moss, Valiant Crusade: The History of the RSPCA (London: Cassell, 1961).
- Barbara Pertzel, For All Creatures: A History of RSPCA Victoria (Burwood East, Victoria: RSPCA Victoria, 2006). ISBN 0 646 46078 1
- Stefan Petrow, "Civilizing Mission: Animal Protection in Hobart 1878–1914", Britain and the World 5 (2012): pp 69–95. available to subscribers
- Peter Phillips, Humanity Dick The Eccentric Member for Galway: The Story of Richard Martin, Animal Rights Pioneer, 1754–1834 (Tunbridge Wells, Kent: Parapress, 2003). ISBN 1-898594-76-7
- Harriet Ritvo, The Animal Estate: The English and Other Creatures in the Victorian Age (Cambridge, Massachusetts: Harvard University Press, 1987). ISBN 0-674-03707-3
- Peter Sankoff and Steven White Eds. Animal Law in Australasia (Sydney: The Federation Press, 2009). ISBN 978 186287 719 1
- Kathryn Shevelow, For The Love of Animals: The Rise of the Animal Protection Movement (New York: Henry Holt, 2008). ISBN 978-0-8050-9024-6
- Ian Weldon, "Why doesn't animal protection legislation protect animals? (and how it's getting worse)", Australian Animal Protection Law Journal 1 (2008): pp 9–14.
