= RSPCA Tasmania =

Australian animal welfare charity

- Formation: 19 July 1878
- Legal status: Charity
- Headquarters: Mowbray, Tasmania, Australia
- Services: Animal welfare, community education, animal advocacy
- CEO: Andrea Dawkins
- Parent organisation: RSPCA Australia
- Website: rspcatas.org.au

RSPCA Tasmania (Royal Society for the Prevention of Cruelty to Animals Tasmania) is an animal welfare, education and advocacy charitable organisation based in Tasmania, Australia. They run and maintain a shelter facility for the boarding of surrendered and seized animals, as well as operating retail shop fronts for the adoption of pets. They are responsible for the enforcement of state and federal animal welfare laws for domestic animals, and laws relating to non-commercial animal related activities in Tasmania.

== History ==
The emergence of an anti-cruelty organisation in Tasmania is partly due to the intellectual currents that developed in England over the maltreatment of animals in the eighteenth and nineteenth century. Sentiments opposing the maltreatment of animals were expressed by social reformers, clergy and politicians in England with early legislative efforts to ban practices such as bull-baiting in the English parliament were made in 1800 and 1809, the former effort led by William Johnstone Pulteney (1729–1805) and the latter by Lord Erskine (1750–1823) but the proposed Bills were defeated.

=== Creation of England's RSPCA ===
The first successful passage of anti-cruelty legislation in the British parliament occurred in 1822 under the direction of the Irish politician Richard Martin (1754–1834) who was nicknamed by King George IV as "Humanity Dick". Around the same time that Martin was drafting his anti-cruelty bill, the Reverend Arthur Broome (1779–1837) had letters published in periodicals in which he canvassed for expressions of interest in forming a voluntary organisation to promote animal welfare and oppose cruelty.

After the passage of Richard Martin's anti-cruelty to cattle bill in 1822, Broome attempted to form a Society for the Prevention of Cruelty to Animals that would bring together the patronage of persons who were of social rank and committed to social reforms. Broome did organise and chair a meeting of sympathisers in November 1822 where it was agreed that a Society should be created and at which Broome was named its Secretary, but the attempt was short-lived.

Broome made a renewed attempt and distributed invitations so that a number of social reformers gathered on 16 June 1824 at Old Slaughter's Coffee House, London, to create a Society for the Prevention of Cruelty to Animals. The meeting was chaired by Thomas Fowell Buxton MP (1786–1845) and the resolution to establish the Society was voted on. Among others who were present as founding members were Sir James Mackintosh MP, Richard Martin, William Wilberforce, Basil Montagu, John Ashley Warre, Rev. George Bonner (1784–1840), Rev. George Avery Hatch (1757–1837), Sir James Graham, John Gilbert Meymott, William Mudford, and Lewis Gompertz. Broome was appointed as the Society's first honorary secretary. Queen Victoria in 1840 bestowed the Royal Prefix so that it became known as the Royal Society for the Prevention of Cruelty to Animals.

=== Early concerns in Tasmania ===
The earliest piece of colonial legislation that carried penalties for some forms of cruelty toward animals was passed in Tasmania (then called Van Diemen's Land) in 1837. This piece of legislation, however, lacked the proper infrastructure needed for its enforcement and it was replaced by the Prevention of Cruelty to Animals Act 1877 and amended in 1879. In the 1860s, Tasmanian newspapers occasionally published articles concerning animal cruelty issues that were from British newspapers. Sentiments about the necessity of passing substantial anti-cruelty laws and creating an organisation similar to England's RSPCA were published in the 1870s.

The Tasmanian SPCA was created at a public meeting on Friday 19 July 1878 that was chaired by the Governor Frederick Weld (1823–1891) and other prominent figures including Sir James Milne Wilson (1812–1880) and the Anglican Dean of Hobart Rev. Henry B. Bromby (1840–1911). The resolution was passed at this meeting "that a society for the prevention of cruelty to animals be established in Tasmania." Rev. Bromby addressed the crowd stating: "They should take high ground in estimating the work of the society, that they should not only deem it as an auxiliary to the existing law for the prevention of cruelty to animals, but that they should deem this prevention to form parts of their Christian duty. For the humane treatment of the brute creation was enjoined by the Bible, and the same had been emphatically laid upon them by our Saviour's words, so that it might be considered to form one of the foundations of Christianity."

=== Christian influence on SPCA ===
Stefan Petrow's account of the early years of Tasmania's SPCA indicates that there was a close relationship established with England's RSPCA. Petrow notes that "religious motivations were regularly affirmed at annual general meetings." The Society's early efforts included witnesses reporting to the police incidents of cruelty and the publication of literature encouraging children to act kindly toward animals.

In the early twentieth century, various churches in Tasmania sponsored an annual Animal Sunday service which had the twin aims of promoting kindness towards animals as well as supporting the SPCA. Johannes Heyer (1872–1945), who served as the minister at St. John's Presbyterian Church, Macquarie Street, Hobart, as well as the moderator of the Presbyterian Church in Tasmania, also served as the secretary of the Hobart branch of the SPCA.

=== Later developments ===
During the twentieth century, public concerns in Tasmania were expressed over the maltreatment of horses by youthful cart-drivers. The society participated in government inquiries concerning the export of animals. The SPCA also asked for further legal amendments concerning the keeping of birds in captivity. A branch of the Society was established in Launceston, and it opened up junior members branches for the Society in various Launceston-based schools. In 1950, the Launceston branch sought funding for an animal hospital.

The Royal Warrant was granted to the Tasmanian SPCA in 1956. In 1980, the Tasmanian RSPCA helped in the formation of the national body known as RSPCA Australia.

During the twenty-first century, the use and abuse of animals across Australia and within Tasmania has stimulated public debates on a range of issues, including intensive agricultural farming, the live export trade, unlicensed puppy farms, animals used in circuses and rodeos, and greyhound and horse racing. RSPCA Tasmania has invited the public via its website to participate in campaigns that oppose the use of whips in horse racing and calling for government intervention on unlicensed puppy farm breeding.

== Law enforcement ==
The RSPCA Tasmania inspectorate team has 6 dedicated staff to enforce animal welfare laws in Tasmania. They have a range of powers, including the ability to fine individuals on the spot for violations. The legal powers that authorise Tasmania's RSPCA inspectors to investigate reports of animal cruelty are specified in the Animal Welfare Act 1993.

== Criticism ==
RSPCA Tasmania has had some of the heaviest criticism of all RSPCA branches. From 2008 to 2010, criticism of the RSPCA's Tasmanian branch reached the national headlines following a disagreement with Australia's 4th richest woman Jan Cameron, who criticised RSPCA Tasmania on the raising of staff wages, its increased euthanasia rates, its lowered number of accepted animals and for mismanagement of the board, resulting in her withdrawal of millions of dollars of pledged funding. Criticism by a string of former board members also reached the headlines after Susanna Cass, former President of the Tasmanian branch, resigned from the board and then later had her membership revoked because a statement made by Cass in the media "negatively impacted on the society's ability to meet its objectives", according to the RSPCA's official release. She later accused the board of spending money on unrequired bureaucracy instead of animal welfare.

Director John Bates also resigned from the state board in 2009, and later had his membership revoked and was disallowed from volunteering at the Hobart RSPCA shelter after he raised concerns about the management of donations by the branch. Further troubles with volunteers, including other board members, took place in 2008 and 2009, when RSPCA Tasmania controversially sacked the manager of the Burnie Shelter, Joan McQueen, and was forced to pay out an undisclosed amount to McQueen following the Burnie City Council seeking a meeting to discuss the matter and a mass walkout of Burnie Shelter RSPCA volunteers. The RSPCA later revoked the membership of the estranged husband of Joan McQueen, Mick McQueen – former chairman of the board – for an altercation on the day of his wife's sacking with the chairman at the time Dr Rick Butler. Mr McQueen later criticised the RSPCA board as having a "boys club mentality".

On 13 November 2012, the Green's Animal Welfare Spokesperson (Cassy O'Connor) called on the Deputy Premier to step in and dismiss the current board of three. The Minister indicated that unfortunately he did not have the power to take such action under any legislation in Tasmania. On the same day with unanimous support, it was moved by the State Parliament that the affairs of RSPCA Tasmania and the usage of tax payer money be investigated by the Public Accounts Committee.

In November 2012, the board of RSPCA Tasmania sacked its CEO, Ben Sturges (son of the MP Graeme Sturges), after an independent investigation by James O'Neill and Associates alleged that he had bullied and threatened staff and their jobs, made derogatory comments about the RSPCA Tasmania board and withheld information from them, deleted portions of emails, and destroyed a work laptop. The investigation also concluded he had artificially created the position of Chief Veterinarian for the organisation's only veterinarian with whom he was in a relationship, therefore entitling her to a pay rise. Ben Sturges initially took the matter to Fair Work Australia to dispute his sacking and requesting reinstatement. He withdraw his complaint on 7 February, the day he was due to give evidence to Fair Work Australia.

In relation to the incident, calls were made by former President of RSPCA Tasmania Suzanne Cass to have the board of RSPCA Tasmania sacked.

== See also ==
- Animal welfare and rights in Australia

== Bibliography ==
- Alex Bruce, Animal Law in Australia: An Integrated Approach (Sydney: LexisNexis Butterworths, 2012). ISBN 9780409327267
- Deborah Cao, Animal Law in Australia and New Zealand (Sydney: Thomson Reuters, 2010). ISBN 978 0 455 22618 7
- Li Chien-hui, "A Union of Christianity, Humanity, and Philanthropy: The Christian Tradition and the Prevention of Cruelty to Animals in Nineteenth-Century England," Society and Animals 8/3 (2000): 265-285
- Edward G. Fairholme and Wellesley Pain, A Century of Work for Animals: The History of the RSPCA 1824-1934 [England] (London: John Murray, 1934).
- Hilda Kean, Animal Rights: Political and Social Change in Britain since 1800 (London: Reaktion Books, 2000). ISBN 9781861890610
- Arthur W. Moss, Valiant Crusade: The History of the RSPCA (London: Cassell, 1961).
- Stefan Petrow, "Civilizing Mission: Animal Protection in Hobart 1878-1914," Britain and the World 5 (2012): 69-95.
- Peter Phillips, Humanity Dick The Eccentric Member for Galway: The Story of Richard Martin, Animal Rights Pioneer, 1754-1834 (Tunbridge Wells, Kent: Parapress, 2003). ISBN 1-898594-76-7
- Peter Sankoff & Steven White eds. Animal Law in Australasia (Sydney: Federation Press, 2009). ISBN 978 186287 719 1
- Kathryn Shevelow, For The Love of Animals: The Rise of the Animal Protection Movement (New York: Henry Holt, 2008). ISBN 978-0-8050-9024-6
