= RSPCA Australia =

Australian animal welfare organisation

- Formation: 1981
- Type: Peak body
- Legal status: Charity
- Headquarters: Deakin, Australian Capital Territory, Australia
- Location: Canberra, ACT
- Members: 8
- Chair: Jan Edwards
- CEO: Richard Mussell
- Key people: CEO - Richard Mussell
- Budget: A$100 million
- Staff: 35
- Website: www.rspca.org.au

RSPCA Australia (Royal Society for the Prevention of Cruelty to Animals) is an Australian peak organisation established in 1981 to promote animal welfare. Each state and territory of Australia has an RSPCA organisation that predates and is affiliated with RSPCA Australia.

It describes itself as a "federated organisation made up of the eight independent state and territory RSPCA Societies."

RSPCA Australia defines its purpose as being the leading authority in animal care and protection, and to prevent cruelty to animals by actively promoting their care and protection. It also monitors the use of animals in media.

== Objective ==
The objective of RSPCA Australia is to provide a national presence for the RSPCA movement and to promote unity and a commonality of purpose between the state and territory based bodies. The national Council of RSPCA Australia meet three times a year. Each affiliate RSPCA has two members on the national Council. The Council meets to formulate new policies and offer advice to government and industry bodies on animal welfare issues.

== History ==
In each state and territory of Australia there are separate RSPCA organisations that are differentiated by their state/territorial names such as RSPCA NSW, RSPCA Victoria and so forth. During 1980, two meetings were held among delegates from each state/territorial RSPCA body to enable the formation of a national RSPCA body. The first meeting of the RSPCA Australia was held in February 1981.

=== British Background ===
The Australian-based RSPCA societies owe their origins to the RSPCA in England. Although no formal link exists between the RSPCA in both countries it is the UK experience that led to the formation of societies in the Australian colonies. The intellectual climate of the late eighteenth and early nineteenth century in Britain reflected opposing views that were exchanged in print concerning the use of animals. The harsh use and maltreatment of animals in hauling carriages, scientific experiments (including vivisection), and cultural amusements of fox-hunting, bull-baiting and cock-fighting were among some of the matters that were debated by social reformers, clergy, and parliamentarians. Some early legislative efforts to ban practices such as bull-baiting in the English parliament were made in 1800 and 1809, the former effort led by William Johnstone Pulteney (1729–1805) and the latter by Lord Erskine (1750–1823) but the proposed Bills were defeated.

The first anti-cruelty legislation that was passed by Britain's Parliament occurred in 1822 was known as the Cruel Treatment of Cattle Act 1822 (3 Geo. 4. c. 71), and was drafted by the Irish politician and lawyer Richard Martin (1754–1834). In 1821 some sympathetic support for Martin's legislative work was centred around the efforts of Reverend Arthur Broome (1779-1837)as he had letters published in periodicals in which he canvassed for expressions of interest in forming a voluntary organisation to promote animal welfare and oppose cruelty.

In 1822, Broome attempted to form a Society for the Prevention of Cruelty to Animals that would bring together the patronage of persons who were of social rank and committed to social reforms. Broome organised and chaired a meeting of sympathisers in November 1822 where it was agreed that a Society should be created and at which Broome was named its Secretary but the attempt was short-lived.

Broome tried once more to create the Society and he invited a number of social reformers gathered on 16 June 1824 at Old Slaughter's Coffee House, London to create a Society for the Prevention of Cruelty to Animals. The meeting was chaired by Thomas Fowell Buxton MP (1786–1845) and the resolution to establish the Society was voted on. Among the others who were present as founding members were Sir James Mackintosh MP, Richard Martin, William Wilberforce, Basil Montagu, John Ashley Warre, Rev. George Bonner (1784–1840), Rev. George Avery Hatch (1757–1837), Sir James Graham, John Gilbert Meymott, William Mudford, and Lewis Gompertz. Broome was appointed as the Society's first honorary secretary. Queen Victoria bestowed the Royal Prefix in 1840.

=== Australian Colonies ===
Early concerns about the maltreatment of animals were expressed in newspaper articles and letters from correspondents in the colony of NSW in the first decade of the nineteenth century. The earliest piece of colonial legislation that carried penalties for some forms of cruelty toward animals was passed in Tasmania (then called Van Dieman's Land) in 1837. However, there was no co-ordinating body that superintended the enforcement of this early colonial legislation. Sentiments about the necessity of passing substantial anti-cruelty laws and creating organisations similar to England's RSPCA were published in the newspapers in the colonial states of NSW, Victoria, South Australia, Queensland, Tasmania and Western Australia from the 1860s until the early 1890s as each colonial state established an SPCA.

The first Society for the Prevention of Cruelty to Animals (SPCA) in Australia was formed in the colony of Victoria in 1871. This was followed by New South Wales in 1873; South Australia in 1875; Tasmania in 1878; Queensland in 1883; Western Australia in 1892; Australian Capital Territory in 1955 and Darwin in 1965.

A Women's section of the RSPCA in Australia was formed by Frances Deborah Levvy in 1882. However the British organisation disowned the connection after an Australian staff member was found guilty of extortion in 1896. Levvy persevered and the organisation was rebranded as the Women's Society for the Prevention of Cruelty to Animals.

The Royal Warrant was given to the WA SPCA in 1920 by King George V, followed by NSW SPCA in 1923, South Australia in 1937, Queensland in 1955, Tasmania in 1956 and Victoria in 1956.

=== RSPCA Australia ===
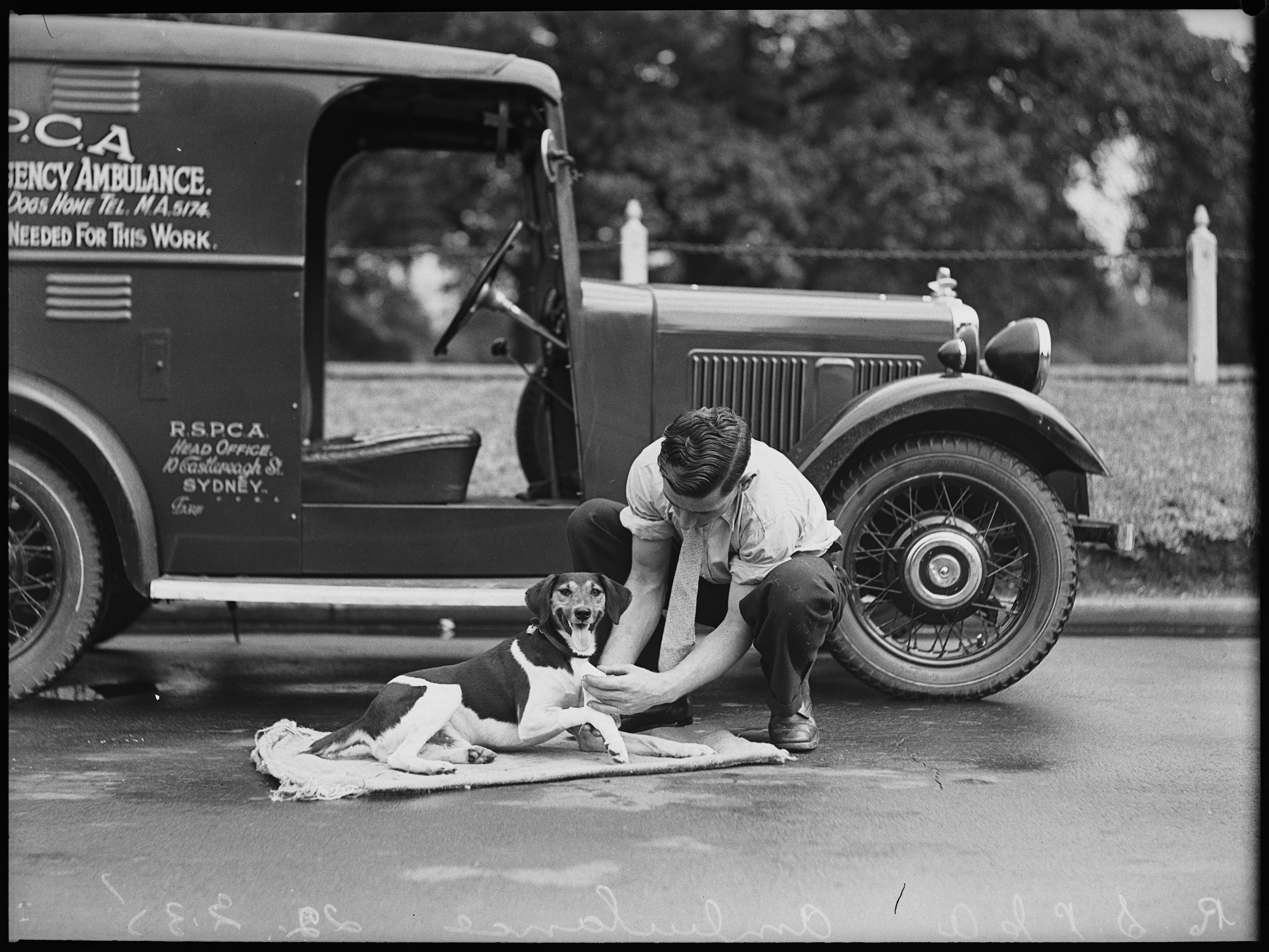
RSPCA ambulance driver with injured dog, Sydney, 1935

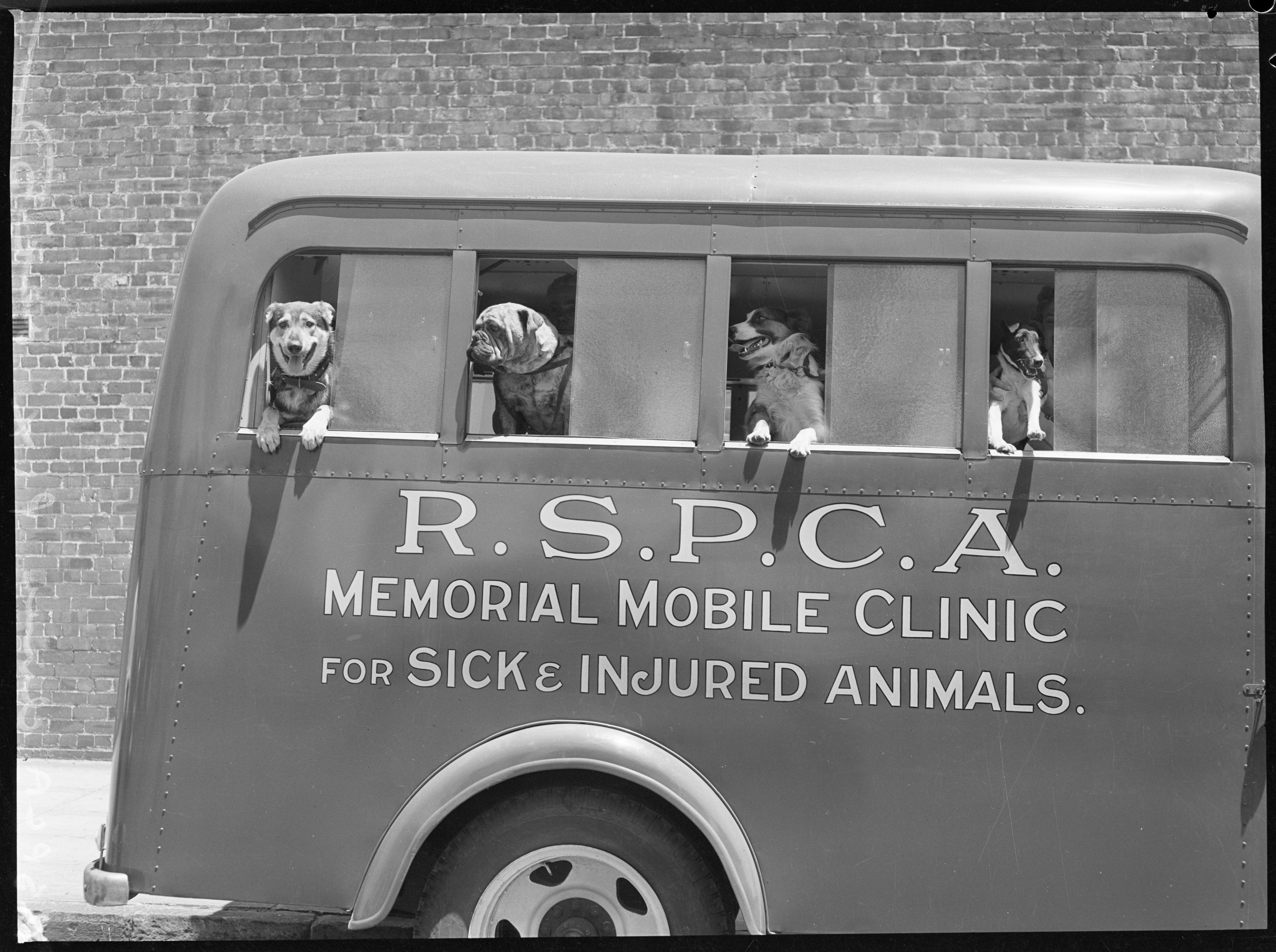
R.S.P.C.A mobile clinic, Sydney, Australia, 1952

RSPCA is a helpful resource for finding and helping animals, they treat animals if they are hurt and give them trusted owners. Since its inception the national body has had to come to grips with a range of moral reflections that have stimulated public debates in many English-speaking nations, including Australia, that are concerned with human relationships with non-human creatures. The spectrum of debates include questions about animal sentience (the capacity to experience emotions and pain), conservation and ecology, intensive agricultural farming, scientific experiments on animals, the live export trade, unlicensed puppy farms, animals used in circuses and rodeos, greyhound and horse racing, as well as issues surrounding human diets (omnivorous, vegetarian and vegan). In the academic field of legal study dubbed "animal law" there is much discussion among Australian lawyers and legal scholars about the adequacy of existing animal welfare legislation.

During the twenty-first century a widespread public debate, which has included the RSPCA Australia as a participating voice expressing alarm, about the cruel treatment of animals is in the live export trade. On this controversial issue RSPCA Australia's position has been to urge the Commonwealth government to apply and enforce stronger regulatory safeguards, as well as supporting a case for this primary industry to shift from live exports and transition to frozen food exports. On other contentious issues RSPCA Australia has advocated the abolition of battery-hen cages, stopping the use of animals to test make-up cosmetics, opposing the use of whips in horse racing, and ending jumps (or steeplechase) in horse racing.

== Purple Cross Award ==
The RSPCA Purple Cross Award was first awarded to an Australian Silky Terrier named Fizo on 25 September 1996. It was implemented to recognise the actions of animals, particularly if they have risked their life to save a person from injury or death. The award was named after the Purple Cross Society, which was established during the First World War to provide equipment for the Light Horse Brigade.

On 19 May 1997, the RSPCA posthumously awarded Private John Simpson's donkey 'Murphy', and all the other donkeys used by Simpson, the Purple Cross Award for 'the exceptional work they performed on behalf of humans while under continual fire at Gallipoli during World War 1 (1915)'. On 5 April 2011, the Australian special forces explosives detection dog 'Sarbi' also received the Purple Cross Award, at the Australian War Memorial.

== Animal welfare enforcement ==
The state and territory RSPCA entities employ inspectors who are appointed under state and territory animal welfare legislation. This legislation gives inspectors a range of powers that vary according to state or territory, primarily focused on investigating cases of animal cruelty and to enforce animal welfare law, primarily for domesticated animals. RSPCAs are in most states the only private charity with law enforcement powers.

== State branches ==
=== RSPCA Victoria ===
RSPCA Victoria was established on 4 July 1871. Its founding president was the prominent Anglican Sir William Foster Stawell (1815–1889) who served as Victoria's second Chief Justice. As of 2014 it manages 10 animal shelters across Victoria and like all other state RSPCAs besides Darwin operates an animal cruelty inspectorate on behalf of the state government. It is governed by a board of eight directors; the present President of RSPCA Victoria is Dr Hugh Wirth AM KGSJ who has held the position since 1972. The legal power that authorises Victorian RSPCA inspectors to investigate reports of animal cruelty are specified in the Prevention of Cruelty to Animals Act 1986 (as amended)

=== RSPCA New South Wales ===
RSPCA NSW is a not-for-profit charity operating in New South Wales, Australia that promotes animal welfare. The RSPCA NSW was founded in Sydney in 1873 and on Monday 28 July 1873 it was announced at a committee meeting that the Society's first President would be the prominent Anglican Sir Alfred Stephen (1802–1894) who had served as the Third Chief Justice of NSW. During his time as a member of the NSW Legislative Council, Sir Alfred Stephen attempted on four occasions to pass an animals protection bill. The legal power that authorises NSW RSPCA inspectors to investigate reports of animal cruelty are specified in the Prevention of Cruelty to Animals Act 1979 (as amended).

=== RSPCA Queensland ===
The RSPCA Queensland was originally created at a public meeting held on Monday 11 September 1876 in Brisbane's Town Hall and was chaired by Rev. W. Draper. However its activities were short-lived and a fresh attempt to restart the Society occurred at a public meeting on Friday 24 August 1883 which included the Brisbane mayor Mr Abram Robertson Byram, four Christian clergymen (Rev. M'Culloch, Griffth, Poole and Hennessey), a lawyer (A. Rutledge) and veterinarian (James Irving).

In 1888 the Society established for the education of youth the Band of Mercy and then in 1890 the Society altered its constitution to encompass both animals and children and became known as the Society for the Prevention of Cruelty. There are 3,000 volunteers across Queensland. The legal powers that authorise Queensland RSPCA inspectors to investigate reports of animal cruelty are specified in the Animal Care and Protection Act 2001.

In 2016, RSPCA Queensland was a recipient of the Queensland Greats Awards.

=== RSPCA Tasmania ===
RSPCA Tasmania (Royal Society for the Prevention of Cruelty to Animals Tasmania) is a charity and law enforcement organisation in Tasmania, Australia. It runs and maintains two (2) shelters for the rehoming of animals, a dog boarding service as well as several other programs. It is also responsible for the enforcement of animal welfare laws in Tasmania. The Society was created at a public meeting on 19 July 1878 chaired by Governor Frederick Weld (1823–1891) and other prominent figures included Sir James Milne Wilson (1812–1880) and the Anglican Dean of Hobart Rev. Henry B. Bromby (1840–1911). The legal powers that authorise Tasmania's RSPCA inspectors to investigate reports of animal cruelty are specified in the Animal Welfare Act 1993. IMPORTANT: RSPCA Inspectors gather information to present to courts in order to prosecute owners and receive legal authorisation to confiscate mistreated animals. RSPCA is NOT a vigilante organisation and can NOT work outside of the law.

=== RSPCA South Australia ===
RSPCA in South Australia was created in 1875 through the collaborative efforts of politicians, public officials, Christian clergy and churchgoers, and members of the Jewish community. A public meeting was convened at the Adelaide Town Hall on 6 December 1875 that was chaired by the mayor Sir John Colton (1823–1902) who was a renowned philanthropist and a prominent active member in the Wesleyan Methodist church. The two principal organisers of the meeting were Mr Abraham Abrahams (1813–1892), a prominent Jewish philanthropist and businessman, and Dr Robert Tracy Wylde (1811–1903).

Abrahams served as the first honorary secretary. The Society's first president was the Governor Sir Anthony Musgrave (1828–1888) who served in that position from 1875 to 1877 and was succeeded by Lieutenant-Governor Sir William F. D. Jervois who served as the President from 1877 to 1883. In 1877 one of the Society's vice-presidents was the Lord Bishop of Adelaide Right Reverend Augustus Short (1802–1883).

In 1907 several South Australian churches instituted an annual "Animal Sunday" service to promote animal welfare as well as the role of the RSPCA, and such services were still being celebrated after World War 2. In 1968 the work of the RSPCA was featured in a television film that was produced by former police prosecutor Bill Davies and was broadcast on channel 9 as a way of inviting children to participate in the Society's junior branch. The legal powers that authorise South Australia's RSPCA inspectors to investigate reports of animal cruelty are specified in the Animal Welfare Act 1985.

=== RSPCA Western Australia ===
RSPCA Western Australia was established on 2 August 1892 as the West Australian Society for the Prevention of Cruelty to Animals (SPCA), by the members of a women's reading circle. William Robinson, the Governor of Western Australia, agreed to become its patron the following year, and all subsequent governors have been patrons. The organisation hired its first full-time inspector, Titus Lander, in 1894. It was able to hire a second salaried inspector in 1906. Lander was later elected to parliament, where he secured the passage of a bill that became the Prevention of Cruelty to Animals Act 1912. The SPCA was incorporated in 1914, and in 1920 received royal patronage, becoming the RSPCA. The legal powers that authorise Western Australia's RSPCA inspectors to investigate reports of animal cruelty are specified in the Animal Welfare Act 2002.

=== RSPCA ACT ===
RSPCA ACT is governed by a board of 9 directors, elected yearly at an AGM. It operates an inspectorate to enforce animal welfare laws, a wildlife rescue and rehabilitation program, an animal shelter as well as to facilitate fundraising for a veterinary clinic, cat boarding kennels, pet supply store, puppy training school and other related services. The legal powers that authorise ACT RSPCA inspectors to investigate reports of animal cruelty are specified in the Animal Welfare Act 1992.

==== Criticism ====
RSPCA is heavily criticised by Animal Rights and Vegan groups in Australia for allowing businesses that breed animals to be killed for food to purchase 'RSPCA Approved' accreditation. This accreditation specifies certain conditions that the animals must be raised in, but opponents argue that killing animals against their will for profit is not in the animals' best interests regardless of the quality of life they have prior to being killed. Regular 'RSPCA Fail' protests have been conducted in Australian state capital cities throughout 2018 and 2019.

In October 2013 it came under fire amid allegations that it had overworked staff, underpaid them and undertook welfare practices staff believed were wrong. Nine staff (a sixth of the workforce) from the RSPCA ACT's shelter took their grievances to their union, United Voice over the issues after they claimed to have been ignored by the organisations board and the ACT government when they raised concerns as early as 2010. The involvement of their union forced an investigation by the ACT government to be launched. The CEO of RSPCA ACT resigned several days before, unrelated to the issue, but publicly defended his legacy and stated it was simply a small number of disgruntled employees.

=== RSPCA Darwin ===
Unlike other state RSPCAs, RSPCA Darwin does not cover the entire Northern Territory (dealing only with the city of Darwin) and does not possess an inspectorate (that is, animal welfare enforcement branch). It solely manages an animal shelter and attends community events and schools providing education on its mission to raise awareness about animal cruelty. It is managed by a board of 9 directors elected yearly at an AGM. Instead in the Northern Territory, animal welfare enforcement duties are specified in the Animal Welfare Act which is managed by the territory government Animal Welfare Authority.

== See also ==
- RSPCA NSW
- RSPCA Tasmania
- RSPCA Animal Rescue
- Royal New Zealand Society for the Prevention of Cruelty to Animals

General:

- Animal welfare and rights in Australia

== Bibliography ==
- "Animals Protection Bill," Illustrated Sydney News 24 July 1875, p 2. available at
- Rob Boddice, A History of Attitudes and Behaviours Toward Animals in Eighteenth- and Nineteenth-Century Britain (Lewiston, New York; Queenston, Ontario; Lampeter, Wales: Edwin Mellen Press, 2008). ISBN 978-0-7734-4903-9
- Wallace B. Budd, Hear The Other Side: The RSPCA in South Australia 1875-1988 (Hawthorndene, South Australia: Investigator Press, 1988). ISBN 0 85864 112 7
- Deborah Cao, Animal Law in Australia and New Zealand (Sydney: Thomson Reuters, 2010). ISBN 978 0 455 22618 7
- Li Chien-hui, "A Union of Christianity, Humanity, and Philanthropy: The Christian Tradition and the Prevention of Cruelty to Animals in Nineteenth-Century England," Society and Animals 8/3 (2000): 265-285.
- Edward G. Fairholme and Wellesley Pain, A Century of Work for Animals: The History of the RSPCA 1824-1934 [England] (London: John Murray, 1934).
- Hilda Kean, Animal Rights: Political and Social Change in Britain since 1800 (London: Reaktion Books, 2000). ISBN 9781861890610
- Jennifer MacCulloch, "Creatures of culture: the animal protection and preservation movements in Sydney, 1880-1930" PhD Thesis, University of Sydney 1993
- Barbara Pertzel, For All Creatures: A History of RSPCA Victoria (Burwood East, Victoria: RSPCA Victoria, 2006). ISBN 0 646 46078 1
- Stefan Petrow, "Civilizing Mission: Animal Protection in Hobart 1878-1914," Britain and the World 5 (2012): 69–95. Available to subscribers
- Peter Phillips, Humanity Dick The Eccentric Member for Galway: The Story of Richard Martin, Animal Rights Pioneer, 1754-1834 (Tunbridge Wells, Kent: Parapress, 2003). ISBN 1-898594-76-7
- Peter Sankoff & Steven White eds. Animal Law in Australasia (Sydney: Federation Press, 2009). ISBN 978 186287 719 1
- Kathryn Shevelow, For The Love of Animals: The Rise of the Animal Protection Movement (New York: Henry Holt, 2008). ISBN 978-0-8050-9024-6
- Elizabeth Webb, Three score years and ten : a human story based on the life work of the Society for the Prevention of Cruelty in Queensland, (Brisbane: Queensland Society for the Prevention of Cruelty, 1951).
- Hugh Wirth with Anne Crawford, Doctor Hugh: My Life With Animals (Sydney; Melbourne: Allen & Unwin, 2012). ISBN 978 1 74331 104 2
