= Arthur Broome =

English clergyman and animal advocate (1779–1837)

The Reverend Arthur Broome

Co-Founder and 1st Secretary of Royal Society for the Prevention of Cruelty to Animals
- In office 1824–1828

Personal details
- Born: Arthur MacLoughlin Broome; 18 February 1779 Sidmouth, Devon, England, Kingdom of Great Britain
- Died: 16 July 1837 (aged 58) Birmingham, England
- Education: Balliol College, Oxford (B.A., 1801; M.A.)
- Occupation: Priest, writer

Arthur MacLoughlin Broome (18 February 1779 – 16 July 1837) was an English clergyman and campaigner for animal welfare. He was one of a group of creators of the Royal Society for the Prevention of Cruelty to Animals (RSPCA) in 1824. Broome was appointed as the original society's first Secretary, a post he held until 1828. He held posts at various churches in London, Essex, and Kent, and supported an appeal for earthquake relief in Syria. He wrote about animal theology and also about two 17th-century English clergy. He was guarantor for the RSPCA's debts, which led to his financial ruin and in April 1826 he was sent to a debtors' prison.

== Background ==
Broome was born on 18 February 1779, the son of Thomas and Frances Broome in Sidmouth, Devon. According to university records, he matriculated from school and enrolled on 31 March 1798 at Balliol College, Oxford and he graduated with a B.A. in 1801. He subsequently was awarded an M.A.

He applied to the Bishop of London for ordination in the Church of England and on 21 November 1802 was ordained by Bishop Beilby Porteus as a deacon. Porteus was an evangelical church reformer and a noted anti-slavery campaigner. Broome's association with Porteus no doubt brought him into a network of contacts with similarly minded individuals. After a year's service in the role of a deacon, Broome was then ordained as a priest by Bishop Porteus on 18 December 1803. His first appointment as a priest was to the parish church, St. Peter's Church situated in Roydon, Essex. His next parish appointment was on 7 March 1812 as a licensed curate to serve two churches, both named St. Mary's, in neighbouring villages, Hinxhill and Brook, situated in Kent. On 6 March 1816, he was appointed as a curate to St. Helen's church in Cliffe at Hoo, Kent. Broome remained in Cliffe until he was appointed as a stipendiary curate to St. Mary's Church, Bromley St Leonard's (now called Bromley by Bow) on 23 April 1819. A year later he was appointed as a perpetual curate at this church and he remained in this position until he resigned on 13 February 1824.

Broome was active in serving the Bromley parish and he came into contact with people who were labourers employed in the warehouses of the East India Company. In December 1822, he wrote to the company's directors seeking their financial support for an additional weekly church service. Broome also demonstrated practical care and concern for the victims of a major earthquake that struck Syria (then part of the Ottoman Empire) and in April 1823 preached a sermon for the purpose of raising funds for victim relief.

== Marriage ==
Broome was married to Anna Barne Trollope on 1 May 1817 at St. Margaret's Church, Rochester, Kent. Anna was born on 6 August 1790 in Huntingdon the eldest child born to Lieutenant Colonel Thomas Trollope (1757–1805) of the Royal Marines and Anna Steel (1771–1845). Her grandfather was Rev. John Trollope, her great-great-grandfather was the third baronet of Casewick, Sir Thomas Trollope and she was an older cousin of the novelist Anthony Trollope. Some years after her birth, her parents and siblings were relocated from Huntingdon to Rochester, Kent close to where Trollope's military unit was stationed, and Lieutenant-Colonel Trollope died suddenly in 1805 in Somerset while en route to his unit. Anna's brother George Trollope held the rank of Lieutenant in the Royal Navy but died of consumption (tuberculosis) on 4 August 1837. Anna's wider family included several cousins who were ordained clergy in the Church of England. Broome and his wife Anna had one daughter, Maria Anna Broome.

== Writing ==
In 1815, Broome compiled a work about two seventeenth-century Church of England clergy, Thomas Fuller and Robert South which consisted of selected excerpts from their writings as well as a short biographical profile of Fuller. Two years later, he reissued the text, which was expanded to include a biographical profile on South. The Gentleman's Magazine carried a positive review of Broome's book. Broome dedicated this book to the law reformer Basil Montagu who was also a fan of the writings of Fuller and South. Broome also edited and annotated an important eighteenth-century text in animal theology, A Dissertation on the Duty of Mercy and Sin of Cruelty to Brute Animals (1776), that was written by Rev. Humphrey Primatt.

== RSPCA founder ==
The era in which he lived as well as his personal convictions formed the basis of Broome's role as a campaigner on behalf of animal welfare. The eighteenth and nineteenth century intellectual climate in Britain concerning the use of animals is reflected in different schools of thought that developed around theological, philosophical and moral reflections. Some clergy of the late eighteenth century expressed the theological view that the maltreatment of animals was sinful, linking this view to biblical passages denouncing cruelty (e.g. Proverbs 12:10; Numbers 22:21-34) and with passages of mercy (Matthew 5:7), as well as on the grounds that non-human creatures have the capacity for feeling pain. Representatives of this view include the eighteenth century preachers John Wesley, Augustus Montagu Toplady, James Granger, and Humphry Primatt. Others, such as Richard Dean, added to the anti-cruelty argument based on reflections about the resurrection of Jesus having a positive effect on the problem of evil in its impact on the creation (Romans 8:19–22) and leading to a future resurrection for non-human creatures.

At the time when Broome was a youth and then a student at university, there was a moral groundswell that was opposed to bull-baiting and that resulted in an unsuccessful attempt by William Johnstone Pulteney on 18 April 1800 to pass legislation through England's Parliament to ban the practice. A subsequent attempt to pass anti-cruelty legislation was led by Lord Erskine (1750-1823) in the House of Lords in 1809 but it was defeated by opponents in the House of Commons. Erskine in his speech on behalf of the Bill combined the vocabulary of animal rights and trusteeship with a theological appeal to biblical passages opposing cruelty.

Broome expressed an interest in promoting the welfare of animals by opposing acts of cruelty through publishing anonymously a sermon in 1801 "Unjustifiableness of Cruelty to the Brute Creation." Passages from this sermon were later reproduced in some of Broome's notes to the abridged version of Primatt's book. Broome's interest in creating an organisation to promote animal welfare and oppose cruelty was apparent in a letter of his that was published in The Kaleidoscope on 6 March 1821 that asked for information about the existence of an anti-cruelty organisation that may have been operating in Liverpool. Another piece of evidence concerns a notice that appeared in various newspapers and that was signed under the pseudonym "Clerus":

An Individual who feels for the sufferings of the Brute Species, and laments, in common with every benevolent mind, the wanton cruelties which are so frequently committed with impunity on this unoffending part of God's Creation, earnestly appeals to the Public in their behalf. He suggests the formation of a Society by whose united exertions some check may, if possible, be applied to an evil, the toleration of which is equally repugnant to the dictates of humanity and to the spirit and precepts of the Christian religion. Persons whose sentiments accord with those of the Writer, on this subject, and who are willing to promote the object he recommends, are requested to address a few lines (free of postage), to "Clerus", 25, Ivy-lane, Paternoster-row."

Kathryn Shevelow has noted that "Clerus" (Latin word clergy; so too "Clericus") was most likely Arthur Broome and that as people began submitting correspondence to periodicals expressing alarm about cruelty toward animals that there emerged a consensus on the need for such like-minded persons to collaborate. The creation of voluntary groups that agitated for legal and social reform through the patronage of aristocrats, clergy and parliamentarians was not unusual in Broome's day, particularly in the case of the abolitionist or anti-slavery movement. After the passage of Richard Martin's anti-cruelty to cattle bill in 1822, Broome attempted to form a Society for the Prevention of Cruelty to Animals that would bring together the patronage of persons who were of social rank and committed to social reforms. Broome did organise and chair a meeting of sympathisers in November 1822 where it was agreed that a Society should be created and at which Broome was named its Secretary. However, the venture was short-lived and Broome redoubled his efforts two years later with a successful relaunch of the Society.

The maltreatment of cattle at the Smithfield Market prompted Elizabeth Heyrick in 1823 to publish anonymously a stinging rebuke to those acting cruelly as well as to what she perceived was an apparent lack of punitive action taken against the perpetrators. Heyrick's short work began with strong words directed at the supporters of Martin's Act for not prosecuting those who abused animals. However she seemed to be unaware that Broome had in 1822 already personally brought to court some individuals against whom charges of cruelty were heard. He also from his own pocket paid the salary for an inspector to monitor the abuse of animals at the Smithfield Market.

Broome felt financially secure due to his curate's stipend, the income he received from the sale of his book on Fuller and South, as well as due to an indenture agreement that had been reached between his mother-in-law, his wife and himself that was signed in 1819. From 1822 to 1823 he was busy raising funds for the planned anti-cruelty Society through the republication of earlier texts in animal theology. He resigned as perpetual curate in Bromley in February 1824. It was at Broome's invitation that a number of social reformers gathered on 16 June 1824 at Old Slaughter's Coffee House, London to create a Society for the Prevention of Cruelty to Animals. The meeting was chaired by Thomas Fowell Buxton MP (1786-1845) and the resolution to establish the Society was voted on. Among the others who were present as founding members were Sir James Mackintosh MP, Richard Martin, William Wilberforce, Basil Montagu, John Ashley Warre, Rev. George Bonner (1784–1840), Rev. George Avery Hatch (1757–1837), Sir James Graham, John Gilbert Meymott, William Mudford, and Lewis Gompertz. Broome was appointed as the Society's first honorary secretary.

At the inaugural meeting Broome indicated that "every method should be resorted to for the purpose of directing the public attention to the subject; that tracts and sermons should be published, to effect a change in the moral feelings of those who had the control of animals." He set up an office at The Quadrant, 72 Regent Street, London. During his service as the Society's secretary Broome organised the publishing of the Society's prospectus, various pamphlets and books dealing with the problem of cruelty, as well as urging other clergy to preach anti-cruelty sermons. The first annual anti-cruelty sermon that was preached on behalf of the Society was delivered by Rev Dr James Rudge (1785–1852) in March 1827 at the Whitechapel Church. The Rev Thomas Greenwood delivered a sermon on behalf of the Society on 26 September 1829 at the Church of St. Mary Somerset in Upper Thames Street, London based on the theme of being merciful. The use of an inspector at the Smithfield Market continued as part of the Society's operations.

During 1825, Broome prepared for the first annual meeting of the Society which was held at the Crown and Anchor Tavern on 29 June 1825 and the public notice specifically included appropriate accommodation for the presence of women members. Several women of social standing were listed as patronesses such as the Duchess of Buccleuch, Dowager Marchioness of Salisbury, Dowager Countess Harcourt, Lady Emily Pusey, Lady Eyre and Lady Mackintosh. At this meeting Richard Martin contradicted the impression held in public circles that he had founded the Society: "I have nothing at all to do with it," he said "it is quite a child of Mr Broome's and he has acted the part of a good father to it." Broome also sought that year to develop an anti-vivisection position and requested written advice from several medical practitioners concerning the efficacy of surgical or laboratory experiments on animals and received letters that did not support vivisection.

Unfortunately for Broome, he was the guarantor for the Society's debts. When the debts exceeded the Society's revenue he was held liable in April 1826 and was sentenced in a hearing at the King's Bench to serve time in the debtors' prison. By June 1826, he was free from the prison as his colleagues Richard Martin and Lewis Gompertz raised funds to cover the unpaid debts. The Society's activities were reduced as the raising of revenue became a primary concern. In 1827 Broome sought to galvanize interest in the Society's work by proposing an annual lecture opposing cruelty in Liverpool.

By March 1828, Broome was replaced as the Society's secretary largely owing to his family circumstances and his loss of income. He remained a member and attended some committee meetings from 1828 through to 1832. At a committee meeting on 13 January 1832, Broome was reappointed as a committee member.

== Decline and death ==
Broome's experience of bankruptcy had a serious impact on his wife Anna and their daughter, which appears to have resulted in the couple living apart. Anna's mother and sister Frances moved from England to France in late 1833 and it is possibly the case that Anna and her daughter joined them. Evidence for the harm caused by Broome's bankruptcy is apparent in the wording of the last will and testament of Anna's sister Frances Trollope dated 12 November 1833, in which Anna is named as a substitute beneficiary to a life-interest "for her sole and separate use and not be subject to the control of her present or any future husband." In January 1834 Broome was distressed to the point where one evening he was found inebriated and rolling in mud in York Street, Westminster by a police officer. When Broome appeared before the magistrate on the charge of being drunk and disorderly he acknowledged he had been "unsettled in his mind" and "drank too much."

In 1837, Broome was living in Birmingham where he had acted in the role of a minister in "a chapel of ease" but he suffered from consumption (tuberculosis) and died alone on 16 July 1837. He was buried on 21 July 1837 in an unmarked pauper's grave in the grounds of St Philip's Cathedral, Birmingham. Three years after his death Queen Victoria bestowed the official royal patronage on the Society so that it became known thereafter as the Royal Society for the Prevention of Cruelty to Animals. John Lawrence (1753-1839), an early advocate of animal rights, described Broome as the Society's "humane and zealous founder." Five years before his death The London Literary Gazette drew attention to a fresh release of Broome's edited book (abridging Primatt) The Duty of Humanity to Inferior Creatures, and paid him this kind tribute:

Mr. Broome is the founder of the Society for the Prevention of Cruelty to Animals; the very establishment is a proof of, and honour to, the advance of civilisation. Any thing from so earnest a friend of so good a cause must be acceptable.

The RSPCA in England presents awards and honours annually with a category of awards related to the Society's founders. The "Bronze Honour" is named after Arthur Broome and is awarded to either an individual or organisation that has contributed in an outstanding manner to animal welfare.

== Bibliography ==
- Rob Boddice, A History of Attitudes and Behaviours Toward Animals in Eighteenth- And Nineteenth-Century Britain: Anthropocentrism and the Emergence of Animals (Lewiston, New York; Queenston, Ontario; Lampeter, Wales: Edwin Mellen Press, 2008). ISBN 978-0-7734-4903-9
- Antony Brown, Who Cares For Animals? (London: Heinemann, 1974).
- Li Chien-hui, "A Union of Christianity, Humanity, and Philanthropy: The Christian Tradition and the Prevention of Cruelty to Animals in Nineteenth-Century England," Society and Animals 8/3 (2000): 265-285.
- Edward G. Fairholme and Wellesley Pain, A Century of Work For Animals: The History of the RSPCA, 1824-1934 (London: John Murray, 1934).
- Harrison, Brian (1973). "Animals and the State in nineteenth-century England". The English Historical Review: 786–820. doi:10.1093/ehr/LXXXVIII.CCCXLIX.786.
- John Hostettler, Thomas Erskine and Trial By Jury (Hook, Hampshire: Waterside Press, 2010). ISBN 9781904380 597
- Hilda Kean, Animal Rights: Political and Social Change in Britain since 1800 (London: Reaktion Books, 2000). ISBN 9781861890610
- "Broome, Arthur MacLoughlin [Arthur Eugenius] (1779–1837), animal welfare campaigner". Oxford Dictionary of National Biography (online ed.). Oxford University Press. 2004. doi:10.1093/ref:odnb/38498. (Subscription, Wikipedia Library access or UK public library membership required.)
- Philip Johnson, "Reverend Arthur Broome and the RSPCA," CASE no. 58 (2020) 12–17.https://www.case.edu.au/products/reverend-arthur-broome-and-the-rspca-philip-johnson
- Andrew Linzey, "Arthur Broome," in Marc Bekoff with Carron A. Meaney eds. Encyclopedia of Animal Rights and Animal Welfare (Westport, Connecticut: Greenwood Press, 1998), pp 95–96. ISBN 0-313-29977-3
- Shevawn Lynam, Humanity Dick Martin 'King of Connemara' 1754-1834 (Dublin: Lilliput Press, 1989). ISBN 0 946640 36 X
- Arthur W. Moss, Valiant Crusade: The History of the RSPCA (London: Cassell, 1961).
- Charles D. Niven, History of the Humane Movement (New York: Transatlantic Arts, 1967).
- Stefan Petrow, "Civilizing Mission: Animal Protection in Hobart 1878-1914," Britain and the World 5 (2012): 69–95. Available to subscribers
- Harriet Ritvo, The Animal Estate: The English and Other Creatures in the Victorian Age (Cambridge, Massachusetts: Harvard University Press, 1987). ISBN 0-674-03707-3
- M. J. D. Roberts, Making English Morals: Voluntary Associations and Moral Reform in England, 1787-1886 (Cambridge: Cambridge University Press, 2004). ISBN 0 521 83389 2
- Richard D. Ryder, Animal Revolution: Changing Attitudes Towards Speciesism, Rev Ed (Oxford; New York: Berg, 2000). ISBN 978-1-85973-330-1
- Kathryn Shevelow, For the Love of Animals: The Rise of the Animal Protection Movement (New York: Henry Holt, 2008). ISBN 978-0-8050-9024-6
- James Turner, Reckoning with the Beast: Animals, Pain, and Humanity in the Victorian Mind (Baltimore; London: Johns Hopkins University Press, 1980). ISBN 0-8018-2399-4
