= Richard Martin (Irish politician) =

Irish politician & activist (1754–1834)

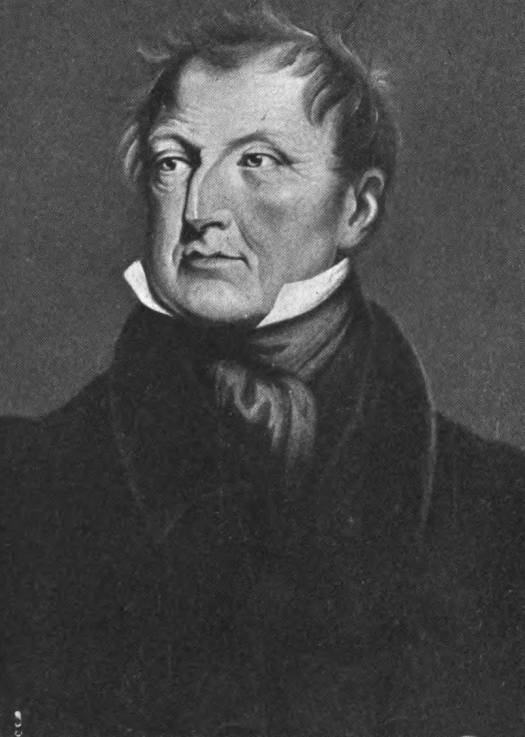

Member of Parliament for County Galway
- In office 1818–1826 Serving with James Daly

Member of Parliament for County Galway
- In office 1801–1812 Serving with Richard Le Poer Trench 1801–1805; Denis Bowes Daly 1805–1812

Member of Parliament for County Galway
- In office 1800–1801

Member of Parliament for Lanesborough
- In office 1798–1800

Member of Parliament for Jamestown
- In office 1776–1783

Personal details
- Born: 17 January 1754 Dangan, County Galway, Ireland
- Died: 6 January 1834 (aged 79) Boulogne-sur-Mer, France
- Party: Independent
- Other political affiliations: Patriot Party (1776–83)
- Spouse(s): Hon. Elizabeth Vesey (divorced 1791); Harriet Evans Martin (m. 1794)
- Education: Harrow School
- Alma mater: Trinity College, Cambridge
- Occupation: Politician, animal welfare campaigner

Military service
- Allegiance: Ireland
- Branch/service: Yeomanry; Irish Volunteers
- Rank: Colonel
- Unit: Ballynahinch Yeomanry; County Galway Volunteers

Colonel Richard Martin (15 January 1754 – 6 January 1834), was an Irish politician and campaigner against cruelty to animals. He was known as Humanity Dick, a nickname bestowed on him by King George IV. He succeeded in getting the pioneering Cruel Treatment of Cattle Act 1822, nicknamed 'Martin's Act', passed into British law.

== Early life ==
Martin was born at Dangan in County Galway, the only son of Robert Martin FitzAnthony of Birch Hall, County Galway, and Bridget Barnwall, a daughter of Robert Barnewall, 12th Baron Trimlestown. He was raised at Dangan House, situated on the Corrib River, four miles upriver from the town of Galway. His father's family were Jacobites and one of "The Tribes of Galway," fourteen merchant families who ruled Galway from the 14th to 17th centuries. The Barnwalls were an ennobled family of Norman descent based in the counties of Dublin, Kildare and Meath in Leinster. Bridget Barnwall died when Richard was nine years old. Richard's father later married Mary Lynch, a member of another "Tribal" family, with whom he had sons Robert and Anthony. Though both of his parents were born to Catholics, Richard Martin was raised a Protestant and educated in England and later became a wealthy landlord in Ireland.

He studied at Harrow and then after some tutelage for exams to gain admission at Trinity College, Cambridge, he "was admitted a gentleman-commoner at Trinity on 4 March 1773." Martin did not graduate with a degree but studied for admission to the bar and was admitted to Lincoln's Inn on 1 February 1776. He served as a lawyer in Ireland and became High Sheriff of Galway in 1782.

In the Londonderry Journal of 13 June 1786, it was reported that Martin's black slave boy, reputedly the son of a west African king, was permitted to resign from Martin's service after his father had died and he was recalled to succeed to the throne.

== Adult life ==
Martin entered the Irish House of Commons in 1776, sitting for Jamestown until 1783. After a break of fifteen years, he was returned to Parliament for Lanesborough in 1798, promoting Catholic Emancipation. Just before the Act of Union dissolved the Irish Parliament and obliged Irish MPs to sit in the Parliament of the United Kingdom, he was elected for County Galway. He continued to represent County Galway in Westminster as a political independent until 1812 and again from 1818, supporting the Tory government of Lord Liverpool. In the House of Commons he was known for his interruptions and humorous speeches. He continued his work towards Irish Catholic Emancipation till 1826, when he had to flee to France. Emancipation was finally granted in 1829, much to his delight. He was also "a member of the Society for the amelioration and gradual abolition of Slavery throughout the British Dominions which had been formed in 1823."

== Anti-animal cruelty and RSPCA ==
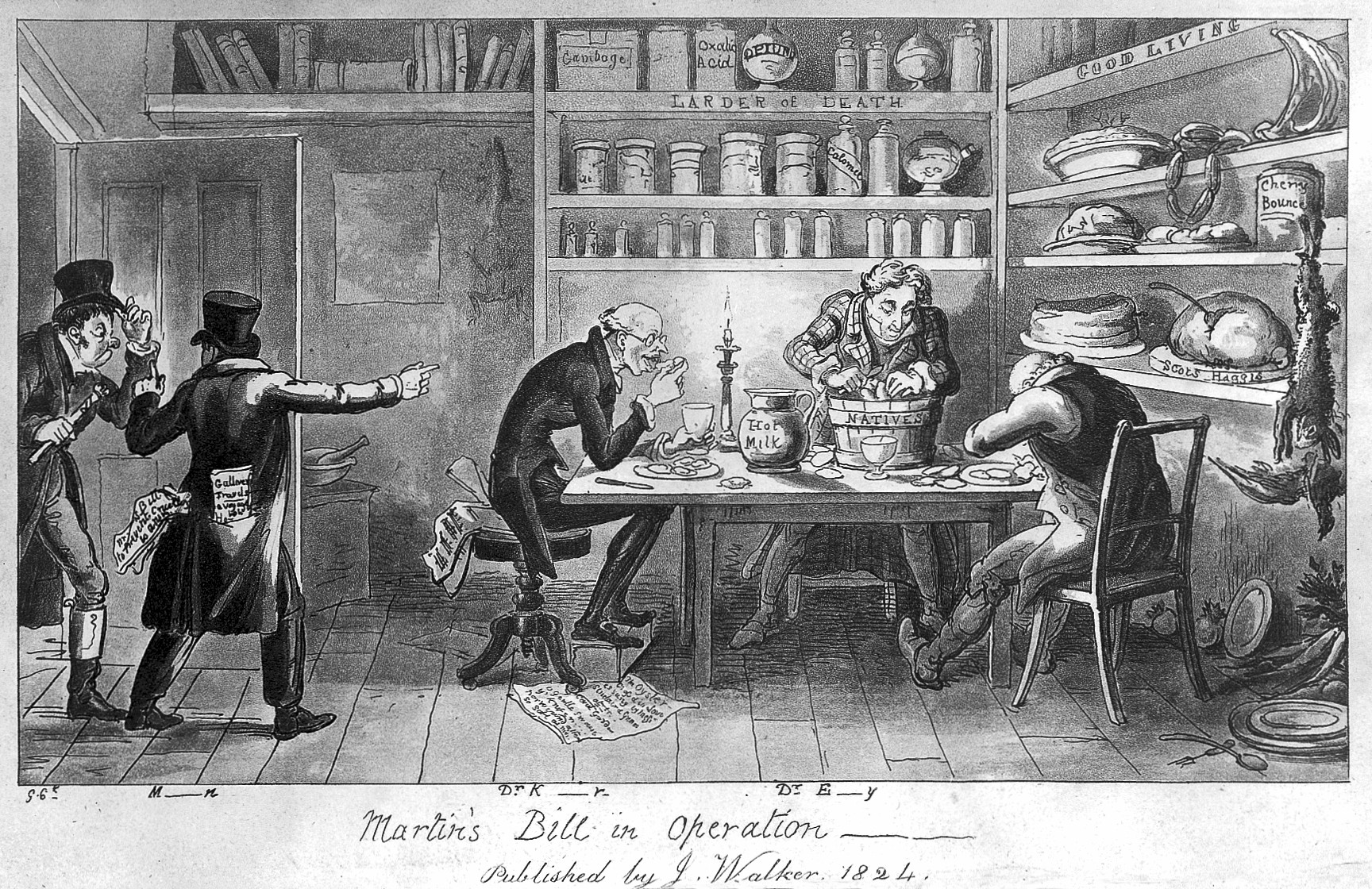
Caricature of Richard Martin, W. Kitchiner, Samuel Phillips Eady: Martin's Bill in Operation (published 1824).

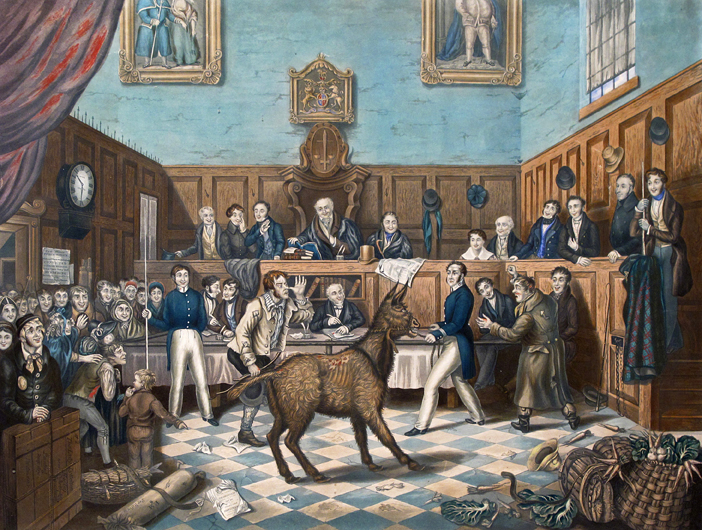
A painting of the Trial of Bill Burns, showing Richard Martin with the donkey in an astonished courtroom, leading to the world's first known conviction for animal cruelty, a story that delighted London's newspapers and music halls

Martin is now best known for his work against animal cruelty, especially against bear baiting and dog fighting. Martin's attempt to have an anti-cruelty-to-animals bill passed stands in a chronological line with some previous failed efforts in England's Parliament. A sympathetic groundswell of public opinion emerged in the late 18th and early 19th century in opposition to cultural amusements such as bull-baiting and cock-fighting and in the visible maltreatment of animals that were herded in for slaughter at London's Smithfield Market. The first unsuccessful legislative attempt was led by William Johnstone Pulteney on 18 April 1800 to ban bull-baiting but it was lost to the opposition vote in the House of Commons. A renewed effort was undertaken in 1809 with an anti-cruelty bill introduced into the House of Lords by Lord Erskine (1750–1823) which passed in that House but was defeated by a vote in the House of Commons. Martin voted in favour of both Pulteney's and Erskine's bills.

Martin drafted a new bill in consultation with the then retired Lord Erskine as well as with the agricultural writer and animal rights advocate John Lawrence (1753-1839)., entitled the "Ill Treatment of Cattle Bill". The bill passed in the House of Commons by twenty-nine to eighteen votes, then through the House of Lords and was signed by the king, becoming the Cruel Treatment of Cattle Act 1822 on 21 June 1822. He also tried to spread his ideas in the streets of London, becoming the target of jokes and political cartoons that depicted him with the ears of a donkey. He also sometimes paid fines of minor offenders. In May 1824 he attempted to widen the scope of anti-cruelty legislation by introducing the Slaughtering of Horses Bill which would have obliged licensed slaughterhouses to keep proper records of food allocated to each horse and with penalties applied to those using a horse that had a disabled limb to haul carts. This bill was defeated on 15 June 1824.

In 1821 letters were exchanged by various correspondents in periodicals raising concerns about the maltreatment of animals, which included one written by Rev. Arthur Broome that was published in The Kaleidoscope on 6 March 1821. Broome attempted to bring together the patronage of persons who were of social rank and committed to social reforms and he chaired a meeting that was held in November 1822 to create a Society for the Prevention of Cruelty to Animals. This initial attempt however faltered and a fresh attempt to launch the society was organized by Broome at a meeting on 16 June 1824 at Old Slaughter's Coffee House, London. Broome invited various clergy, lawyers and parliamentarians to vote on the resolution to create the Society and among those present were Thomas Fowell Buxton MP (1786-1845), William Wilberforce (1759-1833), Richard Martin, Sir James Mackintosh MP, Basil Montagu, William Mudford, Rev. George Avery Hatch (1757-1837), Rev George Bonner (1784-1840), Sir James Graham, J. G. Meymott, John Ashley Warre and Lewis Gompertz. Broome was elected as the society's first honorary secretary.

In 1824–1825 Martin also became involved in the emerging British controversy over vivisection. The controversy was catalysed by the visit to London of the French physiologist François Magendie, whose demonstrations of experiments on living animals before large medical audiences provoked widespread criticism. A particularly notorious demonstration at the Windmill Street anatomy school involved a live dog being forcibly restrained on a dissecting table and subjected to extensive operations on the nerves of its face. Contemporary accounts emphasized the extreme and prolonged suffering of the animal, and reports of the demonstration caused an outcry that has been identified as an important starting point of the organized British anti-vivisection movement.

In February 1825 Martin brought the affair before the House of Commons, describing Magendie's experiments as involving "excessive and protracted cruelty" and reporting that leading British medical authorities also condemned them. Martin nevertheless acknowledged that some experiments on living animals could be necessary, provided that suffering was minimized. Returning to the subject in March, he distinguished experiments aimed at discovering something materially beneficial to humanity from Magendie's London demonstrations, which he alleged merely repeated experiments already performed in Paris and were exhibited for "dramatic effect".

Due to Martin's profile as a politician and as the drafter of the anti-cruelty legislation, a public perception developed that he was the initiator and creator of the Society for the Prevention of Cruelty to Animals. At the Society's first anniversary meeting Martin set the public record straight and gave credit to Rev Broome by stating: "I have nothing at all to do with it," he said "it is quite a child of Mr. Broome's and he has acted the part of a good father to it." During 1826 the society's debts became greater than its revenue, and Broome as the society's guarantor was sentenced by the Kings Bench to the debtors' prison, and Martin and Gompertz raised funds to cover the debts and obtain Broome's release. Martin maintained an interest in the Society even after he left England and resettled in France.

== Active life ==
Martin also had a very eventful life. He was a colonel of the County Galway Volunteers. He survived two shipwrecks. He fought over a hundred duels with sword and pistol and earned the nickname "Hairtrigger Dick". He travelled extensively in Europe and the Americas during the 1770s and was in New England when the American Revolutionary War began. He initiated Galway's first theatre in 1783.

Martin was on a first-name basis with many of the famous names of his age, including King George IV (who gave him the nickname "Humanity Dick"), Henry Flood, Henry Grattan, William Pitt, Queen Caroline, and Daniel O'Connell. Despite his nickname he was considered a very harsh landlord in Ireland.

On his death in 1834 his son Thomas became his heir. A workhouse was built on his estate during the Irish famine. Although the workhouse was an apparent pledge to help the poor suffering from starvation, it is agreed that Thomas and his family did little to help and approximately 150,000 people died on their land during this period from starvation and fever. Most of Martin's estate (approx. 200,000 acres (809 km^{2})) was in the west of Ireland and this area had one of the highest death tolls during the Famine.

== Unseating and escape ==
After the election of 1826, Martin (now a heavy gambler) lost his parliamentary seat because of a petition which accused him of illegal voter intimidation during the election. He had to flee into hasty exile to Boulogne, France, because he could no longer invoke parliamentary immunity to avoid arrest for debt. He died there peacefully in the presence of his second wife and their three daughters on 6 January 1834.

== Family ==
Martin's first wife was the Honourable Elizabeth Vesey, a daughter of Lord Trimlestown. They had nine children, of whom only three survived childhood. His daughter, Mary, was born in 1783. Her brothers were Thomas B. Martin (1786–1847) and St. George (died 1805). Following the revelation of her affair with a Mr. Petrie in Paris, Martin sued Petrie for criminal conversation in 1791 and was awarded £10,000. He had this distributed to the poor by throwing it out the windows of his coach on the long journey back from London to Galway.

In 1793, he married the novelist Harriet Evans Martin in Nenagh. They had four surviving children, including Rev. Richard Martin (1797–1878) and the writer Harriet Letitia Martin (1801–1891). The former emigrated to Canada in 1834 and had descendants who included D'Arcy Argue Counsell Martin (c. 1899–1992). During the period of the family's exile in Boulogne they became well acquainted with the poet Sarah Burdett (herself a relative of Baroness Burdett-Coutts 1814–1906) and she wrote a poem on 12 April 1834 expressing admiration and blessings on Mary Jane Martin (Richard's daughter born in 1810). Burdett was an early supporter of the RSPCA and had her views published in 1839 in The Rights of Animals.

== Notes ==
Parliament of Ireland
Preceded by James Browne; John FitzGibbon	Member of Parliament for Jamestown; 1776–1783; With: Viscount Westport 1776–1781; John Hall	Succeeded by Sir Francis Hutchinson; Henry Bruen
Preceded by Edmond Stanley; John La Touche	Member of Parliament for Lanesborough; 1798–1800; With: Edmond Stanley	Succeeded by Edmond Stanley; John Kelly
Preceded by Hon. Richard Trench; Joseph Blake	Member of Parliament for County Galway; 1800 – 1801; With: Joseph Blake	Succeeded by Parliament of the United Kingdom
Parliament of the United Kingdom
Preceded by Parliament of Ireland	Member of Parliament for County Galway; 1801 – 1812; With: Richard Le Poer Trench 1801–1805; Denis Bowes Daly 1805–1812	Succeeded by Denis Bowes Daly; James Daly
Preceded by Denis Bowes Daly; James Daly	Member of Parliament for County Galway; 1818 – 1826; With: James Daly	Succeeded by James Staunton Lambert; James Daly
