= Basil Montagu =

British jurist and barrister

Basil Montagu (24 April 1770 – 27 November 1851) was a British jurist, barrister, writer and philanthropist. He was educated at Charterhouse and studied law at Cambridge. He was significantly involved in reforms to bankruptcy laws of Britain. He served as Accountant-General in Bankruptcy between 1835 and 1846. He was highly influenced by the writings of Francis Bacon. He was the son of John Montagu, 4th Earl of Sandwich, and his mistress, singer Martha Ray.

== Life ==
He was the second illegitimate son of John Montagu by Martha Ray; he was acknowledged by his father, and brought up at Hinchingbrooke, Huntingdonshire. He was educated at Charterhouse School and Christ's College, Cambridge, where he matriculated in 1786, graduated B.A. (fifth wrangler) in 1790, and proceeded to obtain an M.A. in 1793. On 30 January 1789 he was admitted as a member of Gray's Inn, but continued to reside at Cambridge until 1795, when, having by a technical loophole lost the portion of inheritance intended for him by his father, he came to London to read for the bar.

He was on intimate terms with Samuel Taylor Coleridge and William Wordsworth, whose early enthusiasm for the ideas of the French Revolution he shared. In the autumn of 1797 he made a tour in the Midlands counties with William Godwin. He spent a week in Godwin's house in 1797, assisting the distraught Godwin, whose wife Mary Wollstonecraft was dying, following the birth of a daughter.

He was called to the bar on 19 May 1798. By Sir James Mackintosh, whose acquaintance he soon afterwards made, and with whom he went the Norfolk circuit, he was converted to political moderation and the study of Francis Bacon. Montagu was also a friend of Samuel Parr. Montagu never became eminent as a pleader, but he gradually acquired a practice in chancery and bankruptcy; his leisure time he devoted to legal and literary work.

Appointed by Lord Erskine, 1806–7, to a commissionership in bankruptcy, Montagu set himself to reform the bankruptcy law. He also founded in 1808 the Society for the Diffusion of Knowledge upon the Punishment of Death, with William Allen. In July 1825 he gave evidence before the chancery commission, and suggested a radical reform. In Trinity term 1835 Montagu was made K.C., and soon afterwards accountant-general in bankruptcy. His tenure of this office, which lasted until 1846, he established the liability of the Bank of England to pay interest on bankruptcy deposits. He was a member of the Athenæum Club, and his town house, 25 Bedford Square, was for many years a centre of reunion for London literary society. He was one of the most attentive listeners to Coleridge's monologues at Highgate. He died at Boulogne-sur-Mer on 27 November 1851.

== Founder Member of RSPCA ==
Along with Sir James Mackintosh, Thomas Fowell Buxton, William Wilberforce, Richard Martin MP and the Reverend Arthur Broome, Montagu attended a meeting on 16 June 1824 at Old Slaughter's Coffee House in St. Martin's Lane, London that created the Society for the Prevention of Cruelty to Animals (in 1840 by royal assent from Queen Victoria it became the RSPCA). Montagu was one of eleven members that formed a sub-committee to "superintend the Publication of Tracts, Sermons, and similar modes of influencing public opinion" about the humane treatment of animals. Montagu was a friend of Revd Broome for many years before the SPCA was founded. In 1815 Broome dedicated his book Selections from the Works of Fuller and South, with Life and Character of Fuller to Montagu.

== Works ==
In 1801 Montagu published A Summary of the Law of Set Off, with an Appendix of Cases argued and determined in the Courts of Law and Equity upon that subject, London, on an intricate branch of the law; and between 1805 and 1807 compiled A Digest of the Bankrupt Laws, with a Collection of the Cases argued and determined in the Courts of Law and Equity upon that subject, London, 4 vols. In 1809 he published An Enquiry respecting the Expediency of Limiting the Creditor's power to refuse a Bankrupt's Certificate, London; in 1810 an Enquiry respecting the Mode of Issuing Commissions in Bankruptcy, London, a protest against the practice then in vogue of initiating bankruptcy proceedings by means of secret commissions; and in 1811 Enquiries respecting the Administration of Bankrupts' Estates by Assignees, London.

He published in 1809 a volume of selections entitled The Opinions of different Authors upon the Punishment of Death, London; and in subsequent years a variety of pamphlets on the same topic. In 1813 appeared his Enquiries respecting the Proposed Alteration of the Law of Copyright as it affects Authors and Universities, London; in 1815 A Digest of the Law of Partnership, with a Collection of Cases decided in the Courts of Law and Equity, London, 2 vols; and in 1816 Enquiries respecting the Insolvent Debtors' Bill, with the Opinions of Dr. Paley, Mr. Burke, and Dr. Johnson upon Imprisonment for Debt, London. A Summary of the Law of Lien followed, and Suggestions respecting the Improvement of the Bankrupt Laws in 1821, London; Some Observations upon the Bill for the Improvement of the Bankrupt Laws in 1822, London; A Summary of the Law of Composition with Creditors in 1823, London; and A Digest of Pleading in Equity, with Notes of the Cases decided in different Courts of Equity upon that subject, in 1824, London, 2 vols.

In 1825 he exposed the delay and expense involved in the existing bankruptcy procedure in Inquiries respecting the Courts of Commissioners of Bankrupts and Lord Chancellor's Court, London. In 1826 he edited The Evidence in Bankruptcy before the Chancery Commission, with the Report, London; and in 1826–7 published two Letters on the Report of the Chancery Commissioners to the Right Honourable Robert Peel, London. He also published in 1827 Observations upon the Act for Consolidating the Bankrupt Laws, London; Reform, London (a tract mainly relating to bankruptcy); and with Francis Gregg A Digest of the Bankrupt Laws as altered by the New Statutes, London, 2 vols. Letters on the Bankrupt Laws to Edward Burtenshaw Sugden, Esq. (Sugden was later Lord St. Leonards), followed in 1829; and in 1831 The New Bankrupt Court Act, arranged with a copious Index and Observations upon the Erroneous Principle on which it is Founded, London, 1831.

In 1837 Montagu published, with Scrope Ayrton, The Law and Practice in Bankruptcy as altered by the New Statutes, Orders, and Decisions, London, 2 vols.; 2nd edit. 1844. Montagu also published several series of bankruptcy reports: with John Macarthur, London, 1830, 1832; with Scrope Ayrton, 1834–9, 3 vols.; with Richard Bligh, 1835; with Edward Chitty, 1840; with Edward E. Deacon and John De Gex, 1842–5, 3 vols.

To the Retrospective Review Montagu contributed in 1821 two articles on the Novum Organum of Francis Bacon, whose Works he edited, in 16 vols., between 1825 and 1837. He attempted to rehabilitate Bacon's character as a man. Thomas Babington Macaulay criticised Montagu in a celebrated Essay on Bacon, originally published in the Edinburgh Review for July 1837. In 1841 Montagu began the publication of Letters to the Right Hon. T. B. Macaulay upon the Review of the Life of Lord Bacon; only the first, however, dealing with Bacon's conduct in Peacham's case, appeared. Montagu's edition was effectively superseded by James Spedding's work from 1860; he was assisted in it by Francis Wrangham and William Page Wood, who were responsible for the translations of the Latin treatises.

Montagu also published a volume of Essays, mainly reprints, with An Outline of a Course of Lectures upon the Conduct of the Understanding, London, 1824; Thoughts on Laughter, London, 1830; Thoughts of Divines and Philosophers, London, 1832, (a volume of selections); Lectures delivered at the Mechanics' Institution upon the connexion between Knowledge and Happiness, London, 1832; Essays and Selections, London, 1837; and Thoughts on the Conduct of the Understanding, a fragment of an intended major work that he had on hand for thirty years, printed for private circulation, probably in 1847.

Montagu published a long series of pamphlets denouncing the death penalty (1811–30), and two on the emancipation of the Jews (1833–34). Other works were:

- Enquiries and Observations respecting the University Library, Cambridge, 1805;
- Selections from the Works of Taylor, Hooker, Hall, and Lord Bacon, with an Analysis of the Advancement of Learning, London, 1805;
- An Examination of some Observations upon a passage in Dr. Paley's Moral Philosophy on the Punishment of Death, London, 1810;
- Some Enquiries into the Effects of Fermented Liquors, London, 1814;
- Some Thoughts upon Liberty, and the Rights of Englishmen, London, 1819;
- The Private Tutor, or Thoughts upon the Love of Excelling and the Love of Excellence, London, 1820;
- A Letter to the Right Hon. Charles, Lord Cottenham, Lord High Chancellor of Great Britain, on the Separation of the Judicial and Political Functions of the Lord Chancellor, London, 1836;
- Knowledge, Error, Prejudice, and Reform, London, 1836;
- Rules for the Construction of Statutes, Deeds, and Wills, London, 1836;
- Adam in Paradise, or a View of Man in his first State, London, 1837, a reprint of Robert South's sermon on Gen. i. 27;
- A Letter addressed to Charles Purton Cooper, Esq., Secretary to the Commissioners on the Public Records upon the Report of the recent Record Committee, London, 1837;
- The Law of Parliamentary Elections (with W. Johnson Neale), London, 1839;
- The Funerals of the Quakers, London, 1840;
- The Law and Practice upon Election Petitions before Committees of the House of Commons, London, 1840;
- Three Lectures on the Works of Lord Bacon (unknown date).

== Family ==
Montagu married three times:

1. On 4 September 1790, Caroline Matilda Want of Brampton, Huntingdonshire;
2. at Glasgow, in 1801, Laura, eldest daughter of Sir William Beaumaris Rush of Roydon, Suffolk, and Wimbledon, Surrey;
3. the widow of Thomas Skepper, lawyer, of York.

He had by his first wife a son Basil Caroline, mentioned in William Wordsworth's lines 'To my Sister' and 'Anecdote for Fathers'. By his second wife he had three sons; and two sons and a daughter by his third wife. All his children but two (his daughter and one of his sons by his third wife) died in his lifetime. His third wife, whose maiden name was Benson, was the daughter of a wine merchant of York, and in her youth had known Robert Burns (cf. his complimentary letter to her dated Dumfries, 21 March 1793, in his Correspondence). She in middle age fascinated Edward Irving, who gave her the sobriquet of "the noble lady".' Thomas Carlyle, introduced to her by Irving in 1824, corresponded with her; and during the earlier years of his residence in London was a frequent visitor at 25 Bedford Square. Carlyle was offended by an offer of a clerkship at £200 a year which Montagu made him in 1837. His early letters to her were printed for private circulation by her daughter by her first husband, Mrs Procter, soon after the publication of the 'Reminiscences' (see Bryan Waller Procter).

A portrait of Montagu by Opie was lent by Bryan Waller Procter ("Barry Cornwall") to the third Loan Exhibition (No. 183).
