= John Ashley Warre =

British Member of Parliament (1787–1860)

John Ashley Warre FRS (5 October 1787 – 18 November 1860) was a British Member of Parliament.

== Biography ==
He was born into a family of colonial merchants, the eldest son of John Henry Warre of Queen Square, Bloomsbury, Middlesex and Belmont Lodge, Hertfordshire and was educated at Harrow School (1796-1804) and Christ Church, Oxford (1804). He succeeded his father in 1801.

He secured the Parliamentary seat of Lostwithiel in 1812, sitting until 1818 and subsequently represented the constituencies of Taunton (1820–26), Hastings (1831–34) and Ripon (1857–60). He inherited a property in Folkestone from his uncle in 1824 and was appointed High Sheriff of Kent for 1848–49.

He was elected a Fellow of the Royal Society in May 1817. He was also a founder member of the Society for the Prevention of Cruelty to Animals and was among those who voted on the resolution to create the SPCA (later in 1840 becoming RSPCA) at the meeting held on 16 June 1824 at Old Slaughter's Coffee House, London which was chaired by Thomas Fowell Buxton MP (1786-1845).

He married three times: firstly Susanna, the daughter of John Cornwall of Hendon; secondly Florence Catherine (died 1837), daughter of Richard Magenis, MP; and thirdly Caroline Temple, daughter of Pascoe Grenfell of Taplow. He left three sons and a daughter.
