= Old Slaughter's Coffee House =

Bygone coffee house

- Interactive map of the Old Slaughter's Coffee House area
- Former names: Slaughter's Coffee House
- Alternative names: The Coffee-house on the Pavement

General information
- Status: Demolished
- Location: St Martin's Lane, 74–75
- Coordinates: 51.51160°N 0.12781°W
- Opened: 1692
- Demolished: 1843

Old Slaughter's Coffee House was a coffee house in St Martin's Lane in London. Opened in 1692 by Thomas Slaughter, it was the haunt of many of the important personages of the period. The building was demolished in 1843 when Cranbourn Street was constructed.

== History ==
It was opened in 1692 by Thomas Slaughter and so was first known as Slaughter's or The Coffee-house on the Pavement, as not all London streets were paved at that time. It was at numbers 74–75; however, around 1760, after the original landlord had died, a rival New Slaughter's opened at number 82, and the first establishment then became known as Old Slaughter's.

It was patronised by players of games that included chess, draughts and whist. Notable players included Abraham de Moivre, Benjamin Franklin and Philidor. It was also popular with artists of all kinds, including architects, painters, poets, and sculptors. This artistic community included Dryden, Gainsborough, Hogarth, and Roubiliac. Foreigners such as Frenchmen were often there, and Boswell reports Dr Johnson's comment on this around 1780:

His unjust contempt for foreigners was, indeed, extreme. One evening, at Old Slaughter's Coffee-house, when a number of them were talking loud about little matters, he said 'Does not this confirm old Meynell's observation, For any thing I see, foreigners are fools?'

— James Boswell, The Life of Samuel Johnson, LL. D.

Henry Fielding was a regular and nicknamed the head-waiter "Sock". Sock was said to be the out-of-wedlock son of a popular comedian, James Spiller, and had a similar talent for droll wit. On one occasion, he partook of a customer's punch while bringing it and excused this by saying that he had spilled it. Thereafter, Sock was also known as the "Punch Spiller".

It was used as a meeting house, and the Society for the Prevention of Cruelty to Animals, which subsequently became the RSPCA, was founded there in 1824. The meeting was organised by the Reverend Arthur Broome and chaired by Sir Fowell Buxton. There were eight other gentlemen attending, including "Humanity Dick" – aka Colonel Richard Martin – who had successfully campaigned for the Cruel Treatment of Cattle Act in 1822 but whose latest bill for the Prevention of Cruelty to Animals had been defeated in the Lords that day. Other MPs attending included Sir James Mackintosh and William Wilberforce.

The premises were demolished in the winter of 1843 when Cranbourn Street was constructed.

== See also ==
- English coffeehouses in the 17th and 18th centuries
