= William Mudford =

British writer, essayist, translator of literary works and journalist

William Mudford as depicted by Sir George Hayter in his painting The Trial of Queen Caroline.

William Mudford (8 January 1782 – 10 March 1848) was a British writer, essayist, translator of literary works and journalist. He also wrote critical and philosophical essays and reviews. His 1829 novel The Five Nights of St. Albans: A Romance of the Sixteenth Century received a good review from John Gibson Lockhart, an achievement which was considered a rare distinction. Mudford also published short fictional stories which were featured in periodicals such as Blackwood's Edinburgh Magazine, Fraser's Magazine, and Bentley's Miscellany.

His short story "The Iron Shroud", about an iron torture chamber which shrinks through mechanical action and eventually crushes the victim inside, was first published in August 1830 by Blackwood's Edinburgh Magazine, and later republished separately in 1839 and 1840 with the subtitle "Italian Revenge". Edgar Allan Poe is considered to have been influenced by "The Iron Shroud" when he wrote "The Pit and the Pendulum" having got his idea for the shrinking chamber from Mudford's story. Mudford was born in London, where his father made a living as a shopkeeper in Piccadilly. He was influenced by John Milton, Joseph Addison, Samuel Johnson, William Cowper, William Collins, Mark Akenside, Thomas Gray, and Oliver Goldsmith.

== Life and work ==
Mudford was born in Half Moon Street, Piccadilly, London, on 8 January 1782. He exhibited an interest in political philosophy and attended lectures at the university of Edinburgh where he befriended John Black who, at the time, was also a student at the university. Later, Mudford published a series of letters exchanged with Black in William Cobbett's Political Register. The letters centred around a debate about classical education. In the exchanges, Mudford had argued against the merits of classical education, while Black supported the opposite side. In 1810 Mudford published a series of essays under the title The Contemplatist, which were originally published in instalments in a weekly periodical under the same title. He later joined the Morning Chronicle as a parliamentary reporter. Departing from the Chronicle he was employed first as assistant editor, and then as the editor of the Courier which at the time was an influential evening journal on par with the Times. After he came to a disagreement with the owners of the Courier over policy matters, Mudform resigned from the journal and issued a letter justifying his actions. His letter drew a lot of attention at the time. In the aftermath of his departure the Courier lost readership and eventually closed while attempts at inviting Mudford back at the journal proved unsuccessful.

Mudford has been described by Sir Walter Scott as an author who "loves to play at cherry-pit with Satan."; a Shakespearean expression used to indicate familiarity with the Devil. John H. Collins, analysing the influence of Mudford's work, comments that "the Shroud story is a first rate piece of writing comparable to the best half-dozen works by Poe" and that "it should not just be dismissed as a mere potboiler which the genius of Poe transformed." He goes on to mention that he thinks many readers mistakenly think that the "Iron Shroud" is one of Poe's works thus further strengthening Poe's reputation by attributing to him a story that he actually plagiarised. In the Dictionary of Literary Biography Mudford's writing is described as vigorous while as a writer he is called a master at creating atmosphere. In the same source, his stories are analysed as lacking the subtlety and psychological depth found in the writings of Edgar Allan Poe but they are described as amusing and entertaining.

In 1803 Mudford published his first novel, Augustus and Mary also known as The Maid of Buttermere: A Domestic Tale. Following that, Mudford made a living occupied by more mundane work such as translating foreign works and editing essays and other literary works. He also wrote his second novel Nubilia in Search of a Husband which was his response to the popular Coelebs in Search of a Wife by Hannah More and was clearly aimed at capitalising on the market success of the novel by More.

As a young man Mudford showed his ambition by contacting influential and powerful men. When only seventeen, Mudford approached the producer of the Covent Garden Theatre John Philip Kemble, with the suggestion of issuing a pamphlet in his honour. Years later this was followed by a proposal for a theatrical play which was rejected by Kemble. The play itself was subsequently lost. Mudford, at 18, followed the Duke of Kent to Gibraltar as his assistant secretary. Mudford was a Tory and a supporter of the foreign minister of the era George Canning. Mudford was also a close friend and supporter of Samuel Taylor.

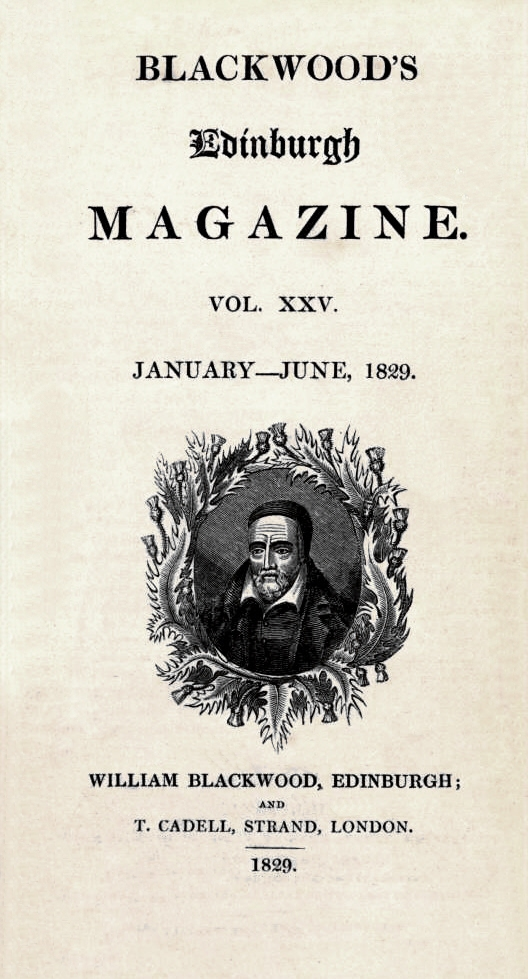
Mudford was a frequent contributor to Blackwood's Edinburgh Magazine

At the age of forty he lost a lot of money in speculative ventures in the stock market and had to start again financially. He worked very hard and accepted an offer from the conservative party in East Kent to become the editor of the Kentish Observer. He finally settled in Canterbury and eventually became the owner of the Kentish Observer. He contributed regularly to Blackwood's Magazine and sometimes he wrote a story, a review, and a political paper in the same issue. His series of First and Last stories were very popular as were his contributions under the nickname of The Silent Member. In 1841 Mudford moved back to London where he succeeded Theodore Hook as editor of the John Bull magazine all the while maintaining his connection with the Kentish Observer. During this period his health started declining but he still kept a busy work schedule. In 1848 he wrote his last article on the topic of the French Revolution which appeared in the John Bull on 5 March of the same year.

Mudford, while employed at the Morning Chronicle, met William Hazlitt who was also working as a journalist there. A rivalry developed between the two and Hazlitt became one of Mudford's detractors. In Hazlitt's essay in Table-Talk published in 1821 under the title Coffee-House Politicians, Roger Kirkpatrick, one of Hazlitt's friends, is described as a Mudford impersonator. In the essay Mudford was described by Hazlitt as a Contemplative Man who wrote an answer to Coelebs. Hazlitt then goes on to describe him as a man made of fleecy hosiery and fat, pert, and dull as it was possible to be. Hazlitt thought that Mudford was a political hack-type journalist and a government tool and he often criticised and ridiculed him.

Charles Dickens used a parody of Mudford's name when he wrote the Mudfog Sketches, creating the town of Mudfog as a parody of Chatham. Mudford was also a founder member of the Society for the Prevention of Cruelty to Animals and was among those who voted to create the organisation on 16 June 1824 at Old Slaughter's Coffee House, London.

Mudford died at 5 Harrington Square, Hampstead Road, on 10 March 1848, leaving a widow and eight children. His second son, William Heseltine Mudford, became the editor of the Standard in 1894. In Mudford's obituary, appearing in the June 1848 issue of Gentleman's Magazine, his abilities as the editor of the Courier were praised. The entry on Mudford for the Oxford Dictionary of National Biography appeared in 2004, written by David Finkelstein.

== Selected works ==
- A Critical Examination of the Writings of Richard Cumberland, Sherwood Pub., Neely, and Jones, 1812
- A critical enquiry (1802), Garland Pub., 1974
- The life of Richard Cumberland, esq., Sherwood, Neely and Jones Pub., 1812
- A critical enquiry into the writings of Samuel Johnson in which it is shewn that the pictures of life contained in the Rambler, and other publications of that celebrated writer have a dangerous tendency. M. Jones, 1803
- Sudario de Hierro y Otros Cuentos Goticos by James Hogg, John Howison, William Mudford, Celeste Pub., July 1999 Paperback
- The Iron Shroud, Viking Press, June 1973 Hardcover
- The Five Nights of St. Albans, James Blackwood & Co Pub., June 1929 Textbook Binding
- Nubilia in search of a husband, printed for J. Ridgeway, Piccadilly; and Sherwood, Neely, and Jones, 1809
- Nubilia in search of a husband, Bradford & Inskeep, T. & G. Palmer Pub., 1809 [microform]
- An historical account of the campaign in the Netherlands in 1815, under His Grace the Duke of Wellington, and Marshal Prince Blücher, printed for Henry Colburn, 1817
- The Contemplatist: a series of essays upon morals and literature Sherwood Pub., 1810, 336 p.
- Stephen Dugard, a novel, London: Richard Bentley, 3 volumes, 1840.
