= List of animal sanctuaries =

This is a list of notable animal sanctuaries from around the world. This list contains only sanctuaries who have their own articles within Wikipedia, or a section within an article in Wikipedia.

== Argentina ==
- Santuario Equidad, San Marcos Sierras, Córdoba Province

== Australia ==
- Save A Cow Foundation Cow Sanctuaries, Queensland, Australia.
- Warrawong Sanctuary, Adelaide

== Bolivia ==
- Parque Ambue Ari, Santa Cruz Department Run with help from volunteers by Comunidad Inti Wara Yassi.
- Parque Jacj Cuisi, La Paz Department Run with help from volunteers by Comunidad Inti Wara Yassi.
- Parque Machía, Villa Tunari Run with help from volunteers by Comunidad Inti Wara Yassi.

== Canada ==
- The Donkey Sanctuary of Canada, Guelph, Ontario
- Fauna Foundation, a chimpanzee sanctuary, Chambly, Quebec
- North Mountain Animal Sanctuary, Burlington, Nova Scotia. Sanctuary for abused, neglected, and unwanted farm animals.
- RAPS Cat Sanctuary, Richmond, British Columbia

== Chile ==
- Santuario Igualdad Interespecie, Santiago de Chile

== Germany ==
- Wohlfühlhof Zeh, Waltenhofen, Bavaria

== India ==
See: Wildlife sanctuaries of India- For Example:

- Bhadra Wildlife Sanctuary
- Bandhavgarh National Park
- Bandipur National Park
- Bhindawas Wildlife Sanctuary
- Chinnar Wildlife Sanctuary, Idukki district, Kerala state
- Dandeli Wildlife Sanctuary, Uttara Kannada District, Karnataka state
- Dudhwa National Park, Lakhimpur Kheri District, Uttar Pradesh
- Gir National Park and Sasan Gir Sanctuary, Talala Gir, Gujarat
- The Great Himalayan National Park, Kullu region, Himachal Pradesh
- Hemis National Park
- Jim Corbett National Park
- Kanha National Park
- Kaziranga National Park
- Keoladeo Ghana National Park
- Manas National Park
- Nagarhole National Park
- Panna National Park
- Pench National Park
- Periyar National Park
- Rajaji National Park
- Ranthambore National Park, Sawai Madhopur district, Rajasthan
- Sadhana Forest
- Sariska National Park
- Silent Valley National Park
- Sundarbans National Park
- Tadoba Andhari Tiger Reserve

== Italy ==
- Italian Horse Protection Association (IHP), Montaione

== Kenya ==
- African Fund for Endangered Wildlife Kenya limited (AFEW (K) LTD) also known as the Giraffe Centre
- Amboseli Trust for Elephants
- David Sheldrick Wildlife Trust
- Ol Pejeta Conservancy
- Tsavo East National Park
- Tsavo West National Park

== Malaysia ==
- Kota Kinabalu Wetland Centre, Kota Kinabalu

== New Zealand ==
- Maungatautari Restoration Project
- Orokonui Ecosanctuary
- Pukaha / Mount Bruce National Wildlife Centre
- Shakespear Open Sanctuary
- Bird Sanctuary
- Willowbank Wildlife Reserve
- Zealandia

== Pakistan ==
- Ayubia National Park
- Deosai National Park
- Haleji Lake
- Hingol National Park
- Kirthar National Park
- Khunjerab National Park
- Lal Suhanra National Park
- Machiara National Park
- Margalla Hills National Park
- Rann of Kutch Wildlife Sanctuary

== South Africa ==
- Kruger National Park

== Thailand ==
- Elephant Nature Park, Chiang Mai Province

== United Arab Emirates ==
- Sir Bani Yas
- Ras Al Khor

== Uganda ==
- Ziwa Rhino Sanctuary – Located approximately 176 kilometres (109 mi), by road, north of Kampala, on the Kampala-Gulu Highway

== United Kingdom ==
=== England ===
- Barby Keel Animal Sanctuary, Bexhill-on-Sea, East Sussex
- Buttercups Sanctuary for Goats, Maidstone, Kent.
- Cornish Seal Sanctuary, Gweek, Cornwall
- Ferne Animal Sanctuary, Somerset, Wambrook, near Chard, originally run by Nina Douglas-Hamilton, Duchess of Hamilton
- Hillside Animal Sanctuary, Frettenham, Norwich
- Lower Moss Wood Educational Nature Reserve and Wildlife Hospital, Knutsford, Cheshire
- Monkey World, Wool, Dorset
- Mousehole Wild Bird Hospital and Sanctuary, Mousehole, Cornwall
- Natureland Seal Sanctuary, Skegness
- Raystede animal rescue and sanctuary, Lewes, East Sussex
- Redwings Horse Sanctuary, Norwich, Norfolk
- Swan Sanctuary, Shepperton
- The Donkey Sanctuary, Sidmouth, Devon
- The Horse Trust, Speen, Buckinghamshire
- The Monkey Sanctuary, Looe, Cornwall
- Thornberry Animal Sanctuary, Rotherham, South Yorkshire

=== Northern Ireland ===
- Assisi Animal Sanctuary, Conlig, Northern Ireland

=== Scotland ===
- Willows Animal Sanctuary, Fraserburgh, Scotland

=== Wales ===
- Wales Ape and Monkey Sanctuary, Abercrave, Wales

== United States ==
=== California ===
- Animal Place, Grass Valley
- Farm Sanctuary, with locations in Acton (Animal Acres) and Orland
- The Gentle Barn, Santa Clarita

=== Colorado ===
- Mission: Wolf, Westcliffe
- The Wild Animal Sanctuary, Keenesburg

=== Florida ===
- Big Cat Rescue, Tampa
- Forest Animal Rescue by Peace River Refuge & Ranch, Silver Springs
- Save the Chimps, Fort Pierce
- Critter Creek Farm Sanctuary, Gainesville

=== Georgia ===
- Noah's Ark Animal Sanctuary, Locust Grove
- Farm of the Free, Good Hope
- Outsider's Farm and Sanctuary, Bowersville

=== Hawaii ===
- Leilani Farm Sanctuary, Haiku

=== Indiana ===
- Black Pine Animal Sanctuary, Albion

=== Kentucky ===
- Primate Rescue Center

=== Louisiana ===
- Chimp Haven, Keithville

=== Missouri ===
- The Gentle Barn, Dittmer

=== Montana ===
- Yellowstone Wildlife Sanctuary, Red Lodge, Montana

=== New Jersey ===
- Popcorn Park Animal Refuge, Lacey
- The Raptor Trust, Millington
- Tamerlaine Sanctuary and Preserve, Montague, New Jersey
- Skylands Sanctuary & Animal Rescue, Wantage, New Jersey

=== New York ===
- Farm Sanctuary, Watkins Glen
- Woodstock Farm Animal Sanctuary, High Falls
- Arthur's Acres Animal Sanctuary, Parksville

=== North Carolina ===
- Carolina Tiger Rescue, Pittsboro
- Goathouse Refuge, Pittsboro

=== Oregon ===
- Blue Barn Farm and Sanctuary, Creswell
- Chimps Inc., Bend
- Welcome Home Animal Sanctuary, Creswell

=== Rhode Island ===
- Norman Bird Sanctuary, Middletown

=== Tennessee ===
- The Elephant Sanctuary, Hohenwald
- The Gentle Barn, Christiana
- Tiger Haven, Roane County
- Old Friends Senior Dog Sanctuary, Mount Juliet, Tennessee

=== Texas ===
- Bat World Sanctuary, Palo Pinto County
- Primarily Primates, Bexar County
- Tiger Creek Animal Sanctuary, Tyler

=== Utah ===
- Best Friends Animal Society, Angel Canyon, near Kanab

=== Vermont ===
- Merrymac Farm Sanctuary , Charlotte, near Burlington

=== Virginia ===
- Sentient Sanctuary, Scottsville, Virginia

== Zimbabwe ==
- Hwange National Park
