= Timeline of Dushanbe =

The following is a timeline of the history of the city of Dushanbe, Tajikistan.

== 20th century ==
- 1923 - Town of Dushanbe established in the Emirate of Bukhara.
- 1925 - Town becomes capital of the Tajik Autonomous Soviet Socialist Republic.
- 1929
  - Town renamed "Stalinabad."
  - Railroad begins operating.
- 1934 - Tajikistan National Museum established.
- 1935 - Ura-tepe-Stalinabad road opens.
- 1946 - Pamir Stadium opens.
- 1950 - CSKA Pomir Dushanbe football club formed.
- 1951 - Academy of Sciences of Tajik SSR established.
- 1955 - Trolleybuses begin operating.
- 1960 - Zoo opens.
- 1961 - City named "Dushanbe" again.
- 1964 - Dushanbe Airport in operation.
- 1965 - Population: 312,000.
- 1975 - Palace of Unity and Hotel Tajikistan built.
- 1979 - Population: 510,000.
- 1981 - Saodat Teahouse built.
- 1984 - Goskino Cinema and Concert Hall built.
- 1985 - Population: 552,000 (estimate).
- 1987 - Sister city relationship active with Boulder, Colorado, USA.
- 1990

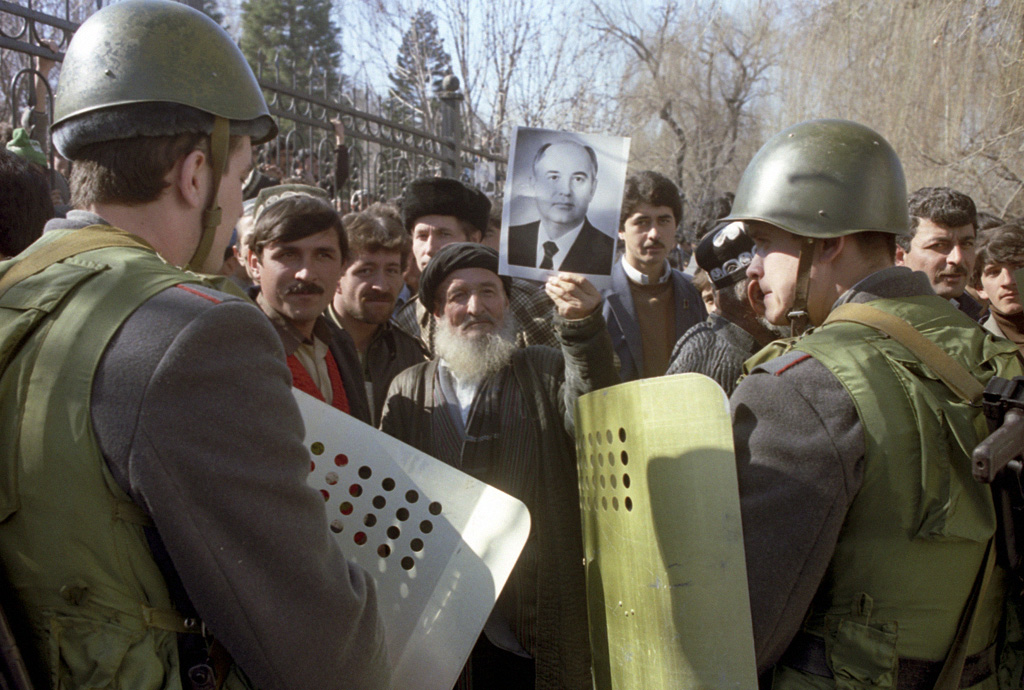
Dushanbe riots, February 1990

  - 12–14 February: Dushanbe riots.
  - Gurminj Museum of Musical Instruments established.
- 1992 - Demonstrations against government.
- 1996
  - Mahmadsaid Ubaydulloyev becomes mayor.
  - Dynamo Dushanbe football club formed.
  - Russian-Tajik Slavonic University established.
- 1997 - Presidential Palace stormed.

== 21st century ==
- 2002 - Curfew lifted.
- 2003
  - Academy of Maqâm founded.
  - 2003 Central Asian Games held.
- 2005 - January: Car explosion.
- 2007
  - 14 November: Bombing at Palace of Unity.
  - Istiqlol Dushanbe football club formed.
  - Population: 670,168.
- 2009 - New Dushanbe Synagogue opens.
- 2011 - Dushanbe Flagpole erected.
- 2012 - 5 September: Fire in Karvon market, and subsequent protest.
- 2017 - Population: 823,787 (estimate).

== See also ==
- Dushanbe history (ru, uk)
- Other names of Dushanbe
- History of Tajikistan

== Bibliography ==
- Magnus Marsden (2012), Caroline Humphrey (ed.), "For Badakhshan-the Country without Borders: Village Cosmopolitans, Urban-Rural Networks and the Post-Cosmopolitan City in Tajikistan", Post-Cosmopolitan Cities, New York: Berghahn Books
