= Wohlfühlhof Zeh =

Farm animal sanctuary in Bavaria, Germany

Coordinates: 47.626°N 10.228°E

- Formation: 2014; 12 years ago
- Founders: Hans-Peter Zeh
- Registration no.: 200961
- Legal status: e.V.
- Purpose: Animal protection
- Location: Waltenhofen, Bavaria
- Region served: Allgäu
- Services: Vacation rental
- Website: wohlfuehlhof-zeh.de

Wohlfühlhof Zeh is a farm animal sanctuary in Waltenhofen, Germany. It was originally a dairy farm. The sanctuary's founder Hans-Peter Zeh had inherited the farm in the third generation. In 2014, he converted it to a sanctuary and kept his remaining cows to let them live out their natural lifespans. As of 2022, the sanctuary houses 23 cows, 27 chickens, eight cats, seven goats, and four ducks. It derives income from renting out holiday apartments on its premises, and from donations.

== See also ==
- List of animal sanctuaries
- 73 Cows, a documentary about an English beef farm that stopped using its cows and gave most of them to a sanctuary.
