= Hillside Animal Sanctuary =

Animal sanctuary

Coordinates: 52°42′15″N 01°19′49″E

Hillside Animal Sanctuary logo

Hillside Animal Sanctuary, based in Frettenham, Norwich, and with a site at West Runton, North Norfolk, is the United Kingdom's largest home for different kinds of farm animals and horses. The vegan-run sanctuary is funded entirely on public donations. The sanctuary was established by Wendy Valentine and its patron is actor Martin Shaw.

== Formation ==
Valentine formed the sanctuary in 1995 after she witnessed the farming of battery hens, and has since helped and campaigned for and on behalf of animals. She is quoted as saying Hillside's aim is to:

Help and campaign for animals in need and to bring public awareness to the millions of animals suffering every day in the intensive factory farming industry.

== Evolution ==
When the Norfolk Shire Horse Centre at West Runton came up for sale in 2007, Hillside Animal Sanctuary stepped in and purchased the site. Shire horses are still homed at West Runton, but also other rescued animals may be visited here too. Between the two sites, 1,200 rescued horses, 300 cows, 600 sheep & goats and 150 pigs are spread out over 1,000 acres. Hillside has also helped re-home animals on the closure of a number of other animal sanctuaries, notably the Quality of Life Animal Sanctuary (QoLAS) in Devon in 2011, Rainbow Ark Sanctuary in 2014, Green Meadows Sanctuary in 2015, Blossoms Sanctuary in 2016, and Derwent Valley Donkey Sanctuary in 2019. The sanctuary was further enlarged by the purchase of Church Farm, Haveringland, occupying part of the site of the former RAF Swannington, in 2017.

== Today ==
Hillside is now home to over 2000 rescued animals including horses, donkeys, cattle, goats, alpacas, sheep, ducks and chickens. and claims to be "one of the UK's most successful campaigning organisations for the animals' cause." In June 2017, a herd of 59 cows, formerly intended as beef cattle, was rehomed to Hillside after its vegetarian owner concluded he could no longer justify farming animals.

== Undercover investigations ==
Hillside has an animal cruelty investigation unit that acts directly on tip-offs from members of the public. The unit provides video evidence that often leads to prosecution in cases of animal cruelty. They have carried out many undercover operations to highlight cases of alleged animal abuse within the British farming industry.

Some of the more well known cases include in 2006, involvement in the successful prosecution of two employees of Bernard Matthews Beck Farm in Felthorpe, near Norwich, who both admitted ill treatment of animals after they were secretly filmed by a member of the Hillside unit beating turkeys with metal poles held like baseball bats. The case was brought to court by the RSPCA and the two men were found guilty. The court's sentence was 200 hours community service. Later the same year another investigation by Hillside, at Cherrydene Farm in Bergh Apton, Norfolk (which produces for MFD Foods Ltd.) uncovered animal cruelty. The farm was a member of the animal welfare charity RSPCA-owned 'Freedom Food label'. The 'Freedom Food' stamp of approval informs consumers that any meat carrying its logo is from a farm where animals are kept in the best possible conditions. The footage showed animals kept in squalid conditions and ducks being punched, picked up by the neck and kicked. The farm has since been sold and closed down. In 2012, Hillside investigated Red Lion Horse slaughterhouse, Nantwich, and the footage was used by the Guardian whose reporters were able to trace a number of consignments of horse to Dutch distributors who were then being investigated as part of the 2013 horse meat scandal.

=== Television ===
Hillside the animal sanctuary and also Hillside's separate work in uncovering animal cruelty have both featured in television programmes, including Channel 4's It's Me or the Dog, BBC Three's The Baby Borrowers and the BBC Two programme Escape to the Country which had an episode dedicated to Hillside. ITV's Tonight with Trevor McDonald featured Hillside's investigation footage and the RSPCA defending their Freedom Food Scheme. The BBC's Inside Out was based on Hillside's investigative footage 'Pigs in Purgatory', also on another episode of Channel 4's Dispatches 'What's Really in Your Christmas Dinner?' which won PETA UK's Best Animal-Friendly Television Programme for 2006 saying: "Especially eye-opening was video footage from inside the factory farms where turkeys and pigs are intensively reared." In Channel 4's Dispatches programme 'Supermarket Secrets', journalist Jane Moore looked at the cost consumers and animals are paying for cheap, homogenised, convenient supermarket food. Undercover video footage taken inside a chicken broiler house and an examination of the lives of dairy cows revealed the poor conditions for animals used for meat and milk. In 2011, a Sky News report about duck farming featured undercover Hillside footage.

== Wendy Valentine ==
Valentine is a vegan and the founder of Hillside Animal Sanctuary (1995) and the Redwings Horse Sanctuary in Norfolk (1984). In 2005 she was cautioned by police over a protest she staged in Norwich city centre. She scattered six dead turkeys just days before Christmas to highlight the conditions they were kept in. Valentine is an outspoken animal rights advocate. She said that while Britain has some of the best animal protection laws in the world, they are rarely enforced or upheld. She stated: "The farms are protected, not the animals.”

In 2001, Valentine, along with a colleague were fined for trespassing on to a pig farm in north Norfolk to gather evidence of cruelty and the poor living conditions. They were fined nearly £5,000 after they pleaded guilty to entering an infected place, namely Woodlands Farm, without written permit during a swine fever outbreak. District Judge Patrick Heley described the way in which Valentine and her accomplice gathered their evidence as "improper, illegal, intrusive and irresponsible", he also dismissed their video evidence.

== See also ==
- 73 Cows
- List of animal sanctuaries
