= Caehopkin =

Village in Powys, Wales

Coordinates: 51.79°N 03.71°W

Caehopkin: Welsh: Cae Hopcyn
- Location within Powys
- OS grid reference: SN8212
- Principal area: Powys
- Country: Wales
- Sovereign state: United Kingdom
- Police: Dyfed-Powys
- Fire: Mid and West Wales
- Ambulance: Welsh

Caehopkin (Welsh: Cae Hopcyn) is a village in Powys, Wales. It lies between Abercraf and Coelbren in the Swansea Valley on the border of the Brecon Beacons National Park.

Previously it was a mining community, however many of the mines in the area closed in the 1960s such as Abercrave Colliery and Ynyscedwyn Colliery. Now only the Nant Helen opencast coal site remains in the area. The Wales Ape and Monkey Sanctuary lies just outside the village near Abercraf.

It is in the community of Tawe-Uchaf.
