= Wales Ape and Monkey Sanctuary =

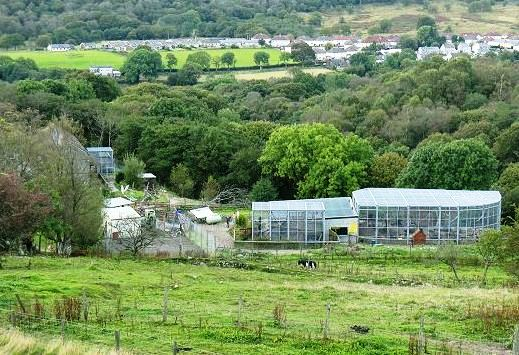
- The chimpanzee cages at the Wales Ape and Monkey Sanctuary
- Interactive map of Wales Ape and Monkey Sanctuary
- 51.79677°N 3.69051°W
- Date opened: December 2008; 17 years ago
- Location: Caehopkin; Abercraf; Wales
- Website: Wales Ape and Monkey Sanctuary

Wales Ape and Monkey Sanctuary is an animal sanctuary between Caehopkin and Abercraf in Powys, Wales. It became the Wales Ape & Monkey Sanctuary in December 2008, being previously known as Cefn-yr-Erw Primate Sanctuary. The sanctuary is owned and operated by husband and wife Graham and Jan Garen.

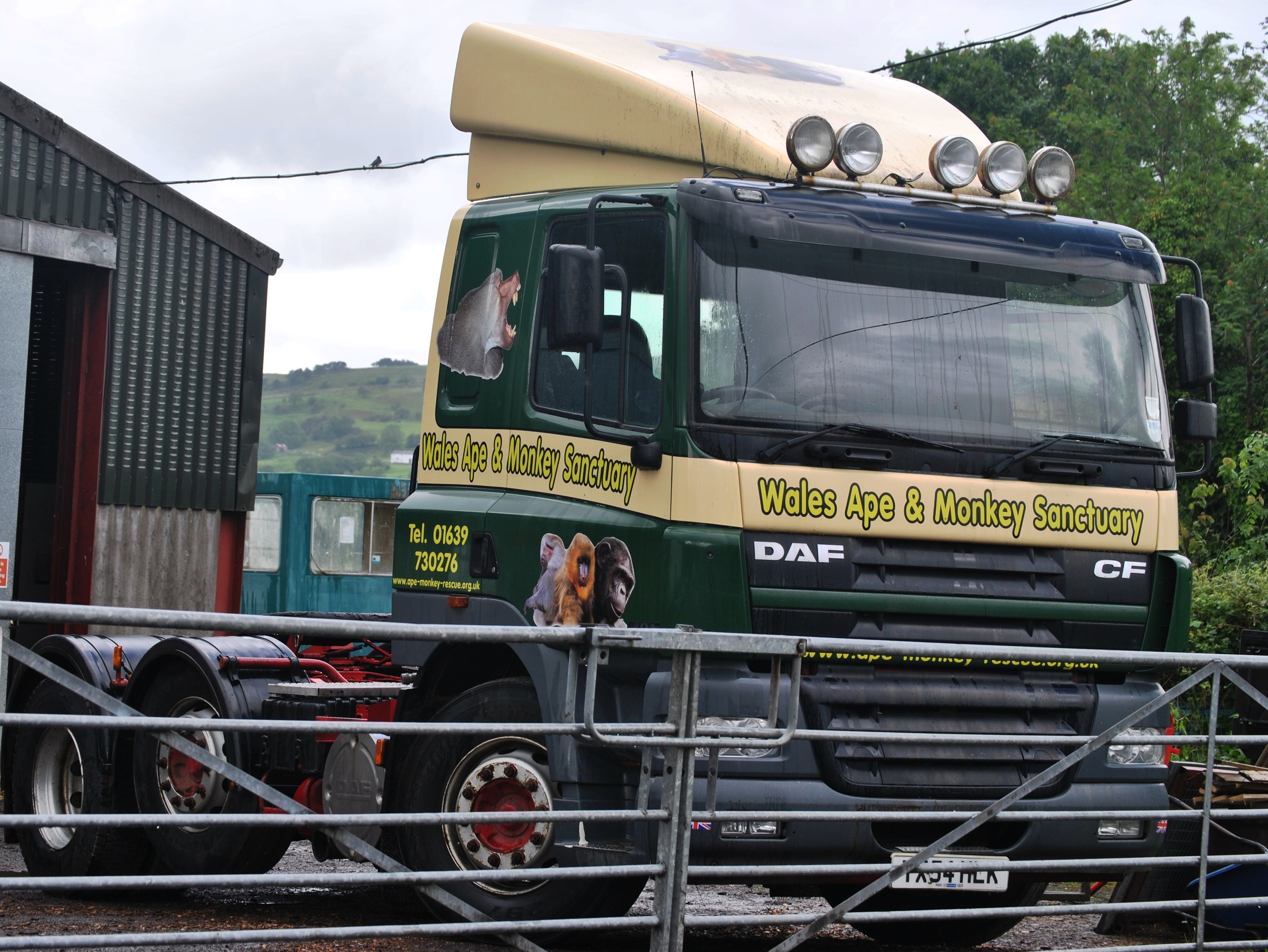
Wales Ape and Monkey Sanctuary transportation truck

Cefn-yr-Erw had been a traditional hill farm, when Jan inherited it from her father. Jan first acquired a Vietnamese Potbelly Pig and later some marmosets, goats, capybaras and several traditional farm animals. Jan married Graham Garen in 1994 and the sanctuary continued to develop. When Penscynor Wildlife Park closed in 1998, the sanctuary took seven unwanted chimpanzees from the park and were able to house them from 21 February 1999 within the sanctuary. They would have been shot without the intervention of the sanctuary. The sanctuary now provides a final home for many types of unwanted primates (in particular chimpanzees, baboons, spider monkeys, capuchins and marmosets) and non-primates ("African savannah cats, meerkats, wolf dogs, horses, donkeys, pigs and others").

As the animals that they rescue are not able to survive in the wild, they try to make the rest of the animals' lives as enjoyable as possible. The sanctuary has a policy of not breeding any animals.

The sanctuary receives no funding from the UK government, Welsh governments or local councils and therefore relies donations from the public and also from the entrance fee to its 30,000 visitors a year. It is a registered charity (Charity ID:1076645).

== See also ==
- List of animal sanctuaries
