= Frettenham Windmill =

Windmill in Frettenham, Norfolk, England

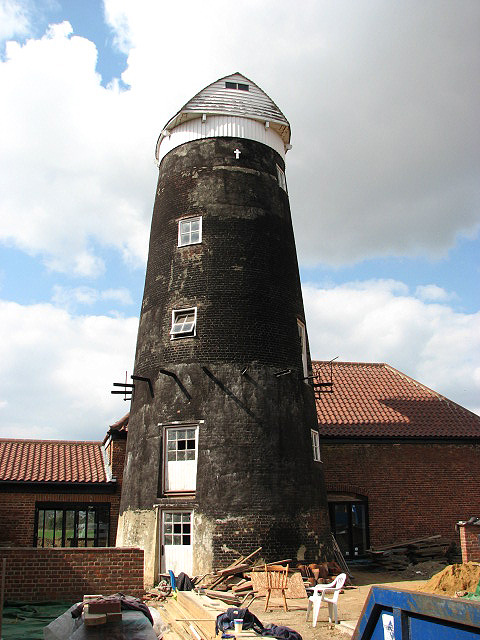
- The mill under conversion
- Interactive map of Frettenham Windmill

Origin
- Mill name: Frettenham Mill
- Mill location: TG 24591 776
- Coordinates: 52°42′39.28″N 1°19′24.37″E
- Operator: Private
- Year built: c.1880

Information
- Purpose: Corn
- Type: Tower mill
- Storeys: Five storeys
- No. of sails: Four sails
- Winding: Fantail
- No. of pairs of millstones: Two pairs
- Size of millstones: One pair 4 feet 4 inches (1.32 m)

Frettenham Mill is a Grade II listed tower mill at Frettenham, Norfolk, England which has been converted to residential accommodation.

== History ==
Frettenham Mill was built c1880 for Joshua Harper. He died in 1891 and the mill was offered for sale by auction at the Royal Hotel, Norwich on 18 July 1891. It was bought by Alfred Herne, who worked it until c.1900.

The mill had lost its sails and fantail by c.1910. The mill was derelict by 1937, but at that time retained the cap frame. By 2004, the mill and associated outbuildings had been converted to residential accommodation. A new boat shaped cap was fitted to the mill tower.

Graham Cottrell and wife Suzanne Cottrell owned the mill between 2011 and 2016, during that time the fourth mill stone (two still in place, one incorporated into the village sign) was returned to the site and mounted as a water feature in the garden, additionally a modern single door on the first floor was replaced with a pair of doors matching the oldest photos of the mill that are available.

== Description ==
Frettenham Mill is a five storey tower mill which had a stage at second floor level. The cap was winded by a fantail. The mill had four sails. The tower is 47 feet (14.33 m) to the curb. Much of the machinery survives in the converted mill, including the wooden upright shaft, wooden clasp-arm great spur wheel, cast iron crown wheel with wooden teeth and two pairs of underdrift French Burr millstones. One of the millstones was incorporated into the village sign.

== Millers ==
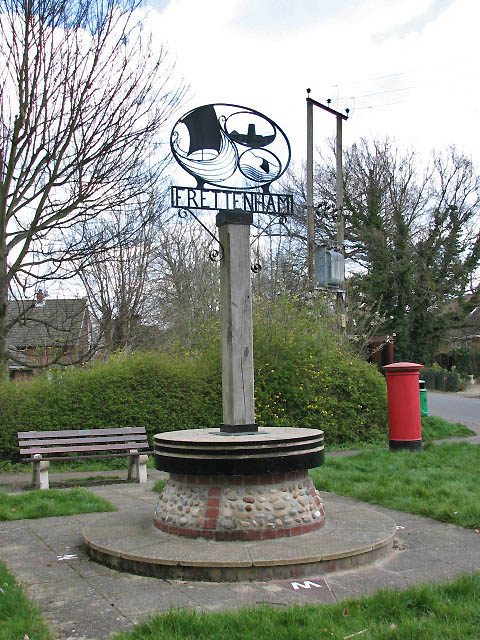
The village sign, incorporating a millstone from Frettenham Mill

The mill was operated by miller Joshua Harper from 1880-91, before the role passed to Alfred Edward Sutton Herne in 1891, who held the position until the year 1900.
