= Dushanbe Zoo =

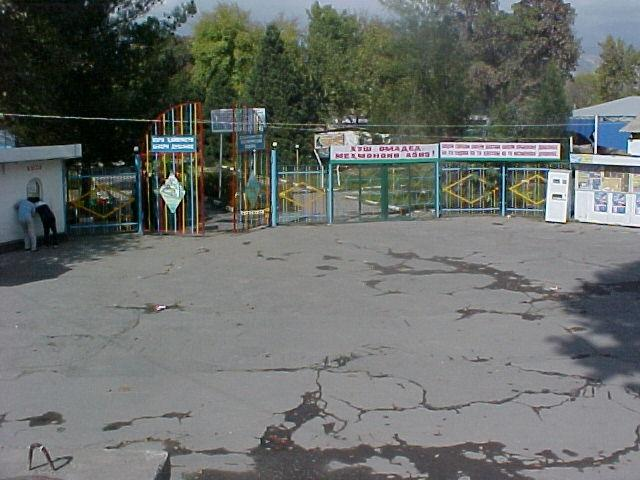
- Main Entrance
- Interactive map of Dushanbe Zoo
- 38°35′06″N 68°46′19″E
- Date opened: 1960
- Location: Dushanbe, Tajikistan
- No. of animals: 600

Dushanbe Zoo or Dushanbe Zoological Park (Russian: Душанбинский зоопарк, romanized: Dushanbinskiy zoopark; Tajik: Боғи Ҳайвоноти Душанбе, romanized: Boği Hayvonoti Dushanbe) was founded in 1960 in Dushanbe, Tajikistan. The zoo is located in the center of the city on the Luchob river bank (on Ismoili Somoni Avenue), next to the Pamir Stadium, and measures roughly twice the size of the stadium.

== History ==
Dushanbe Zoo was founded in 1960. By 1974, with 1059 animals of 254 species, Dushanbe Zoo was regarded as one of the best zoos in the Soviet Union. The relatively mild climatic conditions of Dushanbe allowed tropical fauna to be kept outdoors. Until the breakdown of the Soviet Union and independence in 1991, the zoo was considered one of the best sightseeing attractions in Dushanbe. The number of animals was great and diverse. The two Indian elephants, Delhi and Radsch, were favorites of visitors.

National independence in 1991, followed by a civil war lasting until 1997, posed a great threat to the zoo in terms of the loss of species and economic hardship; public financing was no longer available to the extent it was before. Staff and volunteers faced a challenge to their own survival. In short, the once-famous zoo was abandoned and left to survive on its own. However, because it is the only public institution to present to the population species of local and foreign fauna, zoo attendance is now being restored.

In 2019 more than 25 animals died. The terrarium burned down with all the creatures within burnt alive.

An article from 2024 alleged that there was not enough money provided from the state budget to feed the animals or to build a more modern, comfortable zoo despite proposals being made several years ago. The proposal made in 2018 was for a new zoo to be set up on the site of the Korvon market, by 2020 the preferred location had become the banks of the Varzob River in the northern outskirts.

== Fauna ==
Today, the number of animals kept is about 600. Dushanbe Zoo is the only institution in the country that supports wildlife in captivity. Animals of both indigenous and foreign species of Asian and African fauna are kept here. Of the exotic animals, some African and Asian primates are kept here. Of the large cat family there is a male and female lions, a jaguar and snow leopard. Of local fauna, brown bear, black bear, Bactrian camel, donkey, wolf, jackal, fox, raccoon, and some birds like owl, vulture, golden eagle, and falcon are presented here. Also some reptiles, like snakes, caimans, lizards are displayed indoors. None of the animals enjoy their natural habitat and are kept in cages that are inappropriate for their sizes. The conditions are very harsh for the animals, especially as specialized care is not available.

== Connection with Black Pine Animal Sanctuary, Albion, Indiana, United States ==
In 2006, an accident at Dushanbe Zoo led to a student's arm being mauled by a bear. Student pen-pals at schools in Dushanbe and Albion, Indiana brainstormed ways to increase safety at the zoo, and to improve the zoo in general. Working with mentors and sponsoring organizations, the work of the two groups of students resulted in the zoo receiving a $75,000 grant in 2007 from the American Alliance of Museums, which will allow the zoo to develop a volunteer program, repair fences, add signs, and put in a garden area, picnic area, and playground.
