= Critter Creek Farm Sanctuary =

American animal sanctuary

- Formation: 2016; 10 years ago
- Founders: Erin Amerman; Chris Amerman
- Tax ID no.: 83-2914563
- Legal status: 501(c)(3) organization
- Location: Gainesville, Florida, United States
- Website: crittercreekfarmsanctuary.org

Critter Creek Farm Sanctuary (CCFS) is an American animal sanctuary and animal welfare organization located in Gainesville, Florida. It is America's largest shelter for farmed bovines, with 98 cows as of October 2020. The sanctuary was founded by Erin Amerman and her husband Chris Amerman in 2016. Critter Creek Farm Sanctuary's mission is to promote compassion for farmed animals through rescue and education.

== History ==
Critter Creek Farm Sanctuary was founded on a 200-acre property in 2016 in Gainesville, Florida. The original Critter Creek property comprises a 125-acre wildlife preserve and a 75-acre sanctuary. In 2019, the Amermans expanded the sanctuary with the purchase of "Critter Hills", a 205-acre former cattle ranch. Amerman, an author of human anatomy and physiology textbooks, cites a lifelong love of animals as inspiring her to start a sanctuary.

== The sanctuary ==
Critter Creek Farm Sanctuary has two facilities totaling 415 acres. As of October 2020, it is home to 98 cows, 19 pigs, 11 horses, nine donkeys, three turkeys, and a water buffalo. The animals housed at the sanctuary were injured, neglected, abused, or at imminent risk of slaughter.

Education is a key part of the sanctuary's mission. In pursuit of that mission, it hosts open houses, tours, and vegan farmers markets to facilitate interaction with the animals. According to Amerman, the aim of these events is to help people see farmed animals in a different light.

Notable sanctuary residents include Seymour the water buffalo, Eli the calf, and Marley the piglet. The duo of Eli and Marley were transported together to the sanctuary; during the trip, they formed a friendship. This friendship was featured in an episode of Comeback Kids by The Dodo. The story of Eli and Marley was ranked as number six in the top 10 animal stories of 2020 by the website One Green Planet. In April 2021, Buddy the Beefalo, an animal who escaped a slaughterhouse in Connecticut, was captured by Plymouth police captain Ed Benecchi and transported to Critter Creek Farm Sanctuary.

== Rescue collaborations ==
Critter Creek Farm Sanctuary frequently collaborates with other rescue organizations, including the SPCA and The Humane Society. In April 2020, it partnered with Farm Sanctuary, the Animal Legal Defense Fund, and five Florida sanctuaries to rescue over 100 animals from an illegal slaughterhouse in Fort Myers, Florida. Also in April 2020, Critter Creek Farm Sanctuary rented a truck and delivered donated produce to rescue organizations harmed financially by the COVID-19 pandemic.

== See also ==
- List of animal sanctuaries
- Animal welfare
- Animal rights
- The Humane Society of the United States
