= Spindles Farm =

Former farm in Buckinghamshire, England

Spindles Farm was a farm in Hyde Heath, near Amersham, Buckinghamshire, England, run by horse dealer James Gray (also known as Jamie Gray). It was the location of a significant animal cruelty case in 2008 where dozens of horses were neglected, some being left to starve to death. The incident was described as "the worst case ever experienced by the RSPCA" by the judge at the resulting court trial.

== Animal cruelty discovery ==
Inspectors from the RSPCA visited the farm on Friday 4 January 2008 to discover more than 125 horses, ponies and donkeys in a state of neglect at the farm, with a further 32 dead equines also found amongst those that were still alive.

A large scale rescue operation was mounted by the RSPCA along with World Horse Welfare and Redwings Horse Sanctuary and took eight days to complete, due to the number of horses involved and their condition. On 12 and 13 January 2008, 115 equines were removed from the property, with others having to be put down on site.

After seeing the conditions in the fields, it wasn't until I went into the yard that the enormity of it hit me. There were dead horses on the ground in front of me, and to the right. I looked across there was a dead horse in the stalls. It was like walking into another world. There were none of the normal noises I associate with a stable yard - horses moving about, eating, drinking, calling out to one another or the gentle noises that horses make when approached, expecting to be fed or cared for. They were totally silent. Even the horses that appeared in better bodily condition seemed to be depressed, almost as if they had lost their dignity.

— Nick White, World Horse Welfare

For two days on 12 & 13 January 2008, a nine-year-old girl called Katy Roberts who has hemiplegia held a silent protest outside the gates of Spindles Farm in protest at the cruelty that had, at that time, been alleged to have taken place there, and later protested outside the hearing at Aylesbury Magistrates court and set up a website detailing events.

== Court action ==
In June 2009, the owner of the farm, horse trader James John Gray (Jamie Gray) was sentenced to six months imprisonment, fined £400,000 and banned from keeping horses for life, the maximum penalty available to the court for the nine cases of causing unnecessary suffering to animals and two charges of failing to protect animals from pain, injury, suffering and disease.

James Gray's son, James Junior, was also convicted on identical charges to his father, although with a sentence of an 18-month supervision order and a ten-year ban on keeping horses. His wife, Julie, and 2 young daughters Jodie and Cordelia were also found guilty of two counts of failing to protect the animals, all being sentenced to 10-year bans on keeping horses and community service.

The family appealed against their sentences in May 2010, but James Gray, his wife and daughters all had their convictions upheld. James Junior was acquitted of two offences, but was found guilty of all the remaining offences.

James Gray absconded court while awaiting sentencing on 12 May 2010 and went on the run, with a warrant issued for his arrest. He was arrested 2 weeks later on 26 May, during a random spot check by police between junctions 4a and 5 on the M5 near Bromsgrove, Worcestershire.

== See also ==
- Animal welfare in the United Kingdom
