= The Gentle Barn =

US non-profit organization

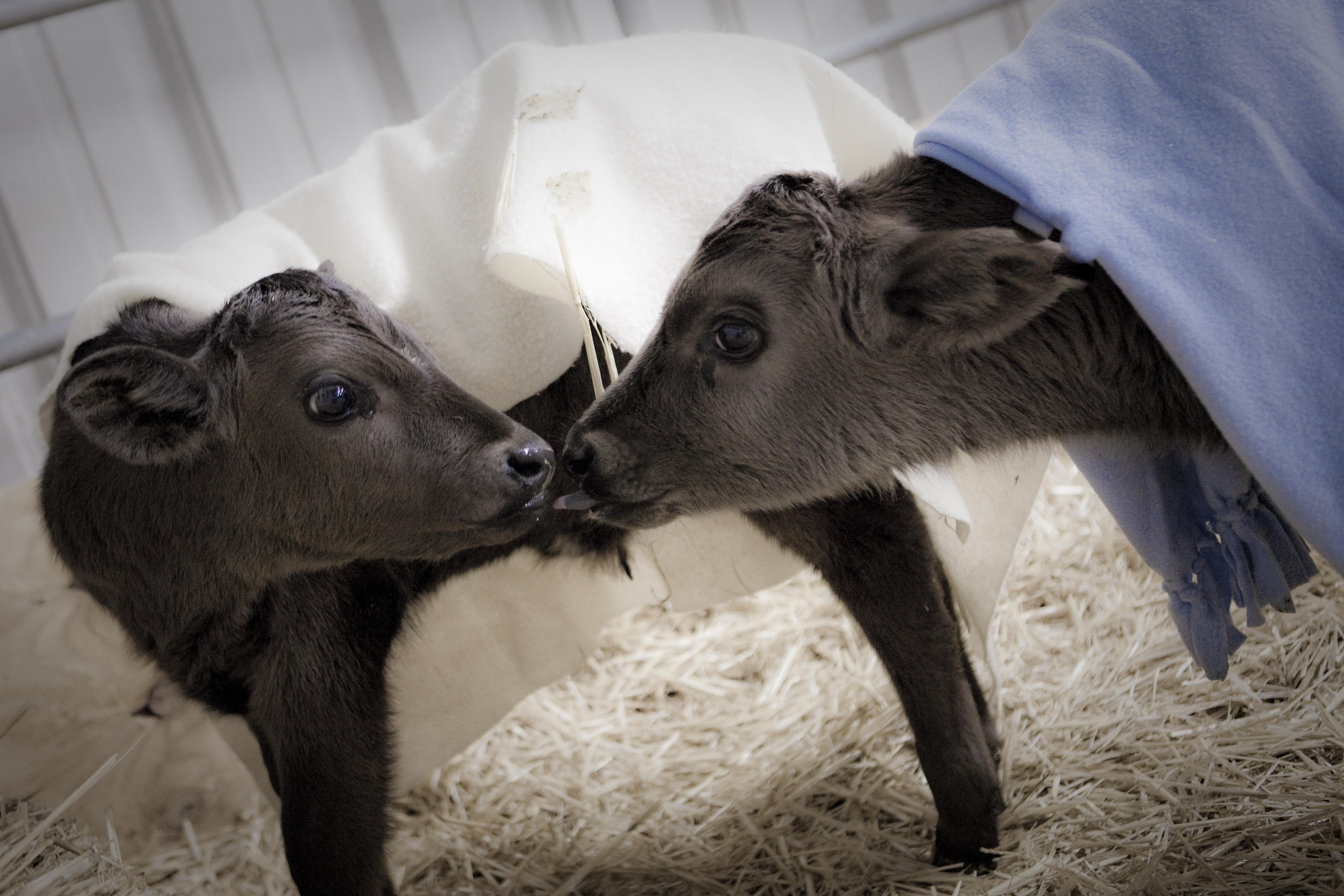
- Rescued livestock calves at the Santa Clarita, California location
- Founded: 1999
- Founder: Ellie Laks
- Purpose: Animal welfare, animal rights
- Locations: Santa Clarita, California; Christiana, Tennessee
- Key people: Jay Weiner
- Volunteers: 900
- Website: www.gentlebarn.org

The Gentle Barn is an American nonprofit 501(c)(3) animal sanctuary organization located in Santa Clarita, California and Christiana, Tennessee, with a former location in Dittmer, Missouri. Founded by Ellie Laks in 1999, The Gentle Barn's mission is to provide sanctuary for abused animals who would not otherwise be able to find homes.

== History ==
The Gentle Barn was founded in 1999 on a half-acre property in Tarzana, California. Jay Weiner, who is also Laks' husband, joined the organization in 2002. In 2003, the organization moved to a six-acre property at its current location in Santa Clarita. Laks cites a childhood love for animals as the inspiration for creating the sanctuary. She also credits animals with helping her heal after an abusive childhood.

The organization began allowing visitors the same year it opened, and later added animal-assisted therapy programs for disabled and special-needs children and at-risk youth, including inner-city gang members, drug addicts, and abused children.

In 2012, The Gentle Barn took in 51 animals from the property of Roberto Celedon, a "backyard butcher" who was charged on 13 counts, including three felonies related to cruelty to animals. For its work in the case, The Gentle Barn was honored by Supervisor Michael D. Antonovich of the Fifth District of Los Angeles County.

In 2015, a second Gentle Barn was opened in Knoxville, Tennessee, but relocated to Christiana, Tennessee, in 2018. In 2017, a third Gentle Barn was opened in Dittmer, Missouri, though it closed in 2024, with its animals set to be rehoused into the California and Tennessee locations. The Gentle Barn hopes to eventually open a location in every state in America.

== The sanctuary ==
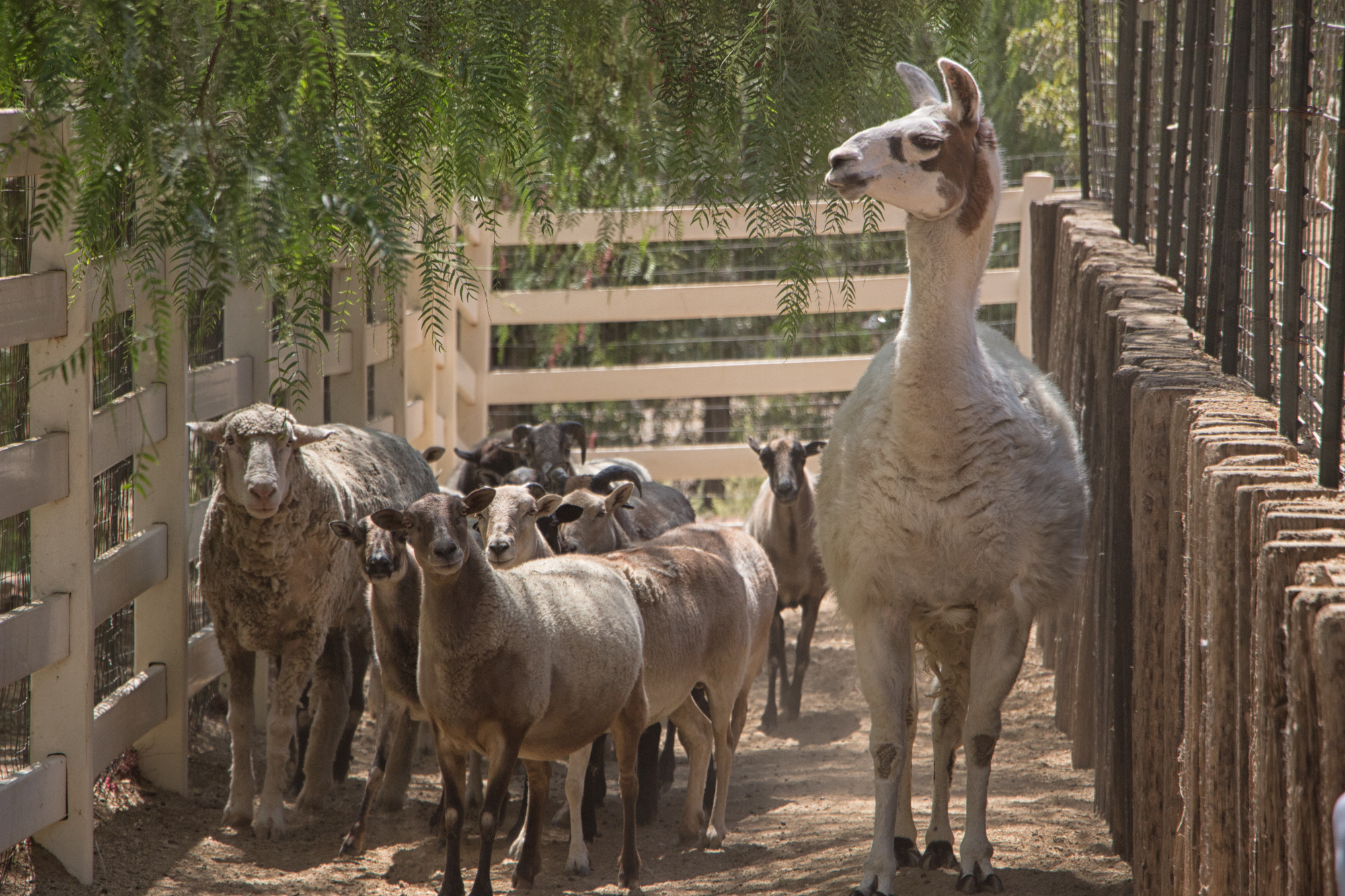
Sheep and a llama at The Gentle Barn, Santa Clarita

The current six-acre property in Santa Clarita, California has horsed and cow pastures, a barnyard for the smaller animals, and an organic vegetable garden. It currently houses 170 animals, including cows, horses, pigs, sheep, chickens, llamas, emus, cats, dogs, and birds. The first cow rescued, Buddha, is often used for therapy sessions with quadriplegic children. Animals at The Gentle Barn are treated with a holistic approach, including acupuncture and veterinary chiropractic methods. The property is completely vegan and does not allow any food products derived from animals. The property is open for tours on Sundays. A separate facility, the Sun Chlorella Healing Center, is not open to the public and is used to treat the sickest and most traumatized animals. The Gentle Barn requires $50,000 a month to operate. Most of the funds come through the website, from individual donors, corporate grants, and foundations. Major donors include Ellen DeGeneres, Portia de Rossi, Hilary Swank, Kirstie Alley, Toyota, CBS, William Morris Endeavor, and Princess Cruises. Actress and animal activist Pamela Anderson has also visited The Gentle Barn to feed turkeys on Thanksgiving. In 2011, a lock of hair given by Justin Bieber to Ellen DeGeneres was auctioned for over $40,000, with all proceeds going to The Gentle Barn.

== Cow Hug Therapy ==
The Gentle Barn saves animals who are in dire situations such as cows who are about to be sent to the slaughter house. The owner of the Gentle Barn would bring the animals to the sanctuary and after healing and bonding with the animals she would cuddle with them. She found that hugging and snuggling up with the cows helped relieve stress so she started providing a cow cuddle therapy program at her sanctuaries. Now, visitors can pay for time to snuggle up with the animals to relieve their own stress and anxiety.

== See also ==
- Animal-assisted therapy
- Animal welfare
- Animal rights
- Cruelty to animals
- Overpopulation (animals)
