= Frettenham =

Village in Norfolk, England

Coordinates: 52.7087°N 1.3239°E

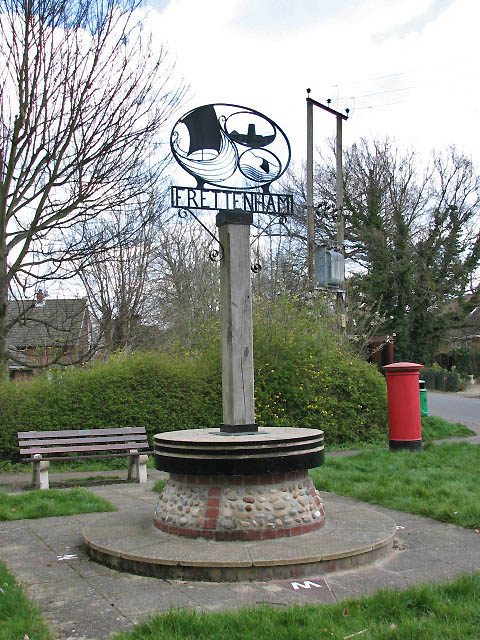
- Frettenham village sign, incorporating a millstone from Frettenham Mill

- Location within Norfolk
- Area: 2.44 sq mi (6.3 km^{2})
- Population: 844 (2021 census)
  - Density: 346/sq mi (134/km^{2})
- OS grid reference: TG246174
  - London: 103 miles (166 km)
- Civil parish: Frettenham
- District: Broadland
- Shire county: Norfolk
- Region: East
- Country: England
- Sovereign state: United Kingdom
- Post town: Norwich
- Postcode district: NR12
- Dialling code: 01603
- Police: Norfolk
- Fire: Norfolk
- Ambulance: East of England
- UK Parliament: Broadland and Fakenham

Frettenham is a village and civil parish in the English county of Norfolk.

Frettenham is located 3.2 miles (5.1 km) west of Wroxham, and 5.7 miles (9.2 km) north of Norwich.

== History ==
Frettenham's name is of Anglo-Saxon origin and derives from the Old English for Fraeta's homestead or village.

In the Domesday Book, Frettenham is listed as a settlement of 34 households hundred of Taverham. In 1086, the village was part of the East Anglian estates of Roger the Poitevin.

Frettenham Windmill dates from the late-Nineteenth Century and is currently a private residence with its sails and fantail removed. The windmill is a Grade II listed building.

During the First World War, a Royal Flying Corps airfield was built in the parish though it soon returned to agricultural use.

== Geography ==
According to the 2021 census, Frettenham has a population of 844 people which shows an increase from the 740 people recorded in the 2011 census.

Hillside Animal Sanctuary is located within the parish.

== St. Swithin's Church ==
Frettenham's parish church is dedicated to Saint Swithin and dates from the Fourteenth Century. St. Swithin's is located outside of the village on Church Lane and has been Grade II listed since 1961. Since the COVID-19 pandemic, the church has not been open for Sunday worship.

St. Swithin's was restored in the Victorian era by Richard Phipson and holds a monumental brass memorial to Alice Thorndon (d.1420) with further stone memorials to Rev. Richard Woodes (d.1620) and Thomas Drake (d.1810) who was a treasurer aboard HMS Centaur and later a prisoner of Hyder Ali and Tipu Sultan.

== Governance ==
Frettenham is part of the electoral ward of Buxton for local elections and is part of the district of Broadland.

The village's national constituency is Broadland and Fakenham which has been represented by the Conservative Party's Jerome Mayhew MP since 2019.

== War memorial ==
Frettenham's war memorial takes the form of a stone obelisk above a trapezoid plinth and is located in St. Swithun's Cemetery. The memorial was unveiled in January 1921 by John Cator, High Sheriff of Norfolk and John Willink, Dean of Norwich and lists the following names for the First World War:

Rank	Name	Unit	Date of death	Burial/Commemoration
Sgt.	Thomas C. Buck DCM	2nd Bn., Coldstream Guards	9 May 1915	Rue-des-Berceaux Cem.
LCpl.	Louis P. Money	1/7th Bn., Lancashire Fusiliers	25 Mar. 1918	Arras Memorial
LCpl.	Albert Rivett MM	9th Bn., Norfolk Regiment	15 Apr. 1918	Tyne Cot
Dvr.	Walter J. Forster	27th Bde., Royal Field Artillery	29 Sep. 1918	Lebucquière Cemetery
Gnr.	Frederick J. Stoladay	46th Bde., R.F.A.	11 Dec. 1918	Niederzwehren Cemetery
Pte.	Charles A. Buck	1st Bn., Essex Regiment	17 Apr. 1917	Duisans Cemetery
Pte.	Cecil F. Muskett	1st Bn., Norfolk Regiment	9 Oct. 1917	Hooge Crater Cemetery
Pte.	Frederick H. Bloom	7th Bn., Norfolk Regt.	17 Jul. 1915	Pont-de-Nieppe Cemetery
Pte.	William F. Norgate	1/5th Bn., Northumberland Fusiliers	26 Oct. 1917	Tyne Cot
Rfn.	Robert C. Garrett	9th (Victoria's Rf) Bn., London Regt.	22 Nov. 1917	Cambrai Memorial

The following names were added after the Second World War:

Rank	Name	Unit	Date of death	Burial/Commemoration
Pte.	Sydney G. Wymer	1/4th Bn., Essex Regiment	5 Oct. 1944	Coriano Ridge Cemetery
Pte.	Cecil G. Cannell	6th Bn., Royal Norfolk Regiment	29 Nov. 1943	Chungkai War Cemetery
