= Buddy the Beefalo =

American beefalo (2017/2018–2025)

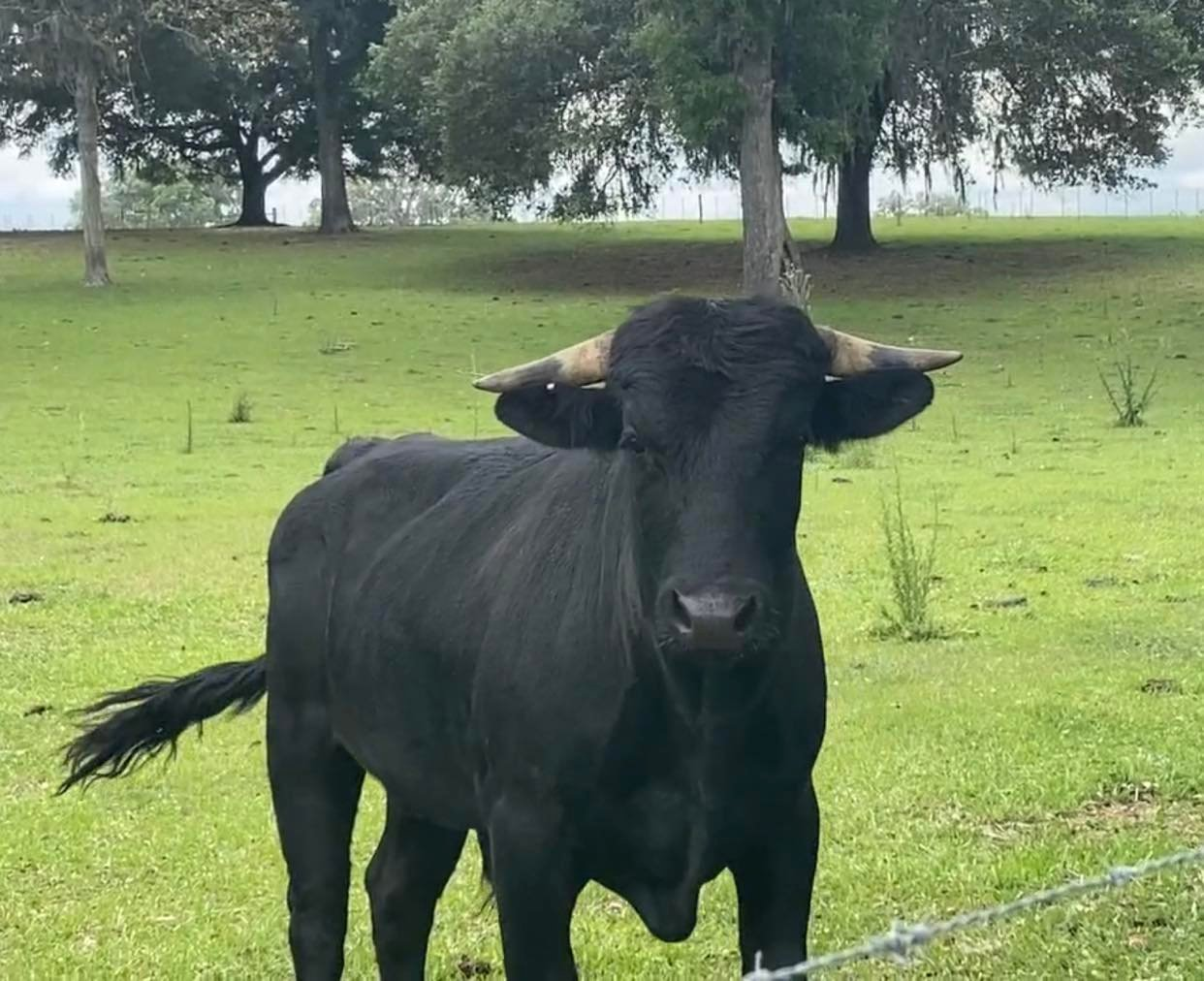
- Buddy in 2022
- Species: Beefalo (hybrid of a cow and bison)
- Sex: Male
- Born: 2017 or 2018
- Died: December 2025 (aged 7)
- Nationality: United States
- Known for: Escaping a slaughterhouse
- Residence: Critter Creek Farm Sanctuary, Florida

Buddy the Beefalo (2017 or 2018 – December 2025) was an American beefalo (a hybrid of a cow and a bison) who became notable for his August 2020 escape from a slaughterhouse in Connecticut. Buddy evaded all attempts at capture for eight months, until the Plymouth Police Department successfully captured Buddy in April 2021. After his capture, Buddy was transported to Massachusetts for a medical evaluation before traveling to Critter Creek Farm Sanctuary in Florida.

== Escape and attempts at capture ==
Buddy first gained attention by escaping from a slaughterhouse near Plymouth, Connecticut, in August 2020. Amidst the ongoing COVID-19 pandemic in the United States, Buddy's escape and the numerous attempts to capture him became a media sensation. Plymouth Police Department captain Edward Benecchi led the effort to recapture Buddy, out of concern for his welfare and the danger of the black beefalo being hit by drivers at night. After spending a number of nights looking for and observing the beefalo, Benecchi created a trap using a local apple orchard Buddy frequented as a lure. Several attempts at capture were defeated by Buddy's highly cautious nature.

== Capture and relocation to sanctuary ==
An opportunity for capturing Buddy presented itself when he broke a fence to join a group of cattle at a pasture in the area. Although the Plymouth police responded once his break-in was reported, Buddy escaped from the pasture before he could be captured. Buddy was once again spotted at the pasture several weeks later, and the pasture's owner worked with a veterinarian to finally capture him after 254 days on the run.

The Plymouth Police Union started a crowdfunding campaign to pay Buddy's "bail" (buying him from his previous owner, a farm) and raised over $8,500 to do so. The police department arranged for Buddy to be transported to Florida. Upon arrival at Critter Creek Farm Sanctuary in April 2021, Buddy reportedly adapted to life there quickly. He broke a fence shortly after his arrival not in an escape attempt but to break out of quarantine and be with the other cattle at the sanctuary.

Buddy the Beefalo died in December 2025 at the age of 7.

== In popular culture ==
Buddy the Beefalo Escapes!, a children's book written by military romance suspense novelist Marliss Melton and illustrated by her niece Stephanie Melton, was published in 2025. Profits from the book were directed to the Critter Creek Farm Sanctuary.
