= Thornberry Animal Sanctuary =

Animal charity in South Yorkshire, England

Thornberry Animal Sanctuary is one of the largest animal rescues and welfare charities in South Yorkshire. Located in Sheffield, South Yorkshire, England. It is an animal sanctuary and shelter, providing temporary shelter, care, rehabilition and work to rehome animals into loving homes whilst adhering to a non-destruction policy.

== Information ==
Thornberry was founded in 1988 by Steve Bamford, who sold his home to buy the land on which the sanctuary stands; turning his childhood hobby of rescuing and caring for animals into his life's work. Bamford lived in a small caravan for 5 years, without electricity, heating, running water or sanitation whilst the sanctuary was established. The main sanctuary site in North Anston initially took up 2 acres (8,100 m^{2}), containing kennels, cattery, stables, and barn. The stables later moved to Birks Farm in Worksop, but that facility was sold again, and the stables are now at Silverthorpe Farm in Ravenfield.

Bamford won the 2004 IFAW/The People Animal Action Award for Commitment. But he is no longer formally affiliated with the charity, having left following allegations of financial mismanagement in connection with the Birks Farm sale and Silverthorpe Farm purchase. The organisation itself, however, was cleared of any serious misconduct by the Charity Commission.

Thornberry Animal Sanctuary is now overseen by a General Manager and supported by a Board of volunteer Trustees. The charity is not funded by the government and is financed by donations and fundraising events. The sanctuary has a small number of paid staff to help with the welfare of the animals; it is otherwise mainly run by volunteers.

The sanctuary's charity shops and café are open for visitors every day.

Thornberry Animal Sanctuary operates four charity shops across South Yorkshire.

== See also ==
- List of animal sanctuaries

== Notes ==
- Appeal over dumped pets, BBC News, 5 January 2004
- They're Grreight: Meet the winners of our top Animal Action Awards, The People, 22 August 2004
- Pet charity is cleared of wrongdoing, The Star (Sheffield), 29 April 2006
- Animal charity gets the all-clear, BBC News, 2 May 2006
- Walkers take the lead to raise funds for animal sanctuary, The Star (Sheffield), 3 July 2006
- The rise and fall of horse-mad Steve Bamford, Dinnington Guardian, 26 November 2007
