= Mousehole Wild Bird Hospital and Sanctuary =

Bird sanctuary and hospital in Cornwall, England

- Location within Southwest Cornwall

General information
- Location: Mousehole, Cornwall, England
- Coordinates: 50°5′2″N 5°32′17″W

Mousehole Wild Bird Hospital and Sanctuary is a bird sanctuary and hospital based near Mousehole, a village in west Cornwall, England, United Kingdom.

The Hospital accepts both land and sea birds in need of care, to heal and return them to the wild. If this is not possible and they take kindly to captivity, then they are given sanctuary for the remainder of their lives. Those beyond help are painlessly destroyed.

During each year approximately 1000 birds are treated at the Hospital, and about 80 permanent residents. The staff care for the birds 365 days a year in the same tradition as the founders.

The hospital was founded in 1928 by Dorothy and Phyllis Yglesias. Over the years the Sanctuary has become famous, especially so during the 1967 Torrey Canyon disaster, when over 8,000 oiled birds passed through the Hospital.

In 2022, an outbreak of bird flu resulted in the hospital being closed and all of the birds under the hospital's care being culled.

== See also ==
- List of animal sanctuaries
