= Abercraf =

Village in Powys, Wales

Coordinates: 51°48′02″N 3°42′47″W

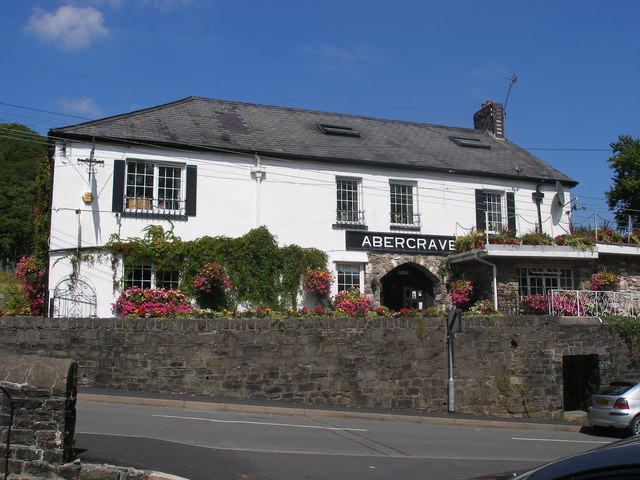
Abercrave Inn

Abercraf (also Abercrâf; or Abercrave) is a village in Powys, Wales, in the community of Ystradgynlais and within the historic boundaries of the county of Brecknockshire.

A distinct dialect of English is spoken in the village, as well as the Welsh language.

Between 1965 and 1991, the village was the location of a Royal Observer Corps monitoring bunker, to be used in the event of a nuclear attack. It remains mostly intact.

== Etymology ==
The name Abercraf denotes the area as the place where the Crâf stream flows into the Tawe. While most etymologies state that the river is simply named for the Welsh word craf (wild garlic), Thomas Morgan defines "cra-af" as "the issuing forth, the channel torn by the impulsive force of the stream, as well as the act of tearing or breaking up any substance" linking its meaning to the words crafu (to scratch) and crafangu (to claw or grip).

== Location ==
Abercraf lies in the extreme south of the county, in the Upper Swansea Valley 2.5 miles (4 km) northeast of the small town of Ystradgynlais. It is situated just outside the boundaries of the Brecon Beacons National Park and the Fforest Fawr Geopark, which lie to the immediate north, east, and west of the village.

== Coal and iron ==
A small ironworks was established in 1824 by the local coalowner, Thomas Harper. Its purpose was to exploit two patents granted to Harper and his fellow coalowner, John Christie (also owner of the Brecon Forest Tramroad) in 1823 (no 4848) and 1824 (no 4909) for the use of the local anthracite coal in smelting. The British Iron Company bought the works in 1825 for £19,541 and at the same time leased minerals on the nearby mountain, Cribarth. The venture soon proved unsuccessful and the furnaces were blown out in 1826 after it was discovered that production costs greatly exceeded the selling price. Coal continued to be worked from the taking; it was still in production in 1841 when the local agent gave a statement to the Children's Employment Commission.

The coal pits in nearby Caehopkin ceased production in the 1960s, although the Nant Helen open cast coal mine, owned by Celtic Energy, continued to operate until November 2023. The site has been landscaped and is now occupied by the Global Centre for Rail Excellence (GCRE), a rail Research & Development centre.

== Amenities ==
Abercraf has a number of public houses, a rugby union club (Abercrave RFC), junior/primary school, fire station and a Miners' Welfare Hall, a testament to the village's coal mining past. The Wales Ape and Monkey Sanctuary lies just outside the village.

Abercraf lies beneath the slopes of the miniature mountain of Cribarth, famous for its 'Sleeping Giant' outline, clearly visible from the nearby A4067 Swansea to Brecon road. The Giant is formed from a combination of the natural topography of the mountain and, in the case of the Giant's face, alterations to this topography from disused limestone quarries. The Giant's nose is surmounted by a trig point.
