= Peace River Refuge and Ranch =

Wildlife sanctuary in Florida, United States

Peace River Refuge & Ranch
- Peace River Refuge & Ranch, Inc.
- Nickname: Forest Animal Rescue
- Formation: 1998; 28 years ago
- Type: Nonprofit
- Tax ID no.: 65-0864695
- Legal status: 501(c)(3)
- Headquarters: Silver Springs, Florida

Forest Animal Rescue by Peace River Refuge and Ranch is an American nonprofit wildlife sanctuary in Florida.

== Overview ==
Forest Animal Rescue was founded in 1998. This animal sanctuary has been located in Silver Springs, Marion County, Florida, since 2013.

In 2024, it retired its captive exotics program to narrow its focus to native wildlife and expand those programs to help meet the growing needs of displaced wildlife in Florida. The facility protects, restores and maintains over 160 acres (650,000 m^{2}) of local habitat for wildlife to provide protected release sites for rehabilitated native wildlife that cannot be returned to where they came from. This facility offers educational advancement, natural wilderness awareness and coordinates with wildlife authorities to rehabilitate black bear cubs.

The wildlife refuge is a 501(c)(3) nonprofit organization.
