= Santuario Equidad =

Animal sanctuary

Santuario Equidad ('Equity Sanctuary') is an animal sanctuary principally for horses created by the Fondation Franz Weber (FFW) in San Marcos Sierra, Córdoba Province, in the centre of Argentina.

It is closely associated with the campaign «Basta de TaS» (Basta, 'enough', and TaS being Tracción a Sangre, 'driven to blood'), which aims to replace horses used for refuse collection with motorised vehicles and put an end to the mistreatment of horses throughout Latin America. However, the sanctuary also takes in other species.

The sanctuary was set up to allow freed animals to live peaceful, dignified and healthy lives.
