= Mission: Wolf =

Wolf sanctuary near Westcliffe, Colorado

- Mission: Wolf logo

- Katimik, a former inhabitant (Now deceased)
- Interactive map of Mission: Wolf
- 37.9632489°N 105.2148628°W
- Date opened: 1986
- Location: Westcliffe, Colorado, United States
- Website: www.missionwolf.org

Mission: Wolf (abbreviated M:W) is a remote wolf sanctuary near Westcliffe, Colorado in the Sangre de Cristo Mountains. It houses up to 40 wolves and wolf-dog crosses, and works to promote a better understanding of wolves in order to further reintroduction efforts and discourage attempts to keep wolves as pets.

== Founding ==
Mission: Wolf was founded by Idaho-born Kent Weber and his wife, Tracy Ane Brooks, as a remote shelter for a dozen purebred timber wolves and wolf-dogs. In the first year of constructing a house, they took in several wolf puppies. As word got out, the site began to attract visitors, who helped expand the site, allowing for the adoption of more wolves. At the peak of Mission: Wolf's adoption frenzy, they had 52 wolves and wolf-dogs, before realizing that there were far more animals than they would be able take in. The number of animals at the sanctuary at any one time is variable.

== Mission ==
Mission: Wolf's core goal is to educate the public about wolves and to clear their reputation as 'The Big Bad Wolf' through experiential education and respect for animals. They also advocate against the breeding of wolf-dogs and owning either wolves or wolf-dogs as pets.

Mission: Wolf accepts volunteers on both a short (2 weeks - 1 mo) and long term (1–3 months) basis. Many of the core administrative staff are volunteers as well.

== Sustainability ==
Mission: Wolf also has an emphasis on sustainability and respect for the environment. All the buildings at Mission: Wolf were built by volunteers and with donated or recycled building materials. Mission: Wolf is almost completely self-sufficient, using donations to pay for what they need, solar power for electricity on sunny days, and a propane generator when it is needed. They accept donations of livestock from ranchers, as well as hunting scraps and roadkill.

== Meeting the Wolves ==
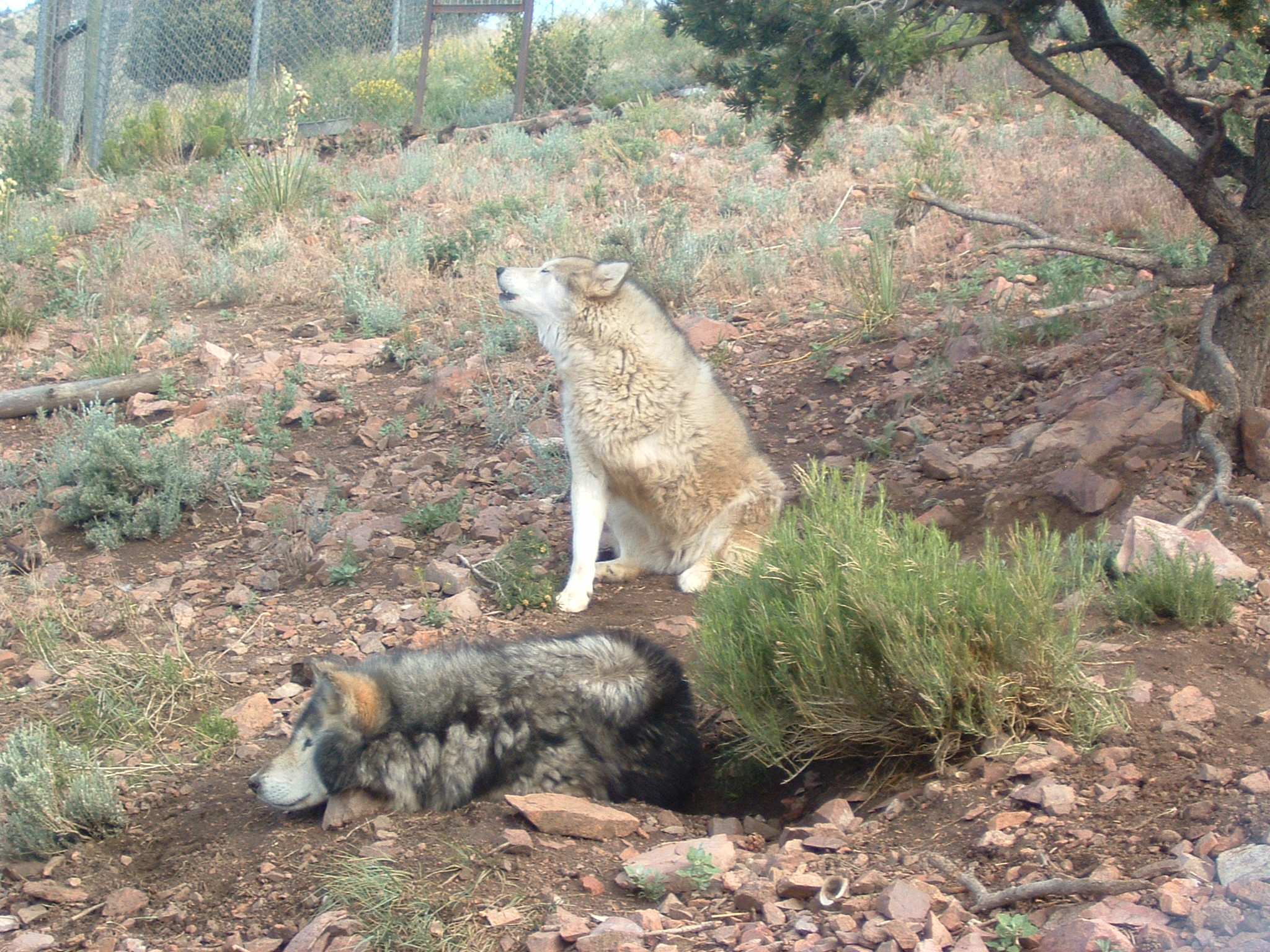
Aurora (White, Howling) and Rogue (Black, Lying down), two wolf-dog crosses at Mission: Wolf

Mission: Wolf only takes in wolves who were born in captivity because wolves that are born in captivity can never be returned to the wild. As of December 2018, 26 wolves and wolf-dogs live at Mission: Wolf. Since founding, Mission: Wolf has had to turn down over 9,000 requests to take in wolves and wolf-dogs.

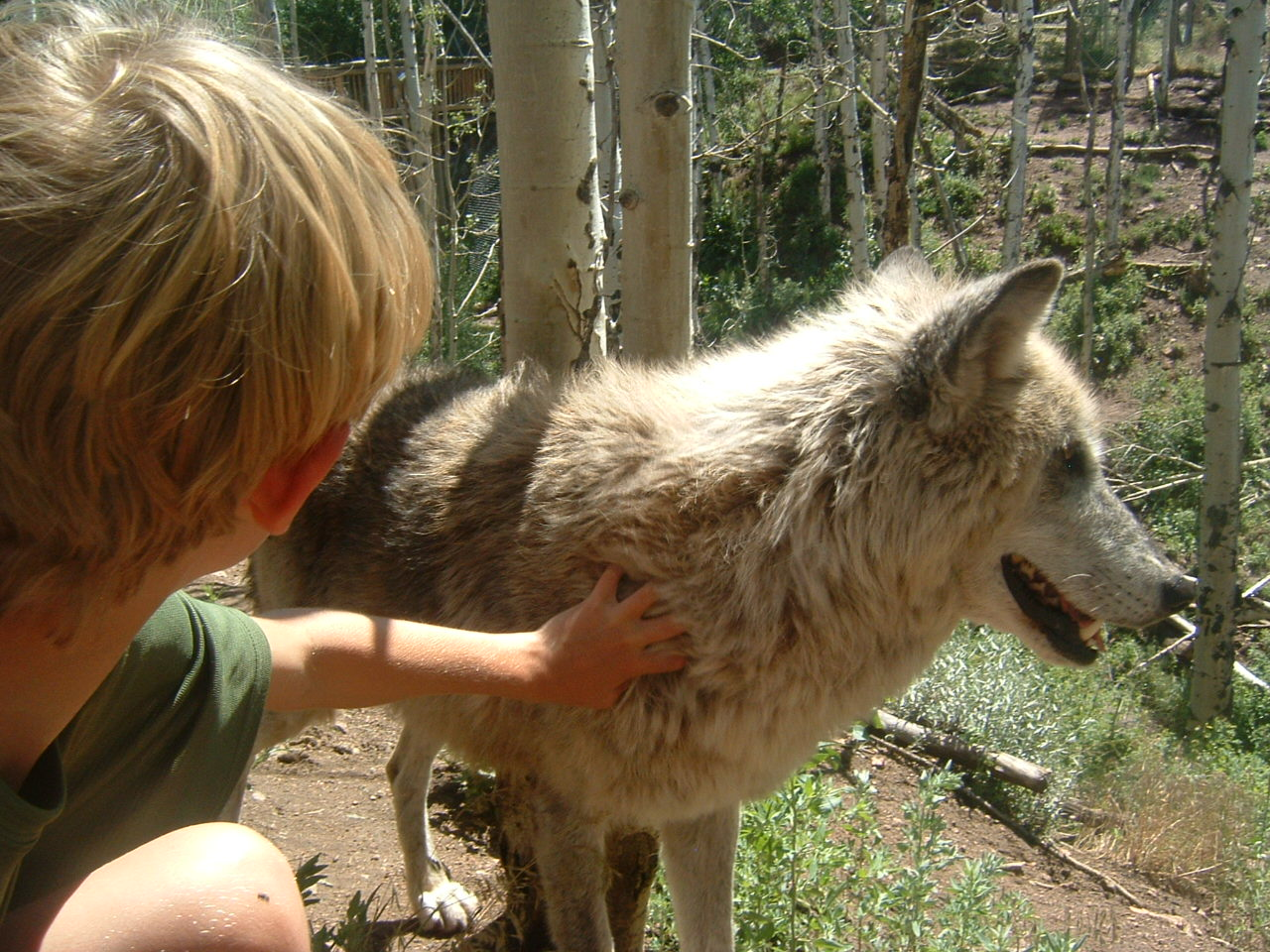
Maggie interacting with a young visitor

The sanctuary is open to visitors. There is no entry free, but donations of cash and in-kind donations are welcomed. The sanctuary is located at the end of 15 mi (24 km) of dirt road that climbs to 9,000 ft (2,700 m), and weather can make the road difficult or impassible. Depending on the day and the attitude of the animals, visitors may be able to interact directly with the wolves.

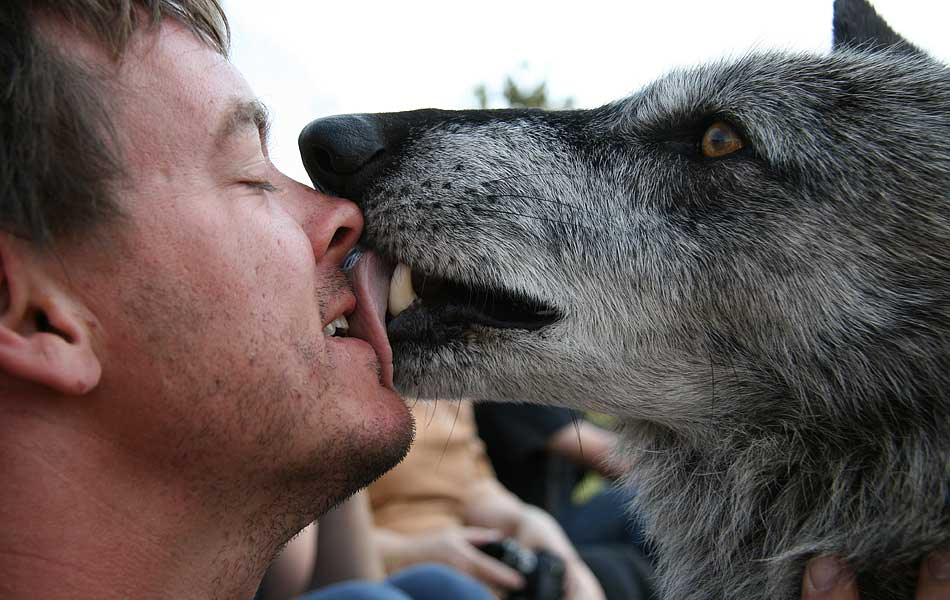
Raven, a former Ambassador wolf, greeting a visitor enthusiastically

Mission: Wolf also tours America as a part of its Ambassador Wolf Program, traveling thousands of miles in the Wolfhound, a full-size Greyhound bus that was converted to be able to house at least two adults and two wolves and associated supplies. The Ambassador Program has visited schools, universities, NGOs and nonprofits, as well as governmental organizations.

=== Feeding ===
Beginning in the summer of 2008, the wolves were fed a small portion once a day in what is called "daily feed". This is mainly used as a way to provide vitamin supplements and medications to the wolves and check on their health; before that, the wolves had only received the feast-and-famine cycle of two large meals a week, similar to their eating schedule in the wild. This is now called "big feed", and still occurs twice a week, though the wolves get slightly less food, as some is stored away for daily feed.
