= North Mountain Animal Sanctuary =

Canadian animal charity

North Mountain Animal Sanctuary is a registered charity which works to provide care, comfort, and rehabilitation to abused, unwanted and neglected farm animals in the Annapolis Valley, Nova Scotia, Canada.

The sanctuary began in 2008, by buying land on the North Mountain, and achieved charitable status in 2010.

North Mountain Animal Sanctuary provides shelter for goats, rabbits, sheep, ducks, pigs, and chickens. The sanctuary tries to prevent the future suffering and neglect of farm animals by raising public awareness.
