= Barby Keel Animal Sanctuary =

English animal sanctuary

- Established: 1979
- Founder: Barby Keel
- Type: Nonprofit
- Location: Bexhill-on-Sea, England
- Coordinates: 50°52′19″N 0°27′34″E

The Barby Keel Animal Sanctuary is an animal sanctuary in Bexhill-on-Sea, East Sussex, England. Founded in 1979 by Barby Keel, the sanctuary cares for abused and abandoned animals, and has cared for over 10,000 animals in its history.

== History ==
Barby Keel and her partner purchased four acres of land in Bexhill-on-Sea in the 1970s. They began caring for animals when a British Army soldier asked her to watch his dog, named Cat, while he was deployed in Northern Ireland; the soldier never returned for the dog. She adopted another dog and soon thereafter was asked by the Bexhill Cats Club to care for some cats. Keel's partner eventually asked her to choose between him and the animals, and she helped him pack his bags to leave.

The Barby Keel Animal Sanctuary was founded in 1979, and it initially homed three animals. She later began to take care of farm animals such as pigs, sheep, goats, and cows. Some of the animals are rehomed, but most live permanently on the sanctuary. The sanctuary purchases dog and cat food and resells it at half price so that others can more easily afford to care for their own animals. The sanctuary is open to guests at an annual open day fête, which helps to raise funds. In April 2026, Keel was invited to a garden party at Buckingham Palace to meet Charles III in recognition of her work at the sanctuary.

The sanctuary has a no-kill policy, except for in cases when euthanasia is medically necessary. As of 2025, the sanctuary housed around 600 animals, with around 10,000 having lived there over its history. Keel was 90 years old as of 2025, and has survived cancer three times. She has no plans to retire. There are plans for trustees to continue caring for the animals at the sanctuary after Keel dies. Keel has written four books.
