= Sadhana Forest =

International non-profit organization

Sadhana Forest is a volunteer-based international nonprofit organization focused on ecological regeneration, vegan community living, and environmental education. Founded in 2003 by Yorit and Aviram Rozin in Auroville, India, Sadhana Forest now runs eight long-term ecological projects across four countries: India, Haiti, Kenya, and Namibia. These projects engage local communities and international volunteers in reforestation, water conservation, and sustainable living practices rooted in compassion and selfless service.

== Locations ==
Sadhana Forest carries out long-term ecological and community-based projects across eight locations in four countries: India, Haiti, Kenya, and Namibia. While each project shares the same core focus, reforestation, water conservation, and community empowerment, their implementation is adapted to local ecological and cultural contexts.

The first project began in 2003 in Auroville, India, with the reforestation of the endangered Tropical Dry Evergreen Forest, of which less than 0.01% remains. In 2020, projects expanded to Meghalaya, where tree-planting and environmental training centers were established in the tribal regions of Khasi, Garo, and Jaintia. In 2023, a project began in Virudhunagar District, Tamil Nadu, supporting rural communities in planting indigenous, drought-resistant, food-producing trees in arid zones.

In Haiti, a project was launched in 2010 in the southeastern community of Anse-à-Pitres. In 2014, the organization began a similar initiative in Samburu County, Kenya. In 2023, Sadhana Forest launched its newest project in the Kunene Region of Namibia, working with the Himba tribe.

== Reforestation and Food Forests ==
Sadhana Forest addresses climate change and food insecurity through its veganic agroforestry and permaculture projects. The organization plants drought-resistant, food-producing trees to restore ecosystems and support food sovereignty. This work is done without using animal agriculture, labor, or animal-derived products. Sadhana Forest has planted 350,000 trees and naturally regenerated 750,000 trees. These efforts have also contributed to the return of 150 wild animal species. The organization's programs also focus on empowering women and marginalized communities.

== Water Conservation ==
Sadhana Forest implemented water conservation efforts. The efforts are focused on building trenches, dams, and bunding in order to redistribute and reallocate water throughout the forest. In order to give community members access to consistent water sources, hand pumps and wells were also built.

== Farm Animal Sanctuary ==
Sadhana Forest operates a farm animal sanctuary that is open for visitors. Volunteers and visitors are encouraged to connect with the rescued cows through consent-based programming.

== Volunteers and Tourists ==
Over the past 2 decades, Sadhana Forest has hosted over 5,000 participants. The organization hosts and empowers volunteers and tourists that come from every corner of the world who have come to aid in the revitalization of the Sadhana Forest. There, tourists learn sustainable practices that are important to keeping the environment and forests safe, and they leave the experience with greater knowledge of responsible use conservation.

== Visitor Programs ==
The Sadhana Forest Auroville project is open to visitors, and provides daily activities free of charge. The organization offers over 60 weekly guided tours and visitors can participate in a variety of programs, including:

- Workshops: Connecting with Cows, Plant-based Nutrition, and Plant-Based Cooking Classes.
- Events: Weekly Documentary Screenings, Monthly Potlucks, and Annual Vegan Forest Festivals.
- Children’s Land is an educational space designed for local children to engage with nature through activities such as gardening, tree planting, art, and games. The program emphasizes experiential, child-led learning focused on environmental awareness based on principles of unschooling.
- The Tea Hut is a space that provides free vegan chai and snacks and acts as a gathering place to encourage community interaction with locals of the region. The Tea Hut also has an outdoor gym.

== Awards ==
On November 25, 2010, Sadhana Forest Haiti and India won third place for the Humanitarian Water and Food Award.

In December 2024, Sadhana Forest was nominated for the Indian Responsible Tourism Awards 2024. Sadhana Forest won silver in Sustainable Leadership - Travel Enterprises. The Award was supported by Incredible India! India's national tourism program.

Sadhana Forest also received the Earth Guardian Award at the Vegan India Conference 2025.
