= Goathouse Refuge =

Animal sanctuary in Pittsboro, US

- Goathouse Refuge logo
- Founded: 2007
- Founder: Siglinda Scarpa
- Type: 501(c)(3)
- Location: Pittsboro, North Carolina
- Services: Cat Sanctuary
- Website: www.goathouserefuge.org

The Goathouse Refuge in Pittsboro, North Carolina, is a nonprofit no-kill animal sanctuary for cats that is run on a volunteer-basis. The refuge is cage-free, with the cats roaming around within the boundaries of the property. Founded in 2007 by Italian-born artist Siglinda Scarpa, the refuge can hold up to 300 cats on a 16-acre farm. There is an art gallery located on the first floor of the house where Scarpa sells her handmade art such as pottery, sculptures, and cookware to help support the refuge.

== Founding ==
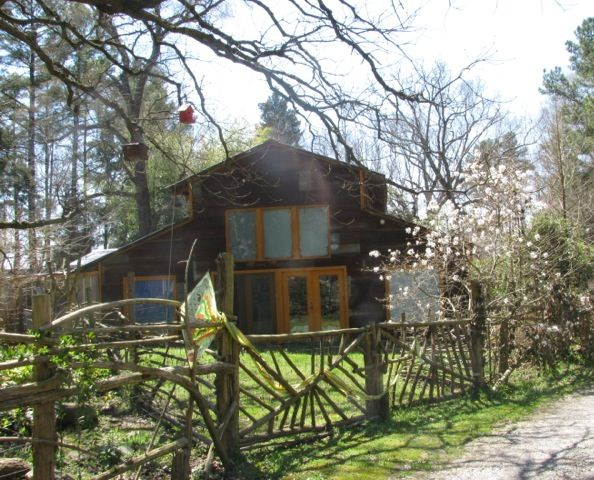
Goathouse Refuge main building

Siglinda Scarpa says she had issues with communication as a child, stating that "people were not seeing me, that they were talking, but never to me." Her father gave her a stray kitten, but when it was a year old, it became very ill and died. After his death, Scarpa decided to take in as many cats as possible, with the hopes of eventually creating a safe haven for cats. Scarpa created the Goathouse Refuge in 2007, naming it after an old goat who came with the plantation house and the 16 acre property. Originally, the land was just intended for her pottery studio. After the house and studio burned down, Scarpa rebuilt it with plans that included a sanctuary for cats, using personal resources and proceeds from her pottery sales to make it possible.

== Operations ==
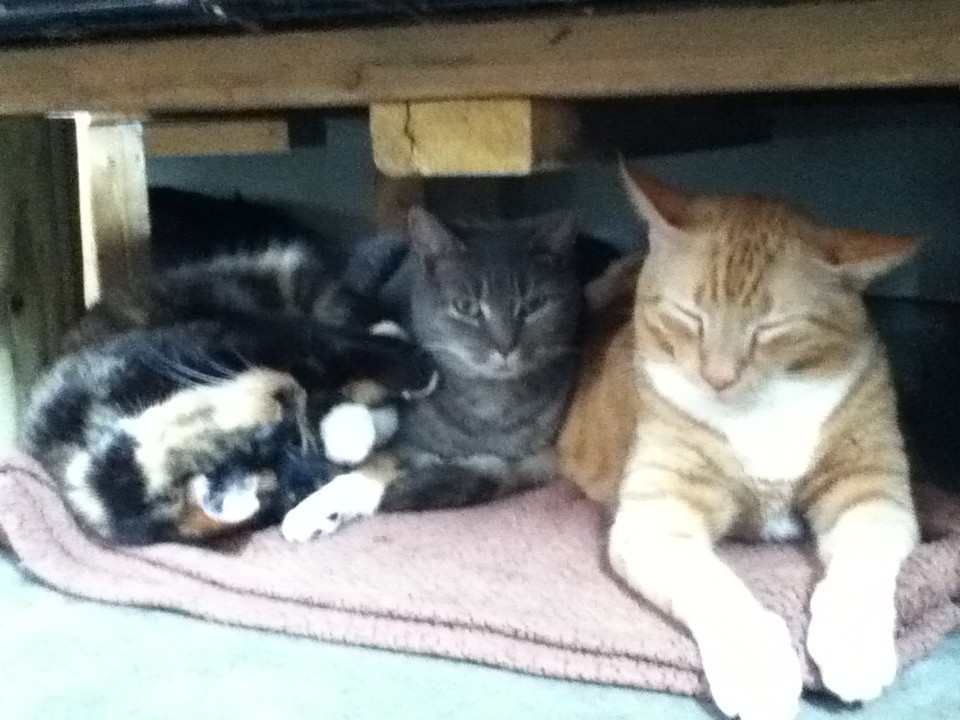
Cats at the Goathouse Refuge

As a nonprofit shelter, the Refuge is run mainly by volunteers. There are two shifts of at least two volunteers each who look after the cats and socialize them to be ready for adoption. In its first five years, the refuge has found homes for over 900 cats. No cats are rejected or subjected to euthanasia unless past all hope of recovery. Unadoptable cats may live out their lives on the property as well.

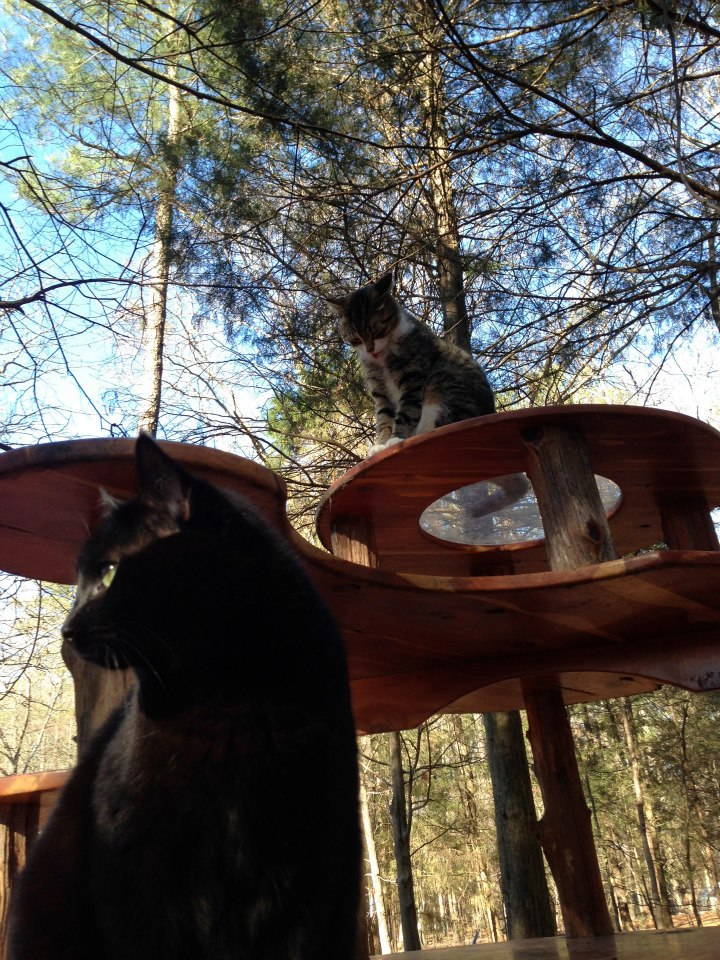
Cats playing in the large Goathouse Refuge yard

Goathouse Refuge relies on donations to help cover medical treatment, food, toys and other items. The Goathouse Refuge has the option to sponsor a cat by donating to cover their adoption fees so that the cat may have a higher chance of being adopted. The refuge also provides "virtual cats" as gifts and will send the donor a photo of a cat of their choice, as well as a behind-the-scenes story about them.
