= Kota Kinabalu Wetland Centre =

Wetland in Sabah, Malaysia

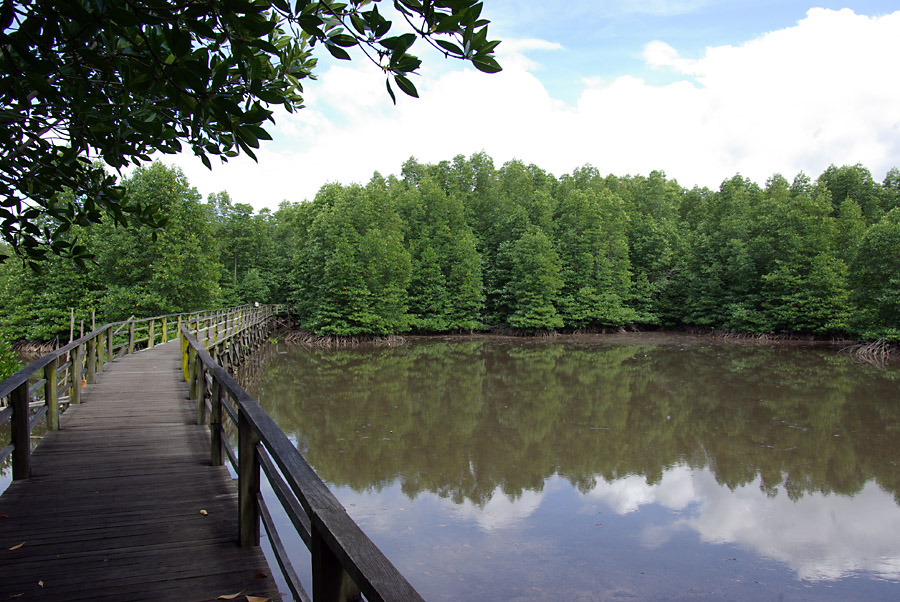
- Wetland Centre

- Location within East Malaysia
- Location: Kota Kinabalu, Sabah, Malaysia
- Coordinates: 5°59′08″N 116°05′12″E
- Area: 24 ha (59 acres)
- Established: 1986
- Website: www.sabahwetlands.org/kkw/

Ramsar Wetland
- Official name: Kota Kinabalu Wetland
- Designated: 22 October 2016
- Reference no.: 2290

Kota Kinabalu Wetland Centre is 24 hectares (59 acres) of the only remains of mangrove forest that once existed extensively along the coastal region of Kota Kinabalu, Malaysia. Previously known as Likas Swamp or Likas Mangrove and later Kota Kinabalu City Bird Sanctuary, the Centre came foremost out of 20 wetlands selected by the Sabah Wetlands Inventory Committee in 1986.

The centre is an important refuge and feeding ground for many species of resident birds, as well as several migratory bird species from Northern Asia. In addition, it is a breeding ground for marine life protected by the Fishery Department of Sabah.

Apart from providing shelter and food for both resident and migratory species of wildlife, wetlands also prevent salt build-up in surrounding freshwater supplies, stabilising sedimentation, storing nutrients and removing toxins.

== Wildlife ==
Birds from around the globe, including non-breeding winter visitors, are commonly sighted at the sanctuary, especially during migratory season of Asian birds (i.e. Sept-April).

Common visitors

- Little egret, a winter visitor to Borneo;
- Striated heron, a winter visitor from the mainland of Asia;
- White-winged tern, a common migrant and winter visitor throughout Greater Sunda Islands
- Black-crowned night-heron, a non-breeding visitor to Sumatra and North Borneo;
- White-breasted waterhen, a common resident;
- Marsh sandpiper, a winter visitor from Siberia and China;
- Common moorhen, a common breeding bird in marshy environments and well-vegetated lakes outside Antarctica and Australasia;
- Cinnamon bittern, a breeding bird in tropical Asia, some northern birds migrate in short distances;
- Common redshank, a widespread breeding bird across Europe and northern Asia;

Rare sightings

- Lesser adjutant stork, a resident breeder in Southern Asia;
- Nankeen night heron

Year-round residents

- Crested myna
- Yellow-vented bulbul
- Yellow-bellied prinia
- Magpie robin
- Pacific swallow
- Spotted dove
- Collared kingfisher
- Purple heron
- Green pigeons

Other mangrove wildlife includes monitor lizards, fiddler crabs, mudskippers, weaver ants, butterflies and other insects, jellyfish, water snakes and mud lobsters.
