= Tiger Haven =

- Tiger Haven Inc
- Formation: September 1991; 33 years ago
- Type: Nonprofit
- Tax ID no.: 62-1536897
- Legal status: 501(c)(3)
- Headquarters: Kingston, Tennessee
- Website: https://www.tigerhaven.org/

Tiger Haven is a non-profit 501(c)3 sanctuary for big cats in Roane County, Tennessee. The sanctuary has been in operation since September 1991.

As of December 2020, Tiger Haven reports having over 250 animals in sanctuary, all but 10 of which are tigers, lions, leopards, and cougars. The remaining 10 includes servals, caracals, and bobcats. The sanctuary houses rescued animals deemed to be abused, abandoned or neglected. The facility occupies a 200-acre (81 ha) property. Tiger Haven has never been a roadside zoo by being open to the public and does not exploit the animals by public exhibition and never has. Tiger Haven does no commercial activity with any animal. Tiger Haven is a true sanctuary, with no buying, selling, breeding, or loaning of any animal.

The facility is operated by Tiger Haven, Inc. The facility is a non profit IRS 501(c)3 non-profit. In 1991 it was granted a Tennessee Wildlife Resources Agency permit allowing it to keep tigers and other big cats on the premises. The animals receive regular veterinary care from the University of Tennessee College of Veterinary Medicine (UTCVM), including on-site visits to sanctuary premises. In 2011, the UTCVM class of 2014 voted to donate proceeds from the first UT College of Veterinary Medicine Charity Golf Classic to benefit Tiger Haven.

== Controversy ==
Neighbors of the facility expressed concern that animals might escape and could be heard. However, the lawsuit was dismissed in March 2013.
