= Santuario Igualdad Interespecie =

Animal sanctuary

Santuario Igualdad Interespecie ('Sanctuary of Equality between Species'), Santiago de Chile, is an animal sanctuary in the commune of El Monte, about 50 kilometers from Santiago. It was launched on November 3, 2014, by Marisol de la Reguera and Ariel Maluenda.

It was set up in 2011, by two activists of the organization Elige Veganismo ('Choose Veganism'). After witnessing the harsh life faced by animals in the meat, poultry and dairy industries, they decided to leave their traditional life in Santiago to build the sanctuary to allow animals to live in dignified conditions and freedom for the rest of their lives.

The sanctuary is a refuge for farm animals. Its mission is to give a safe and permanent home to animals that have been rescued from abuse and abandonment.

They work to give to the refugees all necessary veterinary treatments and attend to their emotional necessities as well. In addition, the sanctuary promotes the vegan style life to stop animals suffering. Fighting for a better future and fair treatment to the animals.

People can collaborate to support this sanctuary in different ways:

- Being a volunteer.

- People donations in campaigns and benefit events.

- Being a godmother / godfather of one or more refugees, by given a monthly cooperation to them. Contributors can visit their goddaughters / godsons one or two days per month and receive photos of them.

Today, the sanctuary has more than 80 animals including pigs, cows, sheep, goats, chickens and ducks. Also, dogs and cats.

The sanctuary has hopes for expansion, possibly to form a sanctuary project in the Los Ríos Region.
