= Redwings Horse Sanctuary =

British horse charity and sanctuary

- Founder: Wendy Valentine
- Registration no.: 1068911
- Location: Norfolk, England
- Website: www.redwings.org.uk

Redwings Horse Sanctuary is a registered charity that provides a home for rescued horses, based in Norfolk, England.

== Aims ==
According to RHS, their "primary purpose is to provide and promote the welfare, protection and care of horses, ponies, donkeys, and mules that have suffered from maltreatment, neglect or poor circumstance. Our work has three main themes – rescue and rehabilitation, specialist sanctuary care and prevention through education".

== History ==
Redwings was founded in 1984 by Wendy Valentine, who subsequently left to form Hillside Animal Sanctuary in 1995. Redwings is now the largest horse charity in the UK. Redwings provides a safe home for rescued horses, ponies, donkeys and mules who have been neglected and ill-treated, such as those rescued from Spindles Farm in 2008, the largest case of equine animal cruelty ever seen in the UK at the time.

In October 2005 Redwings merged with the Ada Cole Memorial Stables in Essex. In 2015 it merged with Mountains Animal Sanctuary in Forfar, Angus in Scotland and in 2019 it merged with SWHP in South Wales. Redwings now has sites across the UK with visitor centres in Norfolk, Essex, Scotland and Warwickshire. According to the Annual Return for 31 Dec 2015 it had income of £12.01 million and expenditure of £10.00 million.

== See also ==
- List of animal sanctuaries
