= Lower Moss Wood Educational Nature Reserve and Wildlife Hospital =

UK nature reserve

Lower Moss Wood Wildlife Hospital is an establishment in Knutsford, Cheshire, England, which provides an educational reserve, and wildlife rescues in the UK, via veterinary treatment and sheltered sanctuary accommodation during recovery. It helps 2000+ sick and injured animals every year.

Its team of volunteers has been caring for and rehabilitating animals from all over the UK since 1983. (The wildlife hospital began in 1988, according to another source). The wood is a nature reserve consisting of 18 acres of mixed woodland, representing a Grade B Site of Biological Importance.

LMWWH's educational programme reaches out to the local community, and it provides an outdoor education experience to primary school children, and a wildlife club for children 6 yrs and upward. The wildlife hospital is not open for viewing, but visiting parties can learn about the work that takes place there during their trip.

Early in 2015, Ray Jackson, owner of the Lower Moss Wood wildlife centre, hosted a special opening of a new state-of-the-art building and facilities, led by the charity’s patron Bobby Charlton; another supporter is Teresa Amory – Chairman of the British Wildlife Rehabilitation Council.
