= Primate Rescue Center =

Primate sanctuary in Kentucky

- Interactive map of Primate Rescue Center
- 37.846079°N 84.638457°W
- Date opened: September 1987
- Location: Wilmore, Kentucky; United States
- Land area: 30 acres
- No. of animals: 50+
- No. of species: 12 recognised: Pan troglodytes Macaca nigra Cebus; Colobus guereza Ateles vellerosus Macaca fascicularis Macaca nemestrina Macaca mulatta Macaca fuscata Cercopithecus aethiops Hylobates syndactylus Papio anubis
- Website: primaterescue.org

The Primate Rescue Center is a primate rescue organization founded by Clay Miller and April Truitt in the late 1980s. The PRC is a 501(c)(3) nonprofit organization located in Wilmore, Kentucky, United States, approximately 17 miles south of Lexington, Kentucky. The PRC provides lifetime sanctuary for rescued primates from all over the United States, and is home to over 50 primates, including a troop of 11 common chimpanzees.

== Mission ==
The PRC works to alleviate the suffering of primates wherever it occurs by:

- Providing sanctuary or referral to appropriate facilities;
- Working to end the trade in pet primates in the U.S. and abroad;
- Educating the public about the plight of primates caught in the breeder/dealer cycle;
- Assisting researchers and zoo personnel in finding appropriate placement for their surplus primates;
- Encouraging compliance with applicable local, state and federal laws, such as various animal welfare statutes.

The staff at the PRC has also worked closely with the Kentucky state government, and in particular with the Kentucky Department of Fish and Wildlife Resources, in helping to draft now-enacted regulations against the importation of primates into the state by private individuals.

== Resident species ==
Most primates that end up at the center are former pets, but some species, like the rhesus macaque and olive baboon are common laboratory animals. The center is currently home to over fifty animals of the following twelves species:

- Pan troglodytes - common chimpanzee
- Macaca nigra - celebes crested macaque
- Cebus - capuchin monkey
- Colobus guereza - black-and-white colobus
- Ateles vellerosus - spider monkey
- Macaca fascicularis - long-tailed macaque
- Macaca nemestrina - Southern pig-tailed macaque
- Macaca mulatta - rhesus macaque
- Macaca fuscata - Japanese macaque
- Cercopithecus aethiops - vervet monkey
- Hylobates syndactylus - siamang gibbon
- Papio anubis - olive baboon
