= 73 Cows =

- Jay Wilde in a promotional image for 73 Cows
- Directed by: Alex Lockwood
- Produced by: Alex Lockwood
- Starring: Jay Wilde; Katja Wilde
- Cinematography: Oliver Walton
- Production company: Lockwood Film
- Release date: 30 September 2018 (Raindance)
- Running time: 15 minutes
- Country: United Kingdom
- Budget: £1,000

73 Cows is a 2018 documentary short about Jay and Katja Wilde, farmers in England who gave their herd of beef cows to the Hillside Animal Sanctuary and took up vegan organic farming. It was directed and produced by Alex Lockwood. In 2019, 73 Cows won the BAFTA Award for Best Short Film at the 72nd British Academy Film Awards.

== Synopsis ==
The film is told through interviews with Jay and Katja Wilde of Bradley Nook Farm, Ashbourne, Derbyshire, along with footage of them, their farm, and their cows. They introduce their connection to the farm: Jay inherited it from his father, but came to see cows as individuals with feelings and personalities. This made him uneasy about eating them and about raising them for food. Katja came to the UK on a two-month educational assignment, and lived and worked at Bradley Nook. Jay told her about his unease with cattle farming, and invited her to live with him. She then planned to change the farm so that cows were not slaughtered.

Jay discusses his feelings about taking cows to the abattoir, and his feeling that he was betraying his cows. Katja explains that, for a decade after her arrival, cows were still slaughtered, but that this was having a very negative impact on Jay. Katja feels she was more able to harden her heart than Jay, but she, too, felt that what they were doing was horrible. Selling the farm and fields was an obvious solution, but not one they wanted to make.

Jay explains that they first installed solar panels, and then unsuccessfully sought planning permission for a wind turbine. They then explored vegan organic agriculture. Katja talks about the excitement and difficulties faced by the prospect of switching to vegan organic agriculture; this was, ultimately, viable. Jay expresses his desire to support and maintain the farm, and then the challenge of what would be done with the remaining cows. Sending them to slaughter, he felt, would be a bad start to vegan farming, and so they sought space for them at animal sanctuaries. This novel possibility led to tension with other farmers. Katja explains the pressure on farmers, and how £40,000-50,000 would be lost by sending the cattle to a sanctuary rather than slaughter. The process of finding sanctuary space for the cows was long and stressful, but the Hillside Animal Sanctuary, in Norfolk, agreed to take the entire herd. This was, for Jay, an ideal result. After the cattle had moved to Hillside, Katja and Jay began receiving letters of praise and support. Katja explains that sending the cattle to Hillside changed Jay.

Jay and Katja visit Hillside, and Jay says how the cows are clearly no longer his. He talks of his relief at no longer being involved in beef farming, and how the cows can live out their lives peacefully.

== Background, production and release ==
Jay Wilde grew up around cattle farming, though faced reservations about the ethics of raising cows for food. When he inherited the 173 acre Bradley Nook farm from his father in 2011, he moved from dairy farming to organic beef production, believing this to be less harmful to the cows. In summer 2017, after meeting with The Vegan Society, he and his wife Katja gave most of their herd to the Hillside Animal Sanctuary and took up vegan organic farming, with plans to develop a range of affiliated businesses, such as a restaurant, a cookery school, and a shop; the remaining members of the herd stayed at Bradley Nook as "pets".

Alex Lockwood was introduced to the Wildes' story by his wife. He initially assumed that someone would already be making a documentary about the Wildes, and so did not contact them for some time. When he did finally contact them, he was excited to be told that he could tell their story. The Wildes were surprised to be contacted by Lockwood, as the initial publicity surrounding the cows going to Hillside had died down. Lockwood got to know the Wildes well before beginning to film, and, while he had a clear vision of the film's plot points, this changed a great deal through the production process.

73 Cows was produced by Lockwood Film. It was directed, produced, and edited by Alex Lockwood, with cinematography by Oliver Walton, and sound by John Roddy. Production assistance was provided by Nishat Raman, and title design was by Ana Orio. Lockwood said that the production crew "set out with no budget and a team of only four". The only money spent, Lockwood said, "was on petrol for two cars making six 90-minute journeys each way".

73 Cows was filmed primarily with Canon EOS C500 and Canon EOS-1D C cameras, with an AKG Blue Line microphone used for sound-capture. The team produced two hours of film of Jay, and filmed Kajta for a single hour. A one-off shot of cows running across a field at Hillside was shot with a drone. In the scene, they "literally jumped for joy", which Lockwood said "makes the film". Slow-motion is utilised throughout the film. In the eyes of one critic, this both evokes the simplicity of farming life and matches with "Jay’s soft-spoken and melancholy nature".

The film premiered on 30 September 2018 at the Raindance Film Festival in London before being uploaded to the internet on 5 October. Jay did not watch an online preview of the film, seeing it for the first time at Raindance. After producing the film, Lockwood switched from a vegetarian to a vegan diet. He said this "was surprisingly easy to do, and this is the first winter in about eight years I haven't had a persistent cough". In addition to the film's vegan message, Lockwood identifies the theme of mental health: "Jay spent his life doing something he hated and saw no way out of. This drove him to depression, yet, he managed to overcome it. I hope that people who watch [73 Cows] will understand that they have the power to make positive change in their own lives."

== Reception ==
=== Critical response ===
73 Cows received a very positive review from Jason Sondhi of Short of the Week. Sondhi called the film "a profile in courage", praising the film as having "everything you ideally want in a short documentary: it has an intriguing top-level premise, it elicits truly emotional and compelling performances from its on-camera subjects, and [it is filled] with beautifully composed and cinematic images". The tone and pace of the piece, he said, "contribute to a melancholic sense of spiritual unrest". His only criticism was that a few minutes could have been removed from the middle third, cutting out some repetition. Meanwhile, Catherine Shoard and Andrew Pulver, writing in The Guardian, called 73 Cows "a lovely little film".

=== Accolades ===
At the 2018 Ottawa International Vegan Film Festival, 73 Cows was awarded Best Overall Film and Best Lifestyle Film. It was also nominated for Best Local Film at the 2018 Birmingham Film Festival. It won the BAFTA Award for Best British Short Film at the 72nd British Academy Film Awards in February 2019.
