= Hotel Tajikistan =

Hotel in Dushanbe, Tajikistan

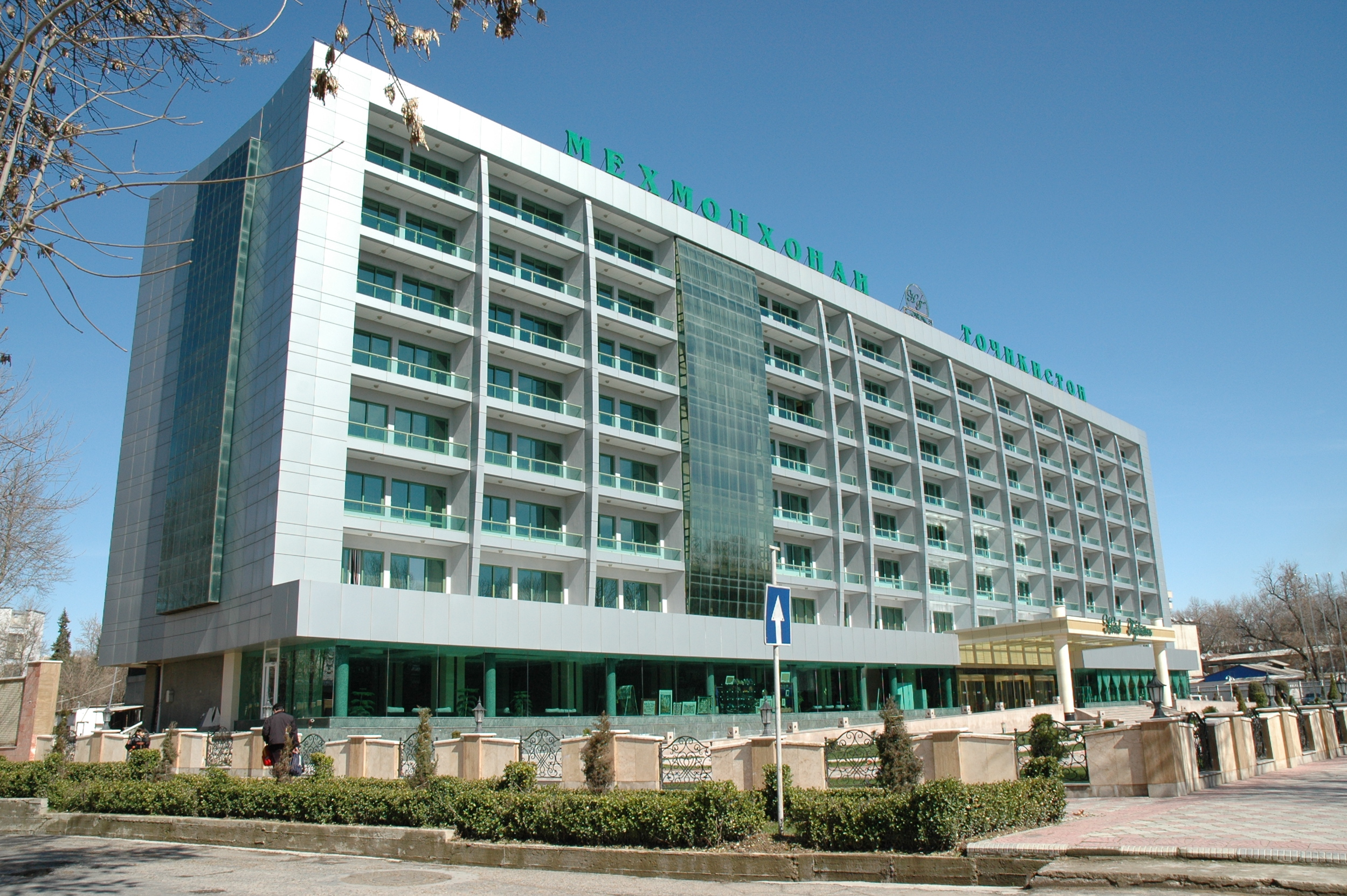

- Location within Tajikistan

General information
- Location: 22 Shotemur Ulitsa, 734001, Dushanbe, Tajikistan
- Coordinates: 38.5790°N 68.7845°E
- Opening: 1975

Hotel Tajikistan is a hotel located at 22 Shotemur Ulitsa, 734001, Dushanbe, Tajikistan. It is a 4-star hotel and was built in 1975 and reconstructed in 2002. A short story titled "Hotel Tajikistan" which is about the hotel in the 1990s was published by Hackwriters.com.
