= Willows Animal Sanctuary =

Animal sanctuary in Scotland

Coordinates: 57.58605°N 2.15609°W

Willows Animal Sanctuary is an animal sanctuary in Fraserburgh, Aberdeenshire, Scotland.

== History ==
Willows Animal Sanctuary was founded, on a 54-acre plot, in 1999.

=== Events since 2010 ===
In 2011 there was concern for the finances at Willows Animal Sanctuary. This was eased with patronage from Paul Rodgers who arranged a number of benefit gigs to raise funds for the sanctuary, including one at the Royal Albert Hall.

In 2013, Willows Animal Sanctuary returned to a farmer a lamb which he claimed was his. It had been found and rescued from drowning in a stream by a schoolgirl who subsequently requested it be homed at the sanctuary, where it had proved to be a popular animal.

In 2015 Willows Animal Sanctuary joined with 3 other sanctuaries in the region (the New Arc centre at Ellon, the Blaikiewell Animal Sanctuary at Maryculter, and Halfpenny Farm in Kintore) to form a new umbrella group called 'REACH', to stand up for the wellbeing of animals in need.

== Animals ==
Willows Animal Sanctuary permanently houses over 300 rescued animals of multiple species. ('Nearly 400' according to one source). These include horses, llamas, donkeys and 55 cats. Some animals from the sanctuary are used for therapy and in some cases visit local hospitals.

== Animal Assisted Therapy unit ==
Willows Animal Sanctuary's Animal Assisted Therapy unit has been in operation, working with vulnerable people, in conjunction with the local authority at least since 2003. In 2017 Willows was described as having a service level agreement with Aberdeenshire Council in this field.
