= Animal Place =

- Formation: 1989; 37 years ago
- Founders: Kim Sturla and Ned Buyukmihci
- Tax ID no.: 68-0200668
- Legal status: 501(c)(3)
- Purpose: Animal protection
- Locations: Grass Valley, California; Petaluma, California
- Website: animalplace.org

Animal Place, which was founded in 1989, is one of the oldest and largest sanctuaries for farmed animals in the United States. The main facility is located on 600 acres in Grass Valley, Nevada County, California, and provides refuge to roughly 300 neglected farmed animals at one time. In addition to the permanent sanctuary, Animal Place operates a 12-acre adoption center in Petaluma, California.

== History ==
Animal Place was started in 1989 by Kim Sturla and Ned Buyukmihci, who purchased 60 acres in Vacaville, California. In 2009, the sanctuary purchased its 600 acre permanent sanctuary in Grass Valley.

Once the Grass Valley site was acquired, the original Vacaville location became known as the Rescue Ranch, and was used as a location to adopt out animals who were not going to live permanently in Grass Valley. In 2018, the Vacaville location was sold because local ordinances required that no more than 100 animals live on the property at one time. In 2019, a 12-acre replacement property, dubbed the Rescue Ranch 2.0, was purchased in Petaluma.

== Mission ==
Animal Place extends support to all life with a special emphasis on farmed animals. This is executed by providing permanent sanctuary, education, legislation and appropriate placement of needy animals.

== Awards ==
Animal Place (Grass Valley, California) won first prize in the “Best Sanctuary” category, earning $50,000 for the organization.

== Tax exempt status ==
Animal Place is a 501(c)(3) charitable organization.
