= Black Pine Animal Sanctuary =

Exotic animal sanctuary in Indiana, U.S.

- Date opened: 1994
- Location: Albion, Indiana, United States
- Land area: 18-acre (7.3 ha)
- No. of animals: 75–100
- No. of species: 40–50
- Annual visitors: 19,000
- Website: www.bpsanctuary.org

The Black Pine Animal Sanctuary (formerly Black Pine Animal Park) is an 18-acre (7.3 ha) exotic animal sanctuary located in Albion, Indiana, United States.

The sanctuary provides permanent refuge for displaced, captive-raised exotic animals kept as "pets" or retired from performance. The population typically ranges from 75 to 100 animals representing between 50 and 60 species, some of which are endangered. Various educational visitor and outreach programs are offered, including guided sanctuary tours, school field trips, and special events. Animals are housed in natural habitats scattered throughout a partially wooded site, and in buildings. Visitors view them from behind protective barriers much like they would in a traditional U.S. zoo. The sanctuary was originally founded as a privately owned zoo, but relocated to this location in 2006 after transitioning to a non-profit, charitable sanctuary. The sanctuary does not buy, sell, breed, trade, or seek out animals, or use animals for entertainment. Displaced, captive-raised exotic animals are provided refuge for the rest of their lives.

The sanctuary is licensed by the United States Department of Agriculture (USDA) as a Class "C" exhibitor, is incorporated (as of 2000) as Professional Animal Retirement Center (PARC), Inc. and is a 501(c)(3) non-profit organization.

== History ==
Black Pine Animal Sanctuary began operating in 1994 as a privately owned for-profit corporation. It was originally known as Black Pine Exotics and, later, Black Pine Animal Park. The earliest educational programming offered was to local preschools and primary schools who took field trips to see the animals and learn about them. In the mid-1990s the sanctuary added a gift shop and established a regular tour schedule during the summer season for the general public.

In 1998, following the launch of the sanctuary's first web site, visitor attendance began to steadily increase. In 2004, over 17,000 visitors from all over the U.S. and several other countries visited. In 2003, the sanctuary reorganized and began operating under Professional Animal Retirement Center (PARC), Inc., a 501(c)(3) tax exempt non-profit corporation.

In December 2006, the sanctuary completed a relocation to its current site. The sanctuary is managed by a volunteer board of directors, a paid staff that includes a full-time executive director, facilities manager, animal keepers, fund development coordinator, education coordinator, commissary manager, and an office/gift shop coordinator. Additional support is provided by interns and volunteers.

In April 2010, the sanctuary's Board of Directors officially change the organization's "doing business as" name from Black Pine Animal Park to Black Pine Animal Sanctuary to more accurately reflect the non-profit mission and its policy of no buying, selling, breeding, trading, or commercial use of animals.

== Exhibits ==
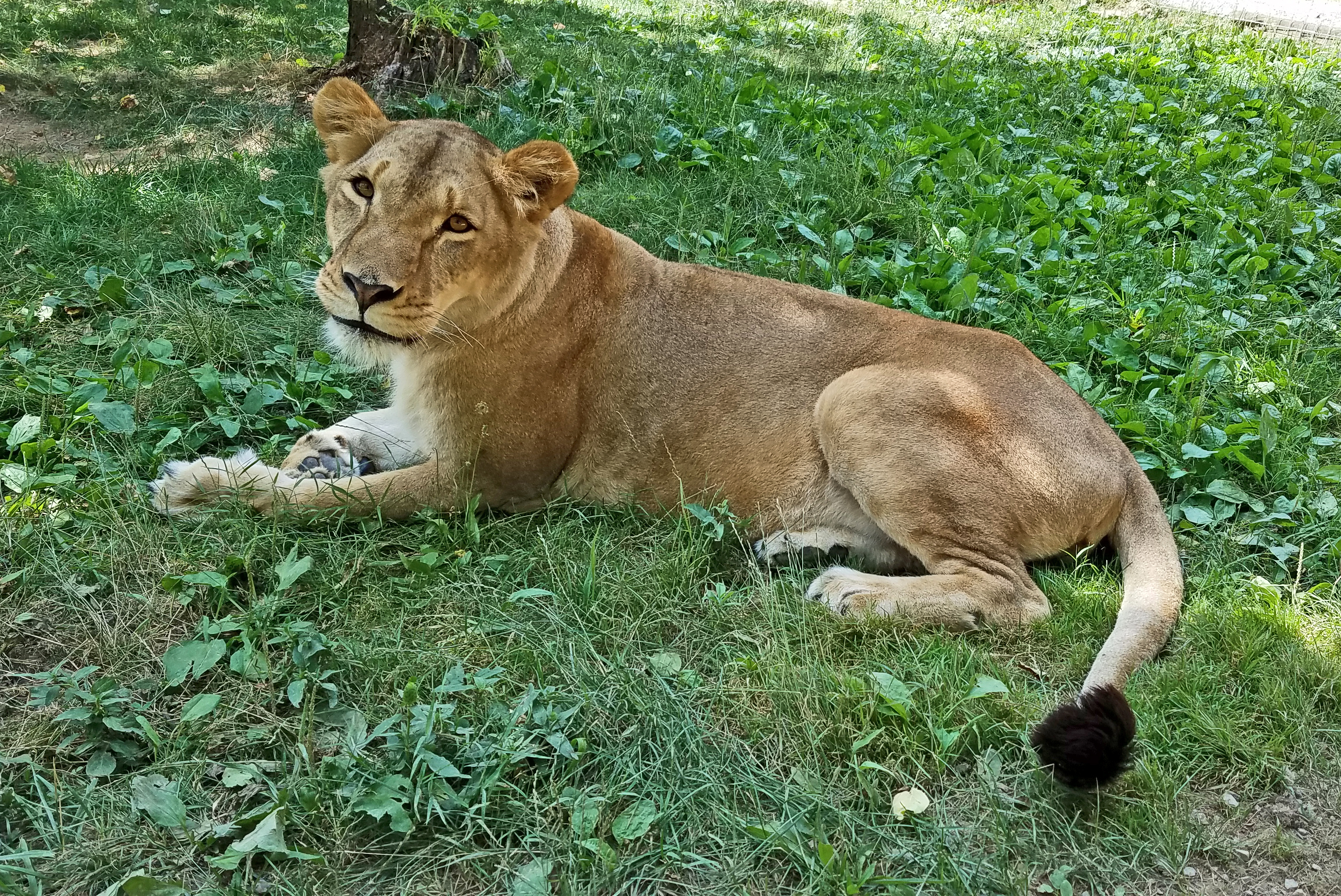
Africa was a lioness (RIP) at Black Pine Animal Sanctuary in Albion, Indiana

A walking tour of the sanctuary explores eight areas: grazing animals, primate house, north tiger house, west end (including Dr. Sam's Clinic and quarantine, Betsy's (bear) house, the woods, reptile house, and aviary.

Residents include donkeys, pot-belly pigs, rheas, emus, fallow deer, macaques, spider monkeys, kinkajous, coatimundi, cotton-top tamarins, alligator, tortoises, snakes, lizards, tigers, leopards, cougars, bobcats, servals, foxes, wolves, black bears, macaws, cockatoos, and more.
