= Christiana, Tennessee =

- Town
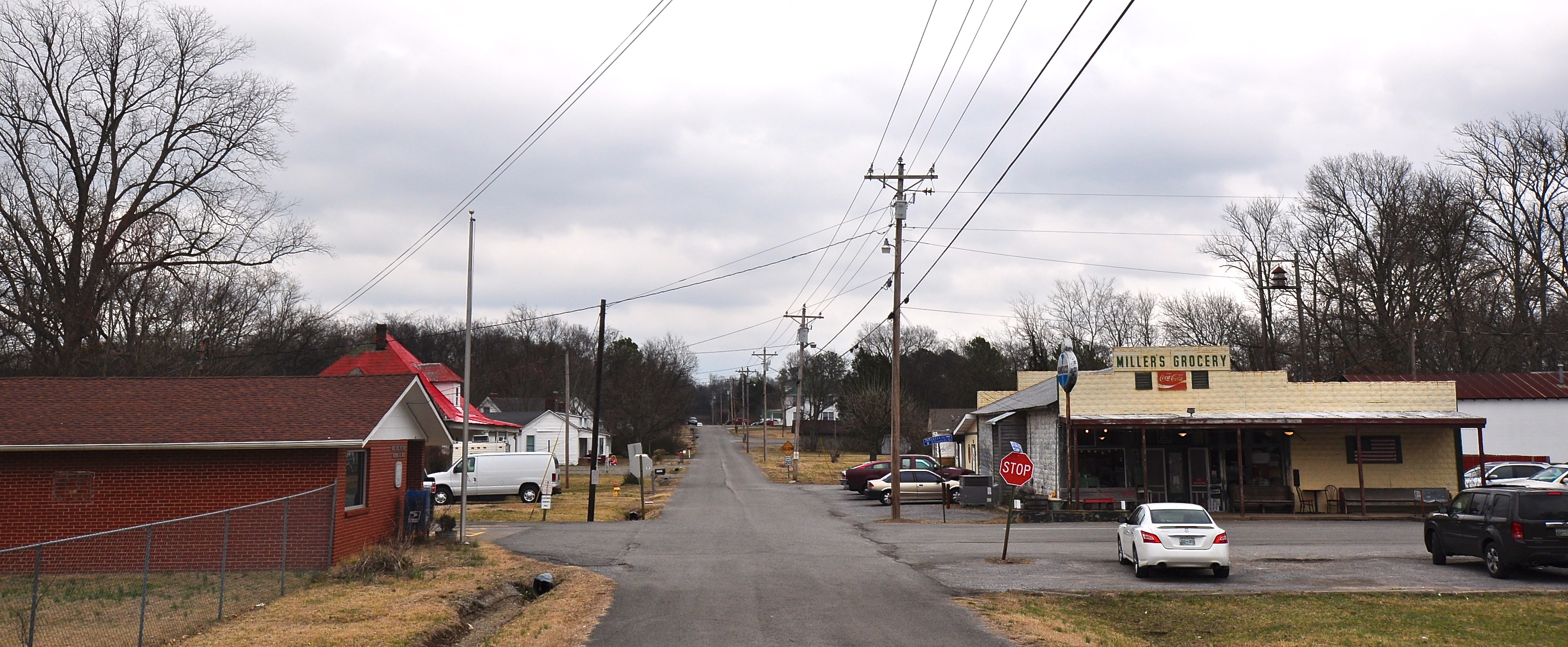
- Christiana in March 2014

- Location within Tennessee Location within the United States
- Coordinates: 35°42′36″N 86°23′58″W
- Country: United States
- State: Tennessee
- County: Rutherford

Area
  - Total: 8.86 sq mi (22.94 km^{2})
  - Land: 8.86 sq mi (22.94 km^{2})
  - Water: 0 sq mi (0.00 km^{2})
- Elevation: 699 ft (213 m)

Population (2020)
  - Total: 4,305
  - Density: 486.1/sq mi (187.68/km^{2})
- Time zone: UTC-6
  - Summer (DST): UTC-5
- ZIP code: 37037
- Area code: 615
- GNIS feature ID: 1280528

Christiana is a town in Rutherford County, Tennessee, United States. It has a post office, with ZIP code 37037. Christiana Middle School is located in the community. Both U.S. Route 231 (US 231) and Tennessee State Route 269 (SR 269) pass through the community.

The 2020 population of the Town was 4,305.

== Demographics ==
Historical population
Census	Pop.	Note	%±
2020	4,305		—
U.S. Decennial Census

=== 2020 census ===
As of the 2020 census, Christiana had a population of 4,305. The median age was 34.0 years. 30.1% of residents were under the age of 18 and 8.2% of residents were 65 years of age or older. For every 100 females there were 93.1 males, and for every 100 females age 18 and over there were 81.4 males age 18 and over.

66.0% of residents lived in urban areas, while 34.0% lived in rural areas.

There were 1,448 households in Christiana, of which 45.2% had children under the age of 18 living in them. Of all households, 66.2% were married-couple households, 11.2% were households with a male householder and no spouse or partner present, and 18.0% were households with a female householder and no spouse or partner present. About 16.9% of all households were made up of individuals and 6.2% had someone living alone who was 65 years of age or older.

There were 1,496 housing units, of which 3.2% were vacant. The homeowner vacancy rate was 1.0% and the rental vacancy rate was 2.0%.

Racial composition as of the 2020 census
Race	Number	Percent
White	3,380	78.5%
Black or African American	373	8.7%
American Indian and Alaska Native	30	0.7%
Asian	82	1.9%
Native Hawaiian and Other Pacific Islander	0	0.0%
Some other race	146	3.4%
Two or more races	294	6.8%
Hispanic or Latino (of any race)	283	6.6%

== History ==
A post office called Christiana has been in operation since 1894. Besides the post office, Christiana contains several country stores and churches.
