= Society for the Prevention of Cruelty to Animals =

Animal welfare organizations

A Society for the Prevention of Cruelty to Animals (SPCA) is a common name for non-profit animal welfare organizations around the world. The oldest SPCA organization is the Royal Society for the Prevention of Cruelty to Animals, which was founded in England in 1824. SPCA organizations operate independently of each other, campaign for animal welfare, and assist in the prevention of cruelty to animals cases.

== SPCA organizations by continent ==
=== Africa ===
- Botswana — Botswana Society for the Prevention of Cruelty to Animals (BSPCA)
- Egypt — General/Cairo SPCA
  - Branches all over Egypt, Cairo SPCA is the oldest association in Africa and the Middle East, established in 1895.
- Kenya — Kenya Society for the Protection and Care of Animals (KSPCA)
- Namibia — Tierschutzverein (SPCA) Swakopmund
- South Africa
  - National Council of SPCAs (NSPCA)
  - Cape Town — Cape of Good Hope Society for the Prevention of Cruelty to Animals
- Zimbabwe — Zimbabwe Society for the Prevention of Cruelty to Animals

=== Asia ===
- Lahore, Pakistan — Society for Prevention of Cruelty to Animals
- Philippines — Philippine Society for the Prevention of Cruelty to Animals
- Singapore — Singapore Society for the Prevention of Cruelty to Animals
- Hong Kong — Society for the Prevention of Cruelty to Animals (Hong Kong)
- Taiwan (ROC) — Taiwan Society for the Prevention of Cruelty to Animals
- Iran — Iran Society for the Prevention of Cruelty to Animals (Tehran, Iran)
- Japan — Public Welfare Corporation Japan Animal Welfare Association
- Bahrain — Bahrain Society for the Prevention of Cruelty to Animals (Askar, Bahrain)
- Thailand — Thai Society for the Prevention of Cruelty to Animals
- Kathmandu, Nepal — Society for the Prevention of Cruelty to Animals Nepal

==== India ====
- Madras - Society for Prevention of Cruelty to Animals
- Dehradun — Society for Prevention of Cruelty to Animals
- Chennai — Madras society for prevention of cruelty to animals
- Cuttack — State society for the prevention of cruelty to animals Odisha
- Kolkata — Calcutta Society for The Prevention of Cruelty to Animals
- Kollam — Society for the Prevention of Cruelty to Animals
- Lucknow — Society for Prevention of Cruelty to Animals
- Mumbai — Bombay Society for Prevention of Cruelty to Animals
- Noida — Society for Prevention of Cruelty to Animals
- Punjab — Society for the Prevention of Cruelty to Animals
- Thane — Thane S.P.C.A
- Visakhapatnam — Visakha Society for the Prevention of Cruelty to Animals
- Jamshedpur — Society for the prevention of cruelty to Animals
- Bihar -Society for Prevention of Cruelty to Animals Avinash Singh

==== Malaysia ====
- Selangor — Society for the Prevention of Cruelty to Animals, Selangor, Malaysia
- Kota Kinabalu, Sabah — Society for the Prevention of Cruelty to Animals, Kota Kinabalu, Sabah, Malaysia
- Kuching — Sarawak Society for the Prevention of Cruelty to Animals, Kuching, Sarawak, Borneo, Malaysia
- Lahad Datu — Society for the Prevention of Cruelty to Animals, Lahad Datu, Sabah, Malaysia

==== Israel ====
- The Society for Prevention of Cruelty to Animals, Tel Aviv-Yafo
- The Society for Prevention of Cruelty to Animals, Jerusalem
- The Society for Prevention of Cruelty to Animals, Ramat Gan
- The Society for Prevention of Cruelty to Animals, Haifa
- The Society for Prevention of Cruelty to Animals, Rehovot
- The Society for Prevention of Cruelty to Animals, Be'er Sheva

=== Europe ===
- Belgium — Royal Society of Animal Protection Veeweyde
- France — Société Protectrice des Animaux (SPA)
- Italy — SPCA ITALIA Protezione Animali
- Norway — SPCA Norge
- Romania — Romanian Society for the Prevention of Cruelty to Animals (RSPCA)
- The Netherlands — Dierenbescherming

==== Ireland ====
- Irish Society for Prevention of Cruelty to Animals (ISPCA)
- Dublin Society for Prevention of Cruelty to Animals (DSPCA)

==== Malta ====
- Malta Society for the Protection and Care of Animals (MSPCA)
- Gozo — Gozo SPCA

==== Poland ====
- Society for the Prevention of Cruelty to Animals
- Straż dla Zwierząt

==== United Kingdom ====
- England and Wales — Royal Society for the Prevention of Cruelty to Animals
- Scotland — Scottish Society for Prevention of Cruelty to Animals
- Northern Ireland — Ulster Society for the Prevention of Cruelty to Animals
- Jersey — Jersey Society for the Prevention of Cruelty to Animals
- Guernsey - Guernsey Society for the Prevention of Cruelty to Animals
- Isle of Man - Manx Society for the Prevention of Cruelty to Animals

=== North America ===
==== Canada ====
- Canada — Canadian Federation of Humane Societies
  - Ontario — Ontario Society for the Prevention of Cruelty to Animals
  - – Hamilton and Burlington Society for the Prevention of Cruelty to Animals
  - British Columbia — British Columbia Society for the Prevention of Cruelty to Animals
  - Alberta — Alberta Society for the Prevention of Cruelty to Animals
  - Nova Scotia — Nova Scotia Society for the Prevention of Cruelty
  - Montreal, Quebec — Société Canadienne Pour La Prévention De La Cruauté Envers Les Animaux / Canadian Society for the Prevention of Cruelty to Animals (Montreal)
  - Saskatchewan — Saskatchewan Society for the Prevention of Cruelty to Animals
  - New Brunswick – Society for the Prevention of Cruelty to Animals (SPCA)
  - Northwest Territories, Yellowknife – NWT SPCA

==== United States ====
In the United States, all organizations using the name SPCA are independent; there is no umbrella organization. Some of the more notable organizations include:

- American Society for the Prevention of Cruelty to Animals
- Delaware and other states: Brandywine Valley SPCA (contracts with Washington, DC)
- Houston, Texas — Houston Society for the Prevention of Cruelty to Animals – one of the original featured SPCA's on the Animal Planet Network show Animal Cops: Houston
- Maryland — Maryland Society for the Prevention of Cruelty to Animals
- Massachusetts — Massachusetts Society for the Prevention of Cruelty to Animals
- New Jersey — New Jersey Society for the Prevention of Cruelty to Animals
- New Orleans and Plaquemines Parish, Louisiana: Louisiana SPCA
- Pennsylvania (Philadelphia and other places) — Pennsylvania Society for the Prevention of Cruelty to Animals
- Roanoke Valley, Virginia — Roanoke Valley Society for the Prevention of Cruelty to Animals
- Oregon — Oregon Humane Society - largest SPCA on the West Coast
- Rhode Island — Rhode Island Society for the Prevention of Cruelty to Animals

===== California =====
- Alameda County — East Bay SPCA
- Los Angeles — Los Angeles SPCA
- Monterey County — Monterey County SPCA
- San Francisco —San Francisco SPCA
- Sacramento — Sacramento SPCA
- Orange County — OC Animal Allies

==== Caribbean ====
- Saint Vincent and the Grenadines — Vincentian Society for the Prevention of Cruelty to Animals - The VSPCA is independent and not associated with SPCA International.
- Jamaica — Jamaica Society for the Prevention of Cruelty to Animals (J.S.P.C.A.)
- Trinidad and Tobago — Trinidad and Tobago Society for the Prevention of Cruelty to Animals (T.T.S.P.C.A)

=== Oceania ===
- Australia — Royal Society for the Prevention of Cruelty to Animals Australia (RSPCA Australia)
- New Zealand — Royal New Zealand Society for the Prevention of Cruelty to Animals
- Papua New Guinea — Royal Society for the Prevention of Cruelty to Animals of Papua New Guinea
- Cook Islands — Society for the Prevention of Cruelty to Animals of Cook Islands

== See also ==
- Cruelty to animals
- Animal rights
- Animal welfare
- List of animal welfare organizations
