= Cockfighting Act 1952 =

Act of the Parliament of the United Kingdom

Cockfighting Act 1952 (Note: Section 2(1).)
- Act of Parliament
- Parliament of the United Kingdom
- Long title: An Act to make it unlawful to have possession of any instrument or appliance designed or adapted for use in connection with the fighting of a domestic fowl.
- Citation: 15 & 16 Geo. 6 & 1 Eliz. 2. c. 50
- Territorial extent: England and Wales; Scotland; (Note: Section 2(2).)

Dates
- Royal assent: 30 October 1952
- Commencement: 30 October 1952 (Note: The Acts of Parliament (Commencement) Act 1793.)
- Repealed: Scotland: 6 October 2006 (Note: The Animal Health and Welfare (Scotland) Act 2006 (Commencement No. 1, Savings and Transitional Provisions) Order 2006 (SSI 2006/482).); Wales: 27 March 2007 (Note: The Animal Welfare Act 2006 (Commencement No. 1) (Wales) Order 2007 (SI 2007/1030).); England: 6 April 2007 (Note: The Animal Welfare Act 2006 (Commencement No. 1) (England) Order 2007 (SI 2007/499).)
Other legislation
Amended by	Criminal Procedure (Consequential Provisions) (Scotland) Act 1995
Repealed by	Scotland: Animal Health and Welfare (Scotland) Act 2006; England and Wales: Animal Welfare Act 2006

Status: Repealed

Text of statute as originally enacted

Revised text of statute as amended

The Cockfighting Act 1952 (15 & 16 Geo. 6. & 1 Eliz. 2. c. 50) was an act of the Parliament of the United Kingdom.

The act made it a criminal offence to be in possession of any instrument designed, or adapted for, use in connection with the fighting of any domestic fowl, with such being liable for imprisonment for up to three months, or a fine up to twenty-five pounds, or both.

The act also allows for the court to order the destruction of any such equipment.

== Subsequent developments ==
The whole act was repealed for Scotland by section 55(1) of, and paragraph 9(e) of schedule 2 to, the Animal Health and Welfare (Scotland) Act 2006 (asp 11), which came into force on 6 October 2006.

The whole act was repealed for England and Wales by section 68(3) of, and schedule 4 to, the Animal Welfare Act 2006, which came into force for Wales on 27 March 2007 and for England on 6 April 2007.

The whole act was repealed for England by section 68(3) of, and schedule 4 to, the Animal Welfare Act 2006 (c. 45), which came into force on 6 April 2007 (SI 2007/499).
