= Scottish Society for Prevention of Cruelty to Animals =

Scottish animal welfare charity

Scottish Society for the Prevention of Cruelty to Animals
- Founded: 1839; 187 years ago
- Type: Charity
- Purpose: Animals
- Headquarters: Dunfermline
- Location: Dunfermline, Fife, Scotland
- Website: www.scottishspca.org

The Scottish Society for the Prevention of Cruelty to Animals (also known as the Scottish SPCA and SSPCA) is a charity to promote animal welfare in Scotland.

== History and operations ==
It was founded in Edinburgh in 1839 and one of its first aims was to improve the welfare of cart-horses. Over the next century and a half, the charity grew and merged with other local SPCAs, such as the Dundee SPCA, the Glasgow and West of Scotland SPCA and the Aberdeen SPCA.

The Scottish SPCA opened its first centre in Mansfield, Balerno, in 1930. It acted as a rest farm for horses which provided many working horses and ponies a period of rest before being returned to work. Following recent closures, the SSPCA now has 7 animal rescue centres which treat over 12,000 animals a year. Its headquarters and animal helpline are based in Dunfermline.

As an animal welfare charity, the society receives no government or lottery funding and relies on public donations to continue their work rescuing and rehoming mistreated animals in Scotland.

The Scottish SPCA is the only animal welfare charity in the United Kingdom that is a specialist reporting agency to the Crown Office and Procurator Fiscal Service. This enables it to lay reports for prosecutions, given there is no effective system of private prosecution in Scotland. This power is coupled with the designation of the Scottish SPCA's inspectors under section 49(2)(a) of the Animal Health and Welfare (Scotland) Act 2006, which enables SSPCA Inspectors to exercise powers of entry, search, seizure and issue of binding notices under the Act, such as "care notices". The Scottish SPCA is the only animal welfare organisation in Great Britain to have such powers.

In promoting prevention of cruelty, the Scottish SPCA is unique in running a free visiting education service for schools, tying in extensively with the Scottish curriculum. Since devolution, the Scottish SPCA has been at the forefront of campaigning in the Scottish Parliament for improved animal protection laws in Scotland and were prominent advisors on the Animal Health and Welfare (Scotland) Bill which obtained Royal Assent in May 2006.

In August 2023, BBC News Online reported that the Scottish SPCA planned to close its Caithness and Ayr rescue centres by October that year. The Scottish SPCA citied the need to adapt to increasing demand and complex animal welfare cases.

=== Relationship with RSPCA ===
The Scottish SPCA is often confused with the Royal Society for the Prevention of Cruelty to Animals (RSPCA). Although the two societies both work with animal welfare, the RSPCA operates only in England and Wales while the Scottish SPCA only covers Scotland. Both charities are entirely separate from each other. The RSPCA has been criticised by the Scottish SPCA for fund-raising in Scotland and thereby "stealing food from the mouths of animals north of the border by taking donations intended for Scotland". The RSPCA insists that it does not deliberately advertise in Scotland but that many satellite channels only enabled the organisation to purchase UK-wide advertising. Despite this, many Scottish people often incorrectly call their local animal welfare charity "the RSPCA".

In a statement, the RSPCA said it went "to great lengths" to ensure wherever possible that adverts were not distributed outside England and Wales. It said: "Every piece of printed literature, television advertising and internet banner advertising always features the wording 'The RSPCA is a charity registered in England and Wales'". "All Scottish donors, who contact us via RSPCA fundraising campaigns, are directed to the Scottish SPCA so that they can donate to them if they so wish." A memorandum was signed between the Scottish SPCA and the RSPCA that any legacies left to the "Scottish RSPCA" or "RSPCA Scotland" would, unless evidence existed to the contrary, be given to the Scottish SPCA.

The Scottish SPCA changed its logo in 2005 to make a clearer distinction between itself and the RSPCA in an attempt to prevent legacies being left to its English and Welsh equivalent by mistake when the Scottish charity was intended.

== See also ==
- Animal welfare in the United Kingdom
- Royal Society for Prevention of Cruelty to Animals
- Ulster Society for the Prevention of Cruelty to Animals
- List of animal welfare groups
