= The Animal Law Foundation =

British animal law charity

- Abbreviation: ALF
- Founded: 2022; 4 years ago
- Type: Charity
- Purpose: Animal law
- Location: London, England
- Region served: UK
- Method: Legal research
- Founder and executive director: Edie Bowles
- Website: animallawfoundation.org

The Animal Law Foundation (ALF) is a British charity focused on researching areas of animal law and, where necessary, bringing legal interventions. The organisation conducts legal research, produces educational resources, and supports or initiates legal challenges aimed at ensuring that existing animal welfare laws are correctly interpreted and applied in practice.

== History ==
The Animal Law Foundation (ALF) was founded by solicitor Edie Bowles, who serves as its executive director. Bowles is also the managing director of Advocates for Animals, a British law firm specialising in animal protection law. The ALF was established in response to what it describes as a gap between the existence of animal welfare legislation in the United Kingdom and its practical enforcement.

== Programmes and research ==
=== Animal welfare enforcement ===
The ALF publishes a report documenting the gap that exists when animal welfare laws are in place but not adequately enforced. The initial report with Animal Equality summarised data gathered between 2018 and 2021 from Freedom of Information requests and animal protection organisation investigations and revealed poor levels of enforcement of welfare legislation for farmed animals. The ALF has since updated the report twice with data from 2022 and 2023 and found that rates of inspection and non-compliance have decreased.

=== Tail docking ===
In 2022, The ALF found that in 13 investigations conducted into British pig farms, tail docking was present on 11 farms (85%), despite the practice being illegal on a routine basis. The ALF worked to persuade the government to reduce pig tail docking, after making the case that vets were likely authorising illegal mutilations.

=== Chicken handling ===
In 2024, the British government changed the law to permit lifting chickens by their legs on farms and during loading and unloading, despite the practice being banned by the Council Regulation (EC) No 1/2005, which until recently the relevant provision still applied in the United Kingdom.

The ALF is challenging the government's removal of this welfare protections for chickens through judicial review by the High Court. In 2026 it made its full hearing before the Court.

=== Boiling decapod crustaceans alive ===
Since its launch, the ALF argued that the Welfare of Animals at the Time of Killing Regulations 2015 in England applied to decapod crustaceans such as crabs and lobsters and that as practices including boiling crustaceans alive cause avoidable suffering they were prohibited under existing animal welfare law. In 2025, the government agreed with the ALF's interpretation and banned the practice.

=== Food chain misinformation ===
In 2025, the ALF reported that advertising and media representations of animal farming in the United Kingdom commonly use idealised imagery that does not reflect the predominantly intensive conditions in which most farmed animals are raised, contributing to consumer misunderstanding about animal welfare standards in the food supply chain.

=== Farmed fish guidance ===
In 2025, the ALF secured a commitment from the Scottish Government to produce official guidance on farmed fish welfare, arguing that without it there are no clear, legally enforceable standards to ensure compliance with existing animal welfare law and to prevent unnecessary suffering. The Scottish Government has committed to issuing official guidance on farmed fish welfare to clarify legal obligations and support enforcement under the Animal Health and Welfare (Scotland) Act 2006.

== See also ==
- Animal welfare in the United Kingdom
