= Ulster Society for the Prevention of Cruelty to Animals =

Animal charity in Northern Ireland

The Ulster Society for the Prevention of Cruelty to Animals (USPCA) is an animal charity based and operating in Northern Ireland. It is the primary animal care group in Northern Ireland. After the RSPCA, the USPCA is the second oldest animal welfare organisation in the world, having been founded in 1836.

== History ==
The Ulster Society for the Prevention of Cruelty to Animals (USPCA) is an animal charity based and operating in Northern Ireland. The other SPCA societies operating in the United Kingdom are the Royal Society for the Prevention of Cruelty to Animals (RSPCA) and the Scottish Society for the Prevention of Cruelty to Animals (SSPCA). The USPCA is a registered charity and is the primary animal care group in Northern Ireland. After the RSPCA, the USPCA is the oldest animal welfare organisation in the world, having been founded in 1836. The Society was originally founded as the Belfast SPCA by Francis Calder, a retired naval officer. The charity's first actions involved placement of water troughs around Belfast for working horses. It also campaigned to have an Act of Parliament extending animal welfare laws to Northern Ireland.

The USPCA's remit is the promotion of the welfare of all animals "through education and enforcement". The organisation is small however, having only two officers to cater for the whole of Northern Ireland.

In 2025 the USPCA joined the League Against Cruel Sports to campaign for a ban on hunting animals with dogs, to bring Northern Ireland in line with the rest of the United Kingdom.

== Organisation ==
In 2016 the chief executive Stephen Philpott was sacked after an investigation found gross misconduct. He was later charged with fraud. Nora Smith was appointed a chief executive in 2023. In February 2025 Smith resigned, and later took legal proceedings against the charity relating to a workplace dispute. Four board members had resigned in the previous year.

== See also ==
- Animal welfare in the United Kingdom
- Royal Society for the Prevention of Cruelty to Animals
- Scottish Society for Prevention of Cruelty to Animals
- Irish Society for Prevention of Cruelty to Animals, active in the Republic of Ireland
