= Abandonment of Animals Act 1960 =

Act of the Parliament of the United Kingdom

Abandonment of Animals Act 1960 (Note: Section 3(1).)
- Act of Parliament
- Parliament of the United Kingdom
- Long title: An Act to prohibit the abandonment of animals; and for purposes connected therewith.
- Citation: 8 & 9 Eliz. 2. c. 43
- Territorial extent: England and Wales; Scotland; (Note: Section 3(3).)

Dates
- Royal assent: 2 June 1960
- Commencement: 2 June 1960 (Note: The Acts of Parliament (Commencement) Act 1793.)
- Repealed: Scotland: 6 October 2006 (Note: The Animal Health and Welfare (Scotland) Act 2006 (Commencement No. 1, Savings and Transitional Provisions) Order 2006 (SSI 2006/482).); Wales: 27 March 2007 (Note: The Animal Welfare Act 2006 (Commencement No. 1) (Wales) Order 2007 (SI 2007/1030).); England: 6 April 2007 (Note: The Animal Welfare Act 2006 (Commencement No. 1) (England) Order 2007 (SI 2007/499).)
Other legislation
Amends	Protection of Animals Act 1911; Protection of Animals (Scotland) Act 1912
Repealed by	Animal Health and Welfare (Scotland) Act 2006; Animal Welfare Act 2006

Status: Repealed

Text of statute as originally enacted

The Abandonment of Animals Act 1960 (8 & 9 Eliz. 2. c. 43) was an act of the Parliament of the United Kingdom.

The act made it a criminal offence to abandon an animal, or permit it to be abandoned, "in circumstances likely to cause the animal any unnecessary suffering". The offence was treated as "cruelty" within the terms of section 1(1) of the Protection of Animals Act 1911 (1 & 2 Geo. 5. c. 27), which as amended currently provides for a fine or up to six months imprisonment on conviction.

The act extended to England and Wales, and Scotland, but not to Northern Ireland.

== Subsequent developments ==
The whole act was repealed for Scotland by section 55(1) of, and paragraph 9(g) of schedule 2 to, the Animal Health and Welfare (Scotland) Act 2006, which came into force on 6 October 2006.

The whole act was repealed for England and Wales by section 68(3) of, and schedule 4 to, the Animal Welfare Act 2006, which came into force for Wales on 27 March 2007 and for England on 6 April 2007.

== See also ==
- Animal welfare in the United Kingdom
