= Protection of Animals Act 1934 =

Act of the Parliament of the United Kingdom

Protection of Animals Act 1934 (Note: Section 3(1).)
- Act of Parliament
- Parliament of the United Kingdom
- Long title: An Act to provide further protection to certain animals.
- Citation: 24 & 25 Geo. 5. c. 21
- Territorial extent: England and Wales; Scotland; (Note: Section 3(2).)

Dates
- Royal assent: 17 May 1934
- Commencement: 17 May 1934 (Note: The Acts of Parliament (Commencement) Act 1793.)
- Repealed: Scotland: 6 October 2006 (Note: The Animal Health and Welfare (Scotland) Act 2006 (Commencement No. 1, Savings and Transitional Provisions) Order 2006 (SSI 2006/482).); Wales: 27 March 2007 (Note: The Animal Welfare Act 2006 (Commencement No. 1) (Wales) Order 2007 (SI 2007/1030).); England: 6 April 2007 (Note: The Animal Welfare Act 2006 (Commencement No. 1) (England) Order 2007 (SI 2007/499).)
Other legislation
Amended by	Criminal Procedure (Scotland) Act 1975; Criminal Law Act 1977; Criminal Justice Act 1982; Criminal Procedure (Consequential Provisions) (Scotland) Act 1995
Repealed by	England and Wales: Animal Welfare Act 2006; Scotland: Animal Health and Welfare (Scotland) Act 2006

Status: Repealed

Text of statute as originally enacted

Revised text of statute as amended

The Protection of Animals Act 1934 (24 & 25 Geo. 5. c. 21) was an act of the Parliament of the United Kingdom effectively making rodeo, as it then existed, illegal in England, Scotland and Wales. The law was based upon the perceived cruelty to animals exhibited at western rodeos brought by promotions such as Tex Austin's 1924 "King of the Rodeo" exhibition at Wembley Stadium in 1924, the first such program in England.

The act was repealed and replaced by the Animal Welfare Act 2006 (c. 45) and the Animal Health and Welfare (Scotland) Act 2006 (asp 11) respectively.

== Analysis ==
The first section provided that roping any unbroken horse or untrained bull was illegal. This was followed by prohibitions on "wrestling, fighting, or struggling with any untrained bull", and on stimulating a horse or bull to buck. This last provision would exclude cinch straps specifically designed to irritate the animal or a strap cinched around its genitals. The prohibitions applied not only to the riders and the stock contractors preparing the animals, but to any promoter of the contests or exhibitions.

The penalties were fines of up to 100 pounds, or up to three months in gaol, per violation.

== Geographic scope ==
The last section of the act provided that it was not effective for Northern Ireland.

== See also ==
- Animal welfare in the United Kingdom
