= Cape of Good Hope SPCA =

South African animal welfare organisation

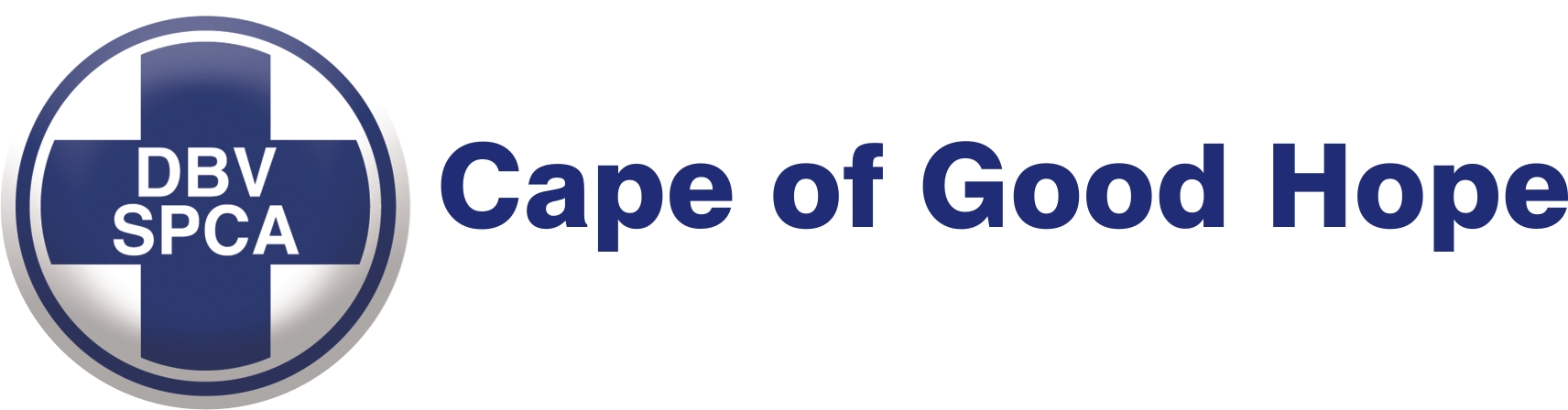
- SPCA logo
- Founded: 20 May 1966
- Founder: John Henry Beebers
- Purpose: Animals
- Location: Grassy Park, Cape Town, South Africa
- Region served: Western Cape
- Chairman: Colette Mang
- CEO: Mqabuko Moyo Ndukwana
- Chief Inspector: Jaco Pieterse
- Patron: Helen Zille
- Affiliations: NSPCA
- Staff: 129
- Website: capespca.co.za

Cape of Good Hope SPCA (Society for the Prevention of Cruelty to Animals) in Cape Town is the founding society of the SPCA movement in South Africa and is the oldest animal welfare organisation in the country, established in 1872. A registered non-profit organisation and Public Benefit Organisation, the society is affiliated to the Royal Society for the Protection of Animals (RSPCA) and are Executive Members of the National Council of SPCAs South Africa (NSPCA), as well as a member of the World Animal Protection organization.

== History ==
The Cape of Good Hope SPCA was founded on 20 May 1872, becoming the founder society of the SPCA movement and animal welfare in South Africa.

== Mobile Clinics ==
The Cape of Good Hope SPCA Mobile Clinic programme operates in informal settlements and impoverished communities around Cape Town, the mobile units provide primary veterinary care and educate owners about responsible pet care. Dipping, de-worming and vaccinating are among the vital services they provide. Animals in need of sterilisation – and those that are ill or injured – are transported to The Cape of Good Hope SPCA Animal Hospital for further treatment, and returned to their owners afterwards.

On 24 August 2015, the first Mobile Clinic operating in Gugulethu was launched. This was made possible by resident Thamsanqa Paliso, who approached Proportional Representation (PR) Councillor Constance Leputhing, of Ward 44, to arrange with the Cape of Good Hope SPCA to launch the Mobile Clinic in the area.

== Charity Shop fire 2014 ==
On 14 November 2014, the Cape of Good Hope SPCA Charity Shop burned down in what was a suspected arson attack. The fire could not be contained by fire-fighters, and subsequently the entire charity shop that consisted of three Wendy houses were destroyed.

== Covid-19 2020 ==
On 27 March 2020 the government of South Africa announced a national lockdown to combat the spread of the deadly virus Covid-19. This meant that the SPCA had to close its doors to the public and could only assist with animal related emergencies. During the lockdown the SPCA housed 23 staff members onsite to care for the animals at the SPCA. The SPCA cares for over 500 animals at one time.

== R24,000 fine for Mitchells Plain animal cruelty case ==
The Cape of Good Hope SPCA recently secured a victory for animal rights in the Mitchells Plain Magistrate’s Court, when a resident was found guilty of animal cruelty and handed a fine of R24 000 or 12 months’ imprisonment, suspended for five years. The magistrate also declared the suspect, who pleaded guilty to three counts of animal cruelty, unfit to own or be in charge of any animal again. The SPCA confiscated 5 adult dogs and 2 puppies that were kept chained and in very poor condition. The owner was warned more than once and failed to comply with the demands of the SPCA.

== See also ==
- Society for the Prevention of Cruelty to Animals
- National Council of SPCAs
