= Jersey Society for the Prevention of Cruelty to Animals =

- Formation: 1868; 158 years ago
- Legal status: Chartity
- Purpose: Animals
- Official language: English

The Jersey Society for the Prevention of Cruelty to Animals (also referred to as the JSPCA, Jersey SPCA), founded 1868; 158 years ago, is a nonprofit organization based in Jersey, with the aims of preventing cruelty, promoting knowledge, and providing for aged, sick, lost and unwanted animals within Jersey.
