= DSPCA =

Irish animal welfare charity

Dublin Society for the Prevention of Cruelty to Animals
- Abbreviation: DSPCA or Dublin SPCA
- Formation: 1840
- Registration no.: CHY 1047
- Legal status: Registered charity
- Purpose: Humane care for animals
- Headquarters: Dublin, Ireland
- Region served: Dublin
- Website: www.dspca.ie

The Dublin Society for Prevention of Cruelty to Animals or DSPCA is a registered charity, established in 1840 to prevent cruelty to animals in Dublin in Ireland.

== History ==
The Dublin Society for Prevention of Cruelty to Animals was established in 1840, and is the oldest and largest animal welfare charity in Ireland.

Initially the organisation was known as the "Dublin Auxiliary of the Royal Society for the Protection of Animals", and it was founded the year the RSPCA received Royal Patronage. The charity has had a number of names, and was known at different times as the "Dublin Home for Starving and Forsaken Cats" or the "Cats and Dogs Home".

Between 1840 and 1990, the DSPCA was based at Grand Canal Quay in Dublin city centre. In 1990, it moved to Stocking Lane in the Dublin suburb of Rathfarnham. The land had been bequeathed to the charity in 1936 as a place to graze retired working horses. In 2003, the charity moved to a new premises on Mount Venus Road in Rathfarnham. In 2010, the DSPCA constructed a new pet boarding centre, and in 2011 a new veterinary clinic was opened.

The DSPCA continues to care for sick, injured and cruelly treated animals in the city and county of Dublin. It describes itself as the "only animal welfare charity in the city that cares for all animals, domestic and wild".

== Organisation and activities ==
The DSPCA (sometimes known as the Dublin SPCA) is involved in investigating suspected cruelty, providing animal ambulance services, caring for animals at its shelter in Rathfarnham, finding new homes for animals, providing information on animal care, providing veterinary care, giving career guidance for those interested in working with animals, and working on legislative changes to improve protection for animals.

The Dublin Society for Prevention of Cruelty to Animals (DSPCA, Irish charity number 1047) is operated and funded separately from the Irish Society for Prevention of Cruelty to Animals (ISPCA, Irish charity number 5619).

=== Shelter ===
The Dublin SPCA shelter is on Mount Venus Road, Rathfarnham. Opened in 2003, the facility offers shelter and care to a wide variety of pets and domesticated animals. The centre is also used to house a number of injured and young wildlife awaiting release including swans, foxes, badgers and small birds.

=== Mobile clinic and ambulances ===
The Dublin SPCA operates four mobile clinics which offer subsidised veterinary treatment for pets whose owners are in receipt of welfare benefit.

The charity also operates four ambulances which cover the Dublin area, responding to emergency calls from the public. Ambulance crews collect sick and injured animals, deal with road traffic accidents, trapped or sick animals, and animals that need to be removed from a situation of cruelty.

=== Inspectorate ===
DSPCA's inspectors investigate complaints of cruelty and neglect, provide guidance to animal owners where necessary, and initiates prosecution for offences.
