= Animal Welfare Act 2006 =

Act of the Parliament of the United Kingdom

Animal Welfare Act 2006 (Note: Section 69.)
- Act of Parliament
- Parliament of the United Kingdom
- Long title: An Act to make provision about animal welfare; and for connected purposes.
- Citation: 2006 c. 45
- Territorial extent: England and Wales (Note: Section 67.)

Dates
- Royal assent: 8 November 2006
- Commencement: 8 November 2006 and onwards (Note: Section 68.)
Other legislation
Amends	Metropolitan Police Act 1839; Cinematograph Films (Animals) Act 1937; Magistrates' Courts Act 1980; Zoo Licensing Act 1981
Repeals/revokes	Protection of Animals (1911) Amendment Act 1921; Protection of Animals Act 1934; Cockfighting Act 1952; Protection of Animals (Anaesthetics) Act 1954; Abandonment of Animals Act 1960; Protection of Animals (Anaesthetics) Act 1964; Protection of Animals (Penalties) Act 1987; Protection against Cruel Tethering Act 1988; Protection of Animals (Amendment) Act 2000
Amended by	Coroners and Justice Act 2009; Animals (Scientific Procedures) Act 1986 Amendment Regulations 2012; Courts Reform (Scotland) Act 2014 (Consequential Provisions No. 2) Order 2015; Veterinary Surgeons and Animal Welfare (Amendment) (EU Exit) Regulations 2019; Animal Welfare (Service Animals) Act 2019; Animal Welfare (Sentencing) Act 2021; Criminal Justice Act 2003 (Commencement No. 33) and Sentencing Act 2020 (Commencement No. 2) Regulations 2022; Judicial Review and Courts Act 2022 (Magistrates’ Court Sentencing Powers) Regulations 2023; Retained EU Law (Revocation and Reform) Act 2023 (Consequential Amendment) Regulations 2023
Relates to	Animal Health and Welfare (Scotland) Act 2006

Status: Amended

History of passage through Parliament

Text of statute as originally enacted

Revised text of statute as amended

Text of the Animal Welfare Act 2006 as in force today (including any amendments) within the United Kingdom, from legislation.gov.uk.

The Animal Welfare Act 2006 (c. 45) is an act of the Parliament of the United Kingdom.

== Overview ==
It is the first signing of pet law since the Protection of Animals Act 1911 (1 & 2 Geo. 5. c. 27), which it largely replaced. It also superseded and consolidated more than 20 other pieces of legislation, such as the Protection of Animals Act 1934 and the Abandonment of Animals Act 1960. The act introduced the new welfare offence.

This means that animal owners have a positive duty of care. The act outlaws owners neglecting to provide for the basic needs of their animals, including access to adequate nutrition and veterinary care.

It outlaws tail docking of dogs for cosmetic reasons, with an exemption for "working" dogs, such as those used by the police, the armed forces or as service dogs.

The act also has an offence to remove the scent glands of skunks kept as pets.

== Commencement ==
The following commencement orders have been made for this act:

- Animal Welfare Act 2006 (Commencement No. 1) (England) Order 2007 (SI 2007/499)
- Animal Welfare Act 2006 (Commencement No. 2 and Saving and Transitional Provisions) (England) Order 2007 (SI 20072711)
- Animal Welfare Act 2006 (Commencement No. 1) (Wales) Order 2007 (SI 2007/1030)
- Animal Welfare Act 2006 (Commencement No. 2 and Saving and Transitional Provisions) (Wales) Order 2007 (SI 2007/3065)
- Animal Welfare Act 2006 (Commencement No. 1) (Scotland) Order 2007 (SSI 2007/519)

== See also ==
- Animal welfare in the United Kingdom
- Animal Health and Welfare (Scotland) Act 2006
