= Catherine Buckle =

Zimbabwean writer

- Born: 1957 (age 68–69); Salisbury, Southern Rhodesia, Federation of Rhodesia and Nyasaland (now Harare, Zimbabwe)
- Occupation: Author
- Writing career
- Period: 2000–present
- Genre: Non fiction
- Subjects: Letters, books, and memoirs about Zimbabwe
- Website: www.cathybuckle.co.zw

Catherine "Cathy" Buckle is a writer and blogger, born 1957, in Southern Rhodesia, which is now modern-day Zimbabwe. Her blog, "Letters from Zimbabwe", includes print, photos, personal entries, and broadcast media outlets. She writes stories about wildlife, conservation, flora and fauna of her country.

== Writings ==
Buckle has written four children's books, one of which, “The Animals of the Shashani.” was in 2018 selected by ZIMSEC as a set book for Form 1 and 2 English Literature students in Zimbabwean schools.

One of her memoirs, African Tears, chronicles the personal story of the government-approved invasion of her farm, which was bought after Zimbabwean independence. African Tears was serialized in The Sunday Times, Femina magazine and, Rapport newspaper.

In the book, Innocent Victims – Rescuing the stranded animals of Zimbabwe's farm invasions, Buckle informs readers of the Zimbabwe Society for the Prevention of Cruelty to Animals's rescues of animals during the farm invasions.

== Bibliography ==
- African Tears. The Zimbabwe Land Invasions. (2001)
- Beyond Tears. Zimbabwe's tragedy. (2002)
- Innocent Victims – Rescuing the stranded animals of Zimbabwe's farm invasions. (2009)
- Imire. The Life and Times of Norman Travers. (2010)
- Can you Hear the Drums. Letters from Zimbabwe 2000 - 2004. (2013)
- Millions, Billions, Trillions. Letters from Zimbabwe 2005 - 2009. (2014)
- Sleeping Like A Hare (2015)
- Rundi. Hand Rearing baby Elephants. (2016)
- When Winners are Losers Letters from Zimbabwe 2009 - 2013. (2018)
- Finding Our Voices Letters from Zimbabwe 2013 - 2017. (2018)
- Surviving Zimbabwe (2020)
