= Louisiana SPCA =

Non-profit organization in Louisiana

The Louisiana Society for the Prevention of Cruelty to Animals (LA-SPCA) is a 501(c)(3) non-profit organization based in Algiers, New Orleans.

The agency contracts with the New Orleans government for animal shelter and animal control services, and it contracts with Plaquemines Parish to operate the parish animal shelter. The New Orleans shelter is in the Algiers area. The Plaquemines shelter is in Belle Chasse.

== History ==
The process of its creation began in 1884 and it was chartered in 1888 to help protect horses and mules. Eliza Poitevent Holbrook Nicholson was the first director of the organization.

A shelter on Japonica Street in the Ninth Ward opened in 1958. It had a capacity of 500 cats and/or dogs.

In 1985 Allen Toussaint made a radio song to advertise the organization, titled "You Can Find a Friend on Japonica Street."

In 2005, in the aftermath of Hurricane Katrina, the organization sought to rescue companion animals. The agency began using a warehouse as its shelter as the hurricane ruined the Japonica Street facility. The replacement animal shelter opened on May 18, 2007.

In 2026 the New Orleans government reduced its budget to the agency. In 2025, the budget from New Orleans to the agency was $3,200,000. This was down to $2,000,000 the following year. Lesli Harris, a member of the New Orleans City Council, stated that the agency should see donations to make up for the reduced budget.
