= Botswana Society for the Prevention of Cruelty to Animals =

Nonprofit organisation in Botswana

- Abbreviation: BSPCA
- Formation: 1979; 47 years ago
- Headquarters: Gaborone
- National Manager: Kenneth Ditshweu

The Botswana Society for the Prevention of Cruelty to Animals (BSPCA) is a nonprofit organisation in Botswana dedicated to protecting the animals of Botswana. The BSPCA specialises in caring for and ensuring the welfare of urban animals such as stray dogs and cats. The BSPCA is headquartered in Gaborone, the capital of the country. As of 2022, its national manager is Kenneth Ditshweu.
