= Tail biting in pigs =

Abnormal behavior in pigs

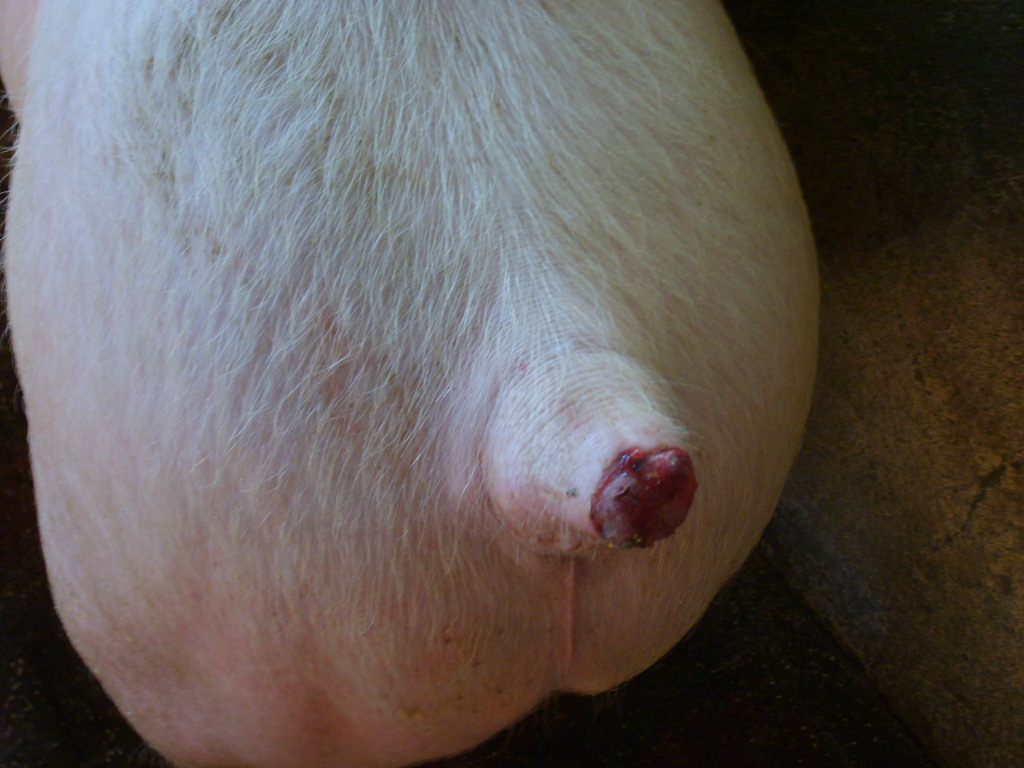
Tail of a pig which has been bitten

Tail biting in pigs is an abnormal behavior whereby a pig uses its teeth to bite, chew or orally manipulate another pigs's tail. Tail biting is used to describe a range in severity from light manipulation of the tail to physically harming the tail, causing infection, amputation or even harming areas surrounding the tail. Tail biting typically occurs under the following conditions: indoor facility with a high density of pigs housed in a confined area (like a pen); lack of a substrate material; poor ventilation system, or poor feed quality and accessibility.

There are three types of tail biting: two-stage, sudden forceful, and obsessive. The type of tail biting is based on the behaviors of each the biter and victim, physical consequences of the bite, and conditions under which the biting happens. A common cause of tail biting is due to pigs feeling stressed or discomfort and are looking for something to divert their attention. Some other causes of tail biting involve possible breed predilections, gender, feed source, substrate materials, gastrointestinal discomfort, and general health of the pig(s). It usually starts out as the pig being curious to investigate its surroundings and begins with harmless nibbling. The nibbling then turns into biting- if blood is drawn from the bite this can cause the pig to bite even more due to their natural appetite for blood.

Tail biting causes major financial and animal welfare issues within the commercial swine industries due to reduced weight gain, treatments, culling, and carcass condemnation. Studies have been done for farmers to identify the risk factors causing tail biting and to implement and experiment ways to reduce and prevent it. The studies ultimately yielded variable results due to the many factors of tail biting and the fact general recommendations are not appropriate for all farms.

== Terminology ==
"Tail biting" mainly refers to bites which cause lesions on the victim., but there has not been a clear definition for "tail biting" so it is common for nibbling without injury to be considered a form of tail biting. Tail biting tends to happen when swine are housed in indoor facilities and in pens where multiple pigs are housed together. Crowding induces stress. Other factors in this circumstance that can cause stress in pigs are a lack of substrate material in the housing environment, a lack of ventilation, lack of quality feed (low salt or low iron diets) or access to the feed. Tail biting even happens out of pure boredom. Stressful situations, boredom and frustration motivate the actions of tail biting.

== Types ==
The certain behaviors and conditions that tail biting happens under can be split up into three types: two-stage, sudden forceful, and obsessive.

1. Two-stage consists of two stages: pre-damage and damaging.
  1. Pre-damage: This is light manipulation of the tail using the mouth of one pig on another. This tends to happen when both pigs are laying. With this type, the victim of the act tends to have little to no reaction to its tail being manipulated. Because pigs have an instinctive rooting behavior, the most likely cause of this type of tail biting is due to lack of a substrate/ground material for the pig to use its rooting behavior on, therefore it uses another pig's tail to fulfill that behavior. Ways to prevent this would be to remove the pig that's "biting" or remove the pigs that are being bitten, and/or provide some substrate or ground material to redirect the biting pig's rooting behavior.
  2. Damaging: The oral manipulation causes the tail to bleed. This type tends to be more forceful where the pig actually bites the tail of the other pig. The victim pig will most likely respond with avoidance behavior, sometimes making sounds to indicate discomfort.
2. Sudden forceful: One pig actually grips onto the tail with its mouth and yanks. It usually happens when both pigs are standing up. The victim will usually display avoidance behavior and/or vocalize discomfort. This can cause wounds, sometimes even amputation. Some things to prevent this again would be to separate the biting pigs from the victim pigs and to provide substrate material or objects for the pigs to root.
3. Obsessive: The biting and yanking is repeated. Again, the response is avoidance behavior. The wounds are more severe and include partial or full amputation. To prevent, separate the bitten and victim pigs and treat the injured pigs.

== Causes ==
Pigs go through teeth changes at ages 3–4 weeks and 7–8 months. Like humans and many other species, they go through teething phases which can prompt them to start tail biting. Pigs also have a natural tendency to chew and an attraction to blood, therefore if they start chewing on a tail and draw blood, it makes it harder for them to stop and can lead to infection. As pigs feel uncomfortable in their housing environment, they turn to biting and harming the tails of the pigs surrounding them. Factors that can trigger tail biting include environmental, husbandry, and diet factors like temperature, competition for food and water, vitamin E deficiency, and high fat diets.

== Industry effects ==
Tail biting is considered one of the major animal welfare problems affecting the fattening of pigs in the swine industry. This is because of the costs to treat and costs due to slower fattening to slaughter weight. There are factors to be taken into account when evaluating how tail biting affects production since they have to do with growth, feed intake, leanness and other production traits. Some of those factors are genetics, breed, gender.

== Prevention and management ==
The victim pigs of tail biting should be isolated from the others in order to prevent further damage. The tail can be dressed with a bandage and/or sprayed with an antiseptic. Broad spectrum antibiotics can be prescribed by a veterinarian to prevent and treat any infections. Meat withholding periods should be taken into account if antibiotics are prescribed.

To minimize tail biting, toys like chains, alkathene piping, and rubber boots can be provided to redirect pigs' chewing tendencies. A substrate material for the flooring of the pen like feed or straw can provide additional enrichment in preventing tail biting as well. Tail docking is another way to prevent tail biting. This is done when piglets are 3–7 days old and should be done cleanly and efficiently by someone who is competent. Dietary supplements can be given to increase salt levels which has been shown to be effective. Salt levels should be monitored as to prevent excessive intake and salt poisoning. Other things that can be monitored and adjusted are potential stressors like stocking density, temperature and ventilation regulation. In regards to stocking density, there are minimum space requirements for pigs based on weight per The Welfare of Farmed Animals Regulations. Temperature and ventilation should be monitored and regulated as to prevent chilling, overheating, too much dust, gas, and ammonia buildup in turn decreasing stress induced tail biting.
