= Animal welfare in the United Kingdom =

Treatment of and laws concerning non-human animals in the UK

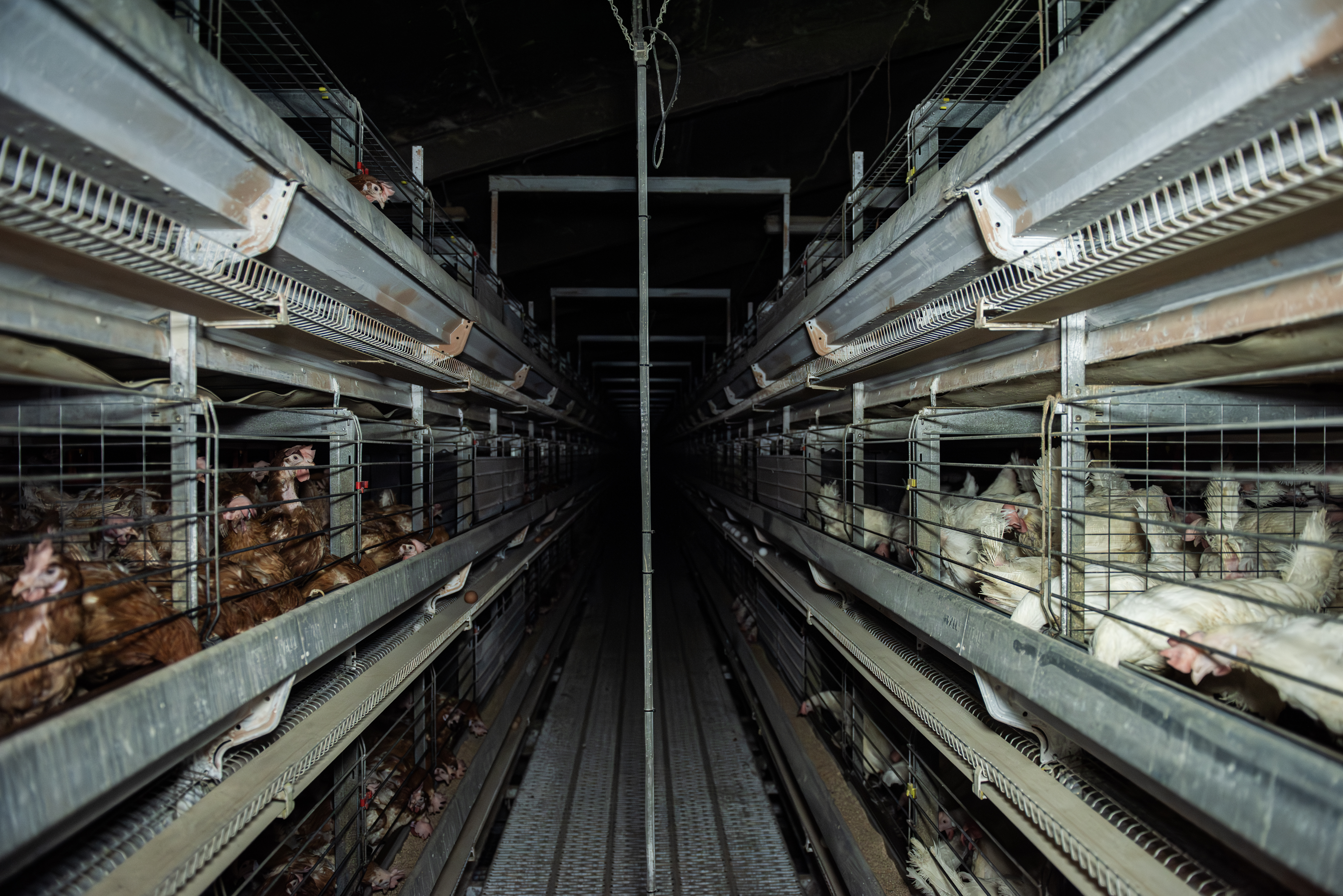
- Stacked rows of 'colony' cages - which house multiple hens per cage - inside a typical UK egg factory farm in 2020.
- Legislation: Animal Welfare Act 2006 (England); Animal Health and Welfare (Scotland) Act 2006; Welfare of Animals Act (Northern Ireland) 2011

Number of animals slaughtered annually for meat production
- Total: 1.20 billion ▲ (2023)
- Per capita: 17.42 ▲ (2023)

Proportion of population that does not eat meat
- Vegetarian: 6% ▲ (2025)
- Vegan: 3% ▲ (2025)

Animal welfare in the United Kingdom relates to the treatment of animals in fields such as agriculture, hunting, medical testing and the domestic ownership of animals. It is distinct from animal conservation.

In 2025, around 7% of the population, or about 6.25 million people, said that they do not eat fish or meat. According to research by the RSPCA, seven in 10 children in 2024 owned a pet (71%), as did half the adult population (52%). In 2025, a majority of British people, or 71%, described themselves as animal lovers.

== Laws ==
The Animal Welfare Act 2006 (c. 45) is the latest animal welfare legislation in England and Wales. It superseded and consolidated more than 20 other pieces of legislation, such as the Protection of Animals Act 1934 and the Abandonment of Animals Act 1960.

The 2006 Act introduced tougher penalties for neglect and cruelty, including fines of up to £20,000, a maximum jail term of 51 weeks and a lifetime ban on some owners keeping pets. Enforcers of the act such as the police or local authority inspectors (but not organisations such as the RSPCA) have more powers to intervene if they suspect a pet is being neglected. The act also introduced a welfare offence for the first time. This places a duty of care on pet owners to provide for their animals' basic needs, such as adequate food and water, veterinary treatment and an appropriate environment in which to live. Previously the duty of care had only existed for farm animals.

Animal welfare laws are enforced by local authorities. A 2024 report by The Animal Law Foundation found there to be one local authority inspector for every 878 farms in England, Scotland and Wales and that in 2022 and 2023, 2.5% of the more than 300,000 UK farms were inspected at least once.

The minimum age for buying a pet, or winning one as a prize, is 16 without parental accompaniment. In Scotland, the Animal Health and Welfare (Scotland) Act 2006 bans giving animals as prizes altogether.

The docking (cutting or removal) of animals' tails for cosmetic reasons is illegal in the UK, with the exception of working dogs such as those in the police and armed forces.

The Animal Welfare (Sentience) Act 2022, which came into effect in 2023, recognises animal sentience in law for the first time.

Hare coursing has been illegal in Scotland since 2002 with the passing of the Protection of Wild Mammals (Scotland) Act 2002 and in the rest of the United Kingdom since 2004, with the passing of the Hunting Act 2004. Badger culling is a controversial legal method to try to control the spread of bovine tuberculosis in the United Kingdom.

The Animal Welfare Committee is an independent advisory body established by the Government of the United Kingdom in 2011. Since 2020 the Scottish Animal Welfare Commission has advised the Scottish government on the impact of government policy and legislation on animal welfare.

In December 2025, the Department for Environment, Food and Rural Affairs released the government's updated animal welfare strategy for England. It included a ban on trail hunting, snare traps, and puppy farming, a phaseout of farrowing crates for pigs and colony cages for egg-laying hens, and new humane slaughter standards for pigs and fish.

=== Sentencing for animal cruelty ===
The previous maximum jail term of 51 weeks in prison for animal neglect and cruelty was criticised as being too lenient. In 2013, Adrian Sanders, a Liberal Democrat politician, argued for sentences to be doubled to two years in prison.

In practice, the previous maximum jail term of 51 weeks was often not applied. Tried in magistrates courts, animal cruelty cases are considered summary offences, with magistrates' courts only permitted to sentence people to a maximum of six months jail time.

In Northern Ireland in 2016, animal-welfare-related amendments to the Justice (No.2) Bill were passed by the Northern Ireland Assembly. As of April 2016, the Bill is awaiting royal assent. The amendments gave Northern Ireland the toughest penalties for animal cruelty anywhere in the UK or Ireland. The maximum sentence available for cases heard in Magistrates Courts increased from six to twelve months in 2016. The maximum fine has risen from £5,000 to £20,000. In Crown Courts, where more serious cases are heard, the maximum sentence for animal cruelty has increased from two to five years.

A new Animal Welfare (Sentencing) Bill which enables tougher prison sentences of up to five years, received Royal Assent on 29 April 2021 and came into force on 29 June 2021.

Analysis undertaken by the Sentencing Council in 2023 showed that between 2011 and 2021, sentences for causing unnecessary suffering to animals fell from 993 in 2011 to 336 in 2021. The decrease in volume should be interpreted in the context of the COVID-19 pandemic in the United Kingdom which resulted in a lockdown in March 2020.

== Farming ==
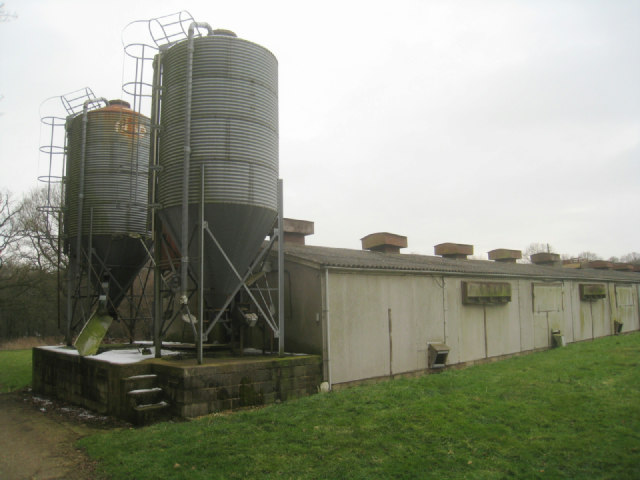
Intensive farming in the United Kingdom.

In post-war Britain, agriculture is increasingly concentrated in bigger farms with more livestock, known as intensive farming. The number of intensive farms in England has increased by 77% from 709 farms in 2010 to 1,258 farms in 2017 to meet the increasing demand in food. As of 2023 there were 1,824 intensive farms in the UK.

There has been a considerable reduction in the number of abattoirs in the UK, from about 2,500 in the 1970s to 203 by 2023. This reduction in numbers has animal welfare implications due to time in transport for animals. Halal and kosher slaughter are religiously prescribed ways of acceptable slaughter which are controversial because of animal welfare implications.

=== Chicken ===
Intensive poultry units (IPU) in Shropshire house about 23 million industrially farmed chickens at any given time, one of the densest concentrations of IPUs in Europe. Campaigners contend the waste from IPUs has impacted the River Wye badly with welfare implications for fish in the river.

Beak trimming of chicks is legal in the United Kingdom, as a method to reduce injurious feather pecking, although the current DEFRA code of practice states that routine beak trimming should be stopped as soon as possible. Chick culling is legal in the United Kingdom, and is most commonly done using argon gas to asphyxiate chicks although chick maceration is legal but not as common. In 2022 it was estimated that 29 million male day old chicks were killed annually.

The RSPCA maintains that "ninety per cent of all supermarket chickens in the UK are a fast-growing breed, genetically selected for their rapid growth rate", referred to as "Frankenchickens". According to animal welfare expert Kate Parkes, they "live short, brutal lives with serious health and welfare issues which could so easily be avoided". In 2024, the global fast food franchise KFC has had to drop it's pledge of sourcing higher welfare, slower-growing breeds by 2026.

=== Cattle ===
The disbudding or dehorning of dairy calves is common practice in the United Kingdom. In England, it was made illegal under The Protection of Animals (Anaesthetics) Act 1954, as amended, to disbud calves or dehorn any cattle without the use of an anaesthetic other than when chemical cauterisation is used. Chemical cauterisation may only be used during the first week of life. Research from 2013 on farmers' attitudes towards farm animal welfare regulations for suckler beef cattle in Ireland showed that farmer's were ill informed and tended to disbud while calves were very young in order to avoid having to apply local anaesthetic.

=== Pigs ===
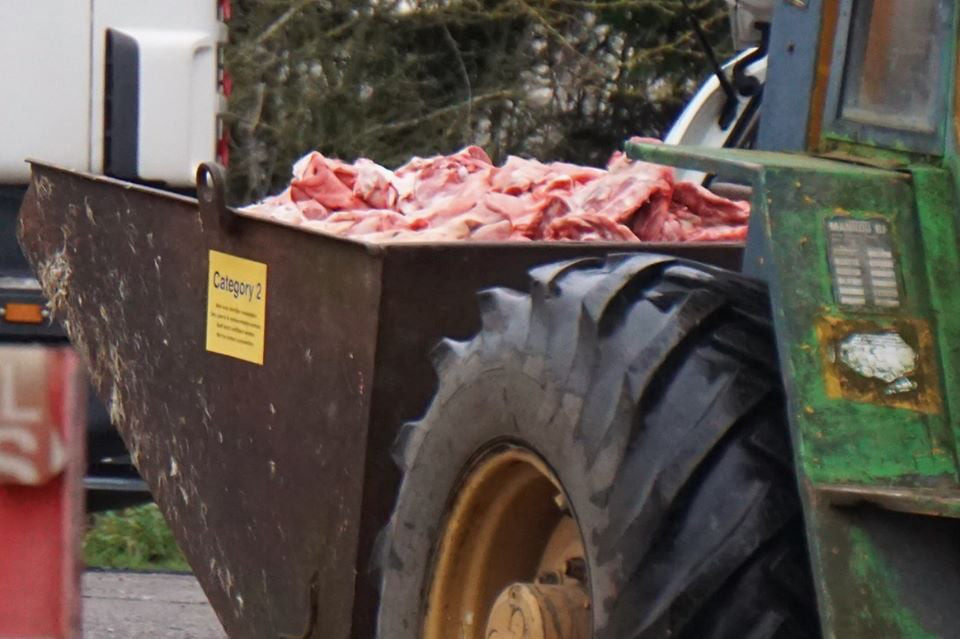
Discarded remains of pigs outside a slaughterhouse in the UK

A vast majority of pigs are bred and raised in intensive pig farms. Routine docking of piglets' tails is illegal in the UK unless approved by a veterinary surgeon, yet it is commonly done in order to try to reduce tail biting in pigs. Sow stalls or gestation crates, cages that severely restrict sows' movements during their four month pregnancy, are illegal in the United Kingdom. However, farrowing crates, practically identical cages, that sows are moved into after they give birth, in order to reduce piglet crushing are legal. The British Veterinary Association has called for farrowing crates to be phased out by 2040.

Cross Farm, in Devon, which in 2017 housed about twelve thousand pigs has been the subject of reports by Animal Equality, an international organisation, alleging violations of animal welfare law. This included pig carcasses being left in pens for several days, leading to cannibalism, pigs having untreated hernias and sows in farrowing crates biting metal bars out of frustration. In May 2025 footage from Northmoor Farm in Lincolnshire owned by one of UK's biggest pig meat producer Cranswick, which houses about six thousand pigs showed serious abuse. The footage was filmed over several weeks and showed among other things the killing of piglets by piglet thumping, whereby piglets are grabbed by their hind legs and smashed them on to the hard floor – so that they are killed by hard trauma, which is illegal. Similar abuse of pigs was recorded in a third farm that supplies Cranswick in July 2025, just days after the company had announced that piglet thumping had been banned across all its farms.

Although it is common practice in Europe and many other parts of the world to castrate piglets in order to avoid boar taint and reduce aggression in pigs, it is rarely done in the UK, because pigs are generally slaughtered before they have reached puberty. A 2005 survey of 54 pig farmers in England found them to view animal welfare as very important and acknowledged government regulation as the right mechanism to enforce it. Finally, UK pigs are predominantly stunned using CO_{2} gas chambers. This method of stunning is controversial because the high concentration of CO_{2} is aversive to pigs before stunning takes effect. Other gas mixtures do not cause pigs to squeal or flail and may thus be more appropriate, though they do take longer to take full effect.

=== Lamb ===
Tail docking in lambs is done by banding, using rubber rings, to prevent myiasis (fly strike). Castration is also done by banding using rubber rings, it is illegal to do either if the lamb is more than a week old. Castration and tail docking by banding is very painful. So much that the Animal Welfare Committee has advised that these methods can not be justified and should be abolished by 2028.

== Animal testing ==
The Animals (Scientific Procedures) Act 1986 (ASPA) regulates the conditions under which animal testing can occur in the UK. The UK government that took power in 2024 pledged to stop animal testing for some major safety tests by the end of 2025 and reducing the use of dogs and non-human primates in tests for human medicines by at least 35% by 2030.

Those applying for a licence must explain why such research cannot be done through in vitro (non-animal) methods. All research projects must pass an ethical review panel set by the Home Office, which aims to decide if the potential benefits outweigh any suffering for the animals involved.

Primates, cats, dogs, and horses have additional protection over other vertebrates included in the Act. Revised legislation came into force in January 2013. This has been expanded to protect "all living vertebrates, other than man, and any living cephalopod. Fish and amphibia are protected once they can feed independently and cephalopods at the point when they hatch. Embryonic and foetal forms of mammals, birds and reptiles are protected during the last third of their gestation or incubation period."

The definition of regulated procedures was also expanded: "A procedure is regulated if it is carried out on a protected animal and may cause that animal a level of pain, suffering, distress or lasting harm equivalent to, or higher than, that caused by inserting a hypodermic needle according to good veterinary practice." It also includes modifying the genes of a protected animal if this causes the animal pain, suffering, distress, or lasting harm. The ASPA also considers other issues such as animal sources, housing conditions, identification methods, and the humane killing of animals.

== Dog fighting ==
Dog fighting in the UK is banned by the Protection of Animals Act 1911, which was specific in outlawing "the fighting or baiting of animals." However, it was estimated in 2015 that a dog fight took place every day in the UK. Fighting dogs are pitted against each other for "profit and reputational gain". Dog fighting can cause "torn flesh, blood loss, disembowelment or even death" of the dogs involved. Stolen pets, such as smaller dogs and cats are used as "bait" to train canines for fights, which can last for up to five hours.

Traditionally dog fighting was hidden away in rural areas, but is believed to be prevalent in urban areas as well. It is often related to gang activity.

== International comparison ==
In 2020, the United Kingdom received a B out of possible grades A–G on World Animal Protection's Animal Protection Index. The UK scores relatively high (B) on protecting pets and zoo animals, and low (D) for animals used in farming or recreational purposes (e.g. horse/greyhound racing).

Many UK animal welfare standards do not apply to imported products, including prohibitions on the production of foie gras and fur. An April 2025 report by Animal Policy International, Compassion in World Farming, and the RSPCA found that 84 of 88 UK agricultural trade partners practice lower animal welfare standards than permitted under UK law. The report stated that by permitting lower-welfare imports, the UK "is effectively outsourcing animal cruelty".

== See also ==
- Category:Animal welfare organisations based in the United Kingdom
- Timeline of animal welfare and rights in Europe
- Assured Food Standards (Red Tractor)
- Farm assurance in Scotland
