= Specialist reporting agency =

A specialist reporting agency is an organisation other than the Police Service of Scotland who report alleged crimes to the Procurators Fiscal in Scotland. These include HM Revenue and Customs, Health and Safety Executive, the Scottish Environment Protection Agency, the Maritime and Coastguard Agency and Trading Standards departments of local authorities.
