= Council Regulation (EC) No 1/2005 =

2004 European Council legislation

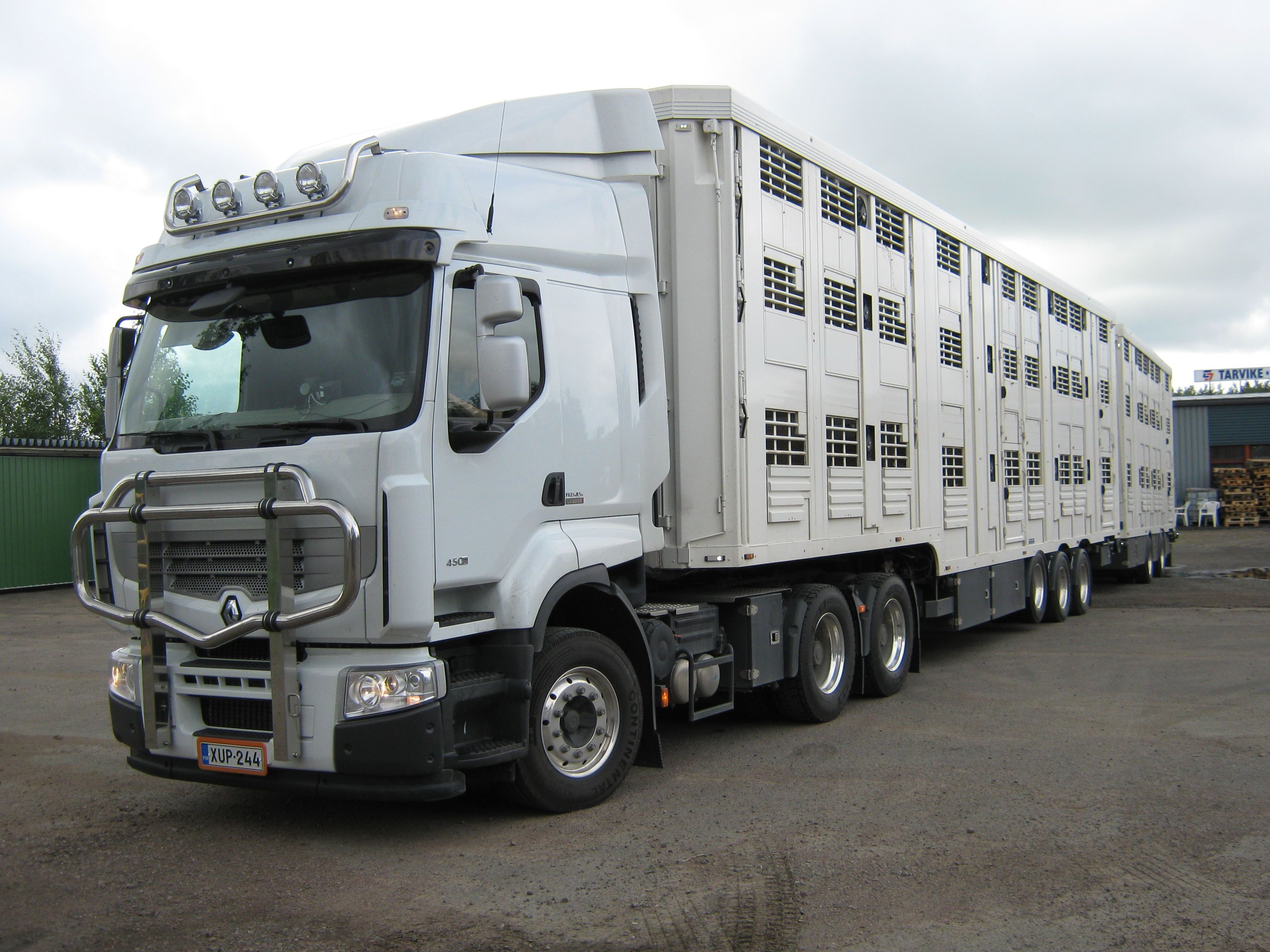
A modern-day livestock transporter

Council Regulation (EC) No 1/2005 is European Council legislation introduced in 2004 which relates to protecting the welfare of animals during transportation. The full title is Council Regulation (EC) No 1/2005 of 22 December 2004 on the protection of animals during transport and related operations and amending Directives 64/432/EEC and 93/119/EC and Regulation (EC) No 1255/97. It applies to the transport of live vertebrate animals carried out within the European Community.

Among the general conditions of transportation, it is stipulated that:

- "The animals are fit for the journey."
- "The personnel handling animals are trained or competent as appropriate for this purpose and carry out their tasks without using violence or any method likely to cause unnecessary fear, injury or suffering."
- "Water, feed and rest are offered to the animals at suitable intervals and are appropriate in quality and quantity to their species and size."

The regulation gives stricter rules for journeys longer than 8 hours, upgrading of vehicle standards and more efficient monitoring than previously.
