= Zimbabwe Society for the Prevention of Cruelty to Animals =

Zimbabwe Society for the Prevention of Cruelty to Animals (usually referred to as the ZNSPCA) is a non-profit organization dedicated to preventing the abuse of animals.

Animal welfare in Southern Rhodesia was initiated over 80 years ago, some 100 years after the Society for the Prevention of Cruelty to Animals was launched in the United Kingdom in 1824. This followed the first anti-cruelty bill which was introduced by Richard Martin MP which provided protection for cattle, horses and sheep.

The first prosecutions date back to 1832 when 181 convictions were recorded.

In 1840 the Society's work was held in such high regard by Queen Victoria that she granted her permission for the SPCA to be entitled the Royal Society for the Prevention of Cruelty to Animals.

At that time, only a single inspector had been appointed in London. By 1842, several requests had been received from other areas for the appointment of additional Inspectors.

The first SPCA Centre to be officially registered as a Welfare Organisation in Rhodesia was Bulawayo in 1967, followed by Kwekwe, Salisbury and Masvingo in the same year, Mutare in 1968 and Gweru in 1969. The smaller centres followed suit in the early 1970s.

The National Society for the Prevention of Cruelty to Animals was established in 1969 by Messrs Barrow, Hearsh, Morris, Brierley, Bott, Sobey and Howell, who represented the eight SPCA Centres providing services to animals in Zimbabwe at that time.

Over 30 years later, founder member Mr G B Howell, who retired as Chairman of the Mutare SPCA in 2002, is still an active and most respected member of the Society.

There are currently 15 active SPCA centers or divisions of ZNSPCA throughout Zimbabwe, with the recent important addition of Beitbridge.

In 2000, the National Executive Council, which represents all SPCA centers, appointed a National Co-ordinator, Chief Inspector Meryl Harrison to provide liaison between the centers, advise members on correct policy and procedure and most importantly, to provide training to Inspectors for appointment by the Minister of Tourism and the Environment, empowered to enforce the Prevention of Cruelty to Animals Act, the primary objective of the Society.

With only 10 Inspectors currently employed throughout Zimbabwe, the training of Inspectors remains the Chief Inspector's priority. Four trainees who recently completed their training and passed the Inspector's examination with excellent results are awaiting accreditation by the Minister. Three further trainees are currently undergoing their practical training. The ZNSPCA is always on the look-out for suitable individuals with the necessary level of dedication and commitment to animal welfare.

As the only organisation authorised to rescue the thousands of animals abandoned or affected by ongoing land reforms, the brave and determined Inspectors of ZNSPCA have been a credit to the Society and have received international commendations and awards for their bravery. The ZNSPCA's work has been documented in Innocent Victims by Catherine Buckle.

Apart from the rescue work which currently takes up most of the National team's time, Chief Inspector Harrison still manages to find time to deal with the myriad other animal welfare concerns of the Society, such as live animal transportation, intensive farming, wildlife in captivity, improving the conditions of laboratory animals, the introduction of codes of practice for livestock producers, export and translocation of wild animals and ensuring the humane treatment of regulated problem animals. She routinely consults with all the stake-holders connected with these activities and has established the Animal Welfare Forum, a tri-partite group comprising the Chief Inspector of the ZNSPCA, Chief Government Veterinarian and Chairman of the Veterinary Council of Zimbabwe. She retired in 2004.

Through the work of the Inspectorate, the Society in Zimbabwe is no longer perceived as an organisation merely concerned with the welfare of 'cats and dogs', but an organisation committed to the prevention of cruelty to animals in all of its manifestations.

As there are not many records available relating to the history of the Society in Zimbabwe, we would appreciate any information, files, newspaper cuttings or correspondence from former Chairmen and Inspectors in order to provide a more detailed and interesting history of the Society.

In recent years, a number of high-profile journalists such as Zimbabwean Catherine Buckle and South African Jani Allan have published columns on animal cruelty in Zimbabwe.
