= Animal Health and Welfare (Scotland) Act 2006 =

Act of the Scottish Parliament

Animal Health and Welfare (Scotland) Act 2006 (Note: Section 55(4).)
- Act of the Scottish Parliament
- Scottish Parliament
- Long title: An Act of the Scottish Parliament to amend the Animal Health Act 1981, including by making provision for preventing the spread of disease; to make provision for the welfare of animals, including for prevention of harm; and for connected purposes.
- Citation: 2006 asp 11
- Territorial extent: Scotland

Dates
- Royal assent: 11 July 2006

Other legislation
- Amends: Protection of Animals (Scotland) Act 1912; Animal Health Act 1981
- Amended by: Animals and Wildlife (Penalties, Protections and Powers) (Scotland) Act 2020
- Relates to: Animal Welfare Act 2006; Welfare of Animals Act (Northern Ireland) 2011

Status: Amended

Text of statute as originally enacted

Revised text of statute as amended

Text of the Animal Health and Welfare (Scotland) Act 2006 as in force today (including any amendments) within the United Kingdom, from legislation.gov.uk.

The Animal Health and Welfare (Scotland) Act 2006 (asp 11) is an act of the Scottish Parliament. It received royal assent on 11 July 2006.

The act consolidated, repealed and replaced many other pieces of legislation, such as the Protection of Animals Act 1934 and the Abandonment of Animals Act 1960.

== Provisions ==
The act bans tail docking of dogs. It exempts the docking of lambs' or pigs' tails, ear tagging and the castration of farm animals. The issue has caused controversy. The act also provided for increased slaughter powers in order to combat disease.

It also bans the act of removing the scent glands from skunks.

== Section 55 – Commencement ==
The following commencement orders have been made in relation to this act:

- Animal Health and Welfare (Scotland) Act 2006 (Commencement No. 1, Savings and Transitional Provisions) Order 2006 (SSI 2006/482)
- Animal Health and Welfare (Scotland) Act 2006 (Commencement No. 2) Order 2007 (SSI 2007/257)
- Animal Health and Welfare (Scotland) Act 2006 (Commencement No. 3 and Saving Provisions) Order 2020 (SSI 2020/464)

== Related legislation ==
The corresponding act for England and Wales is the Animal Welfare Act 2006, and the corresponding act for Northern Ireland is the Welfare of Animals Act (Northern Ireland) 2011.

== See also ==
- Animal welfare in the United Kingdom
