= Irish Society for Prevention of Cruelty to Animals =

Animal welfare charity

- Formation: May 1949; 77 years ago
- Type: NPO
- VAT ID no.: 460571
- Registration no.: CHY 5619
- Legal status: Charity
- Purpose: To prevent cruelty to animals, promote animal welfare and to proactively relieve animal suffering in Ireland
- Headquarters: ISPCA National Animal Centre
- Location: Keenagh, County Longford
- Coordinates: 53°37′33.5″N 7°53′15.5″W
- Website: www.ispca.ie

The Irish Society for Prevention of Cruelty to Animals (Irish: Cumann na hÉireann um Fhóirithint ar Ainmhithe), most commonly known as and referred to as the ISPCA, is a charity operating in the Republic of Ireland which promotes animal welfare. Founded in 1949, it is the main animal protection charity in Ireland known for their charitable work amongst the animal world. The ISPCA's main role is to prevent cruelty to animals, to promote animal welfare and to relieve animal suffering in Ireland. The ISPCA believes that animals "have the right to live their lives free from needless suffering". The organisation's aims include the goal to "rescue, rehabilitate and responsibly re-home" any animals which have been neglected or treated cruely.
