= List of Scottish statutory instruments, 2006 =

This is a complete list of Scottish statutory instruments in 2006.

== 1-100 ==
- Public Contracts (Scotland) Regulations 2006 (S.S.I. 2006/1)
- Utilities Contracts (Scotland) Regulations 2006 (S.S.I. 2006/2)
- Food Hygiene (Scotland) Regulations 2006 (S.S.I. 2006/3)
- Older Cattle (Disposal) (Scotland) Regulations 2006 (S.S.I. 2006/4)
- Prisons and Young Offenders Institutions (Scotland) Amendment Rules 2006 (S.S.I. 2006/5)
- Food Protection (Emergency Prohibitions) (Amnesic Shellfish Poisoning) (West Coast) (No. 12) (Scotland) Order 2005 Revocation Order 2006 (S.S.I. 2006/6)
- Bail Conditions (Methods of Monitoring Compliance and Specification of Devices) (Scotland) Regulations 2006 (S.S.I. 2006/7)
- Restriction of Liberty Order (Scotland) Regulations 2006 (S.S.I. 2006/8)
- Mental Health (Recall or Variation of Removal Order) (Scotland) Regulations 2006 (S.S.I. 2006/11)
- Mental Health (Form of Documents) (Scotland) Regulations 2006 (S.S.I. 2006/12)
- Housing (Scotland) Act 2006 (Commencement No. 1) Order 2006 (S.S.I. 2006/14)
- Intensive Support and Monitoring (Scotland) Regulations 2006 (S.S.I. 2006/15)
- Feeding Stuffs (Scotland) Amendment and the Feeding Stuffs (Sampling and Analysis) Amendment (Scotland) Regulations 2006 (S.S.I. 2006/16)
- Highland Council (Raasay) Harbour Revision Order 2006 (S.S.I. 2006/17)
- Electricity (Applications for Consent) Amendment (Scotland) Regulations 2006 (S.S.I. 2006/18)
- Environmental Assessment (Scotland) Act 2005 (Commencement and Savings) Order 2006 (S.S.I. 2006/19)
- Crofting Counties Agricultural Grants (Scotland) Scheme 2006 (S.S.I. 2006/24)
- Ethical Standards in Public Life etc. (Scotland) Act 2000 (Codes of Conduct for Members of certain Scottish Public Authorities) Order 2006 (S.S.I. 2006/26)
- Potatoes Originating in Egypt (Scotland) Amendment Regulations 2006 (S.S.I. 2006/27)
- Private Landlord Registration (Information and Fees) (Scotland) Amendment Regulations 2006 (S.S.I. 2006/28)
- Local Government Finance (Scotland) Order 2006 S.S.I 2006/29)
- Primary Medical Services (Scotland) Act 2004 (Modification of the National Health Service (Scotland) Act 1978) Order 2006 (S.S.I. 2006/30)
- Gaelic Language (Scotland) Act 2005 Commencement Order 2006 S.S.I 2006/31)
- National Health Service (Constitution of Health Boards) (Scotland) Amendment Order 2006 (S.S.I. 2006/32)
- National Health Service (Variation of the Areas of Greater Glasgow and Highland Health Boards) (Scotland) Order 2006 (S.S.I. 2006/33)
- Food Protection (Emergency Prohibitions) (Paralytic Shellfish Poisoning) (Orkney) (No. 2) (Scotland) Order 2005 Revocation Order 2006 (S.S.I. 2006/38)
- Police Grant (Variation) (Scotland) Order 2006 (S.S.I. 2006/39)
- Water Services etc. (Scotland) Act 2005 (Commencement No. 2) Order 2006 (S.S.I. 2006/40)
- Food Protection (Emergency Prohibitions) (Amnesic Shellfish Poisoning) (West Coast) (No. 15) (Scotland) Order 2005 Revocation Order 2006 (S.S.I. 2006/41)
- National Health Service (General Ophthalmic Services) (Scotland) Amendment Regulations 2006 (S.S.I. 2006/42)
- Civic Government (Scotland) Act 1982 (Licensing of Skin Piercing and Tattooing) Order 2006 (S.S.I. 2006/43)
- Foot-and-Mouth Disease (Scotland) Order 2006 (S.S.I. 2006/44)
- Foot-and-Mouth Disease (Slaughter and Vaccination) (Scotland) Regulations 2006 (S.S.I. 2006/45)
- TSE (Scotland) Amendment Regulations 2006 (S.S.I. 2006/46)
- Smoking, Health and Social Care (Scotland) Act 2005 (Commencement No. 3) Order 2006 (S.S.I. 2006/47)
- Management of Offenders etc. (Scotland) Act 2005 (Commencement No. 1) Order 2006 (S.S.I. 2006/48)
- Perth (Pilotage Powers) Order 2006 (S.S.I. 2006/49)
- Police Act 1997 Amendment (Scotland) Order 2006 (S.S.I. 2006/50)
- Sea Fish (Prohibited Methods of Fishing) (Firth of Clyde) Order 2006 (S.S.I. 2006/51)
- Food Protection (Emergency Prohibitions) (Radioactivity in Sheep) Partial Revocation (Scotland) Order 2006 (S.S.I. 2006/52)
- Water Environment and Water Services (Scotland) Act 2003 (Commencement No. 4) Order 2006 (S.S.I. 2006/55)
- Budget (Scotland) Act 2005 Amendment Order 2006 (S.S.I. 2006/56)
- Solway Firth Regulated Fishery (Scotland) Order 2006 S.SI. 2006/57)
- Inshore Fishing (Prohibition of Fishing for Cockles) (Scotland) Order 2006 (S.S.I. 2006/58)
- Vulnerable Witnesses (Scotland) Act 2004 (Commencement No. 3, Savings and Transitional Provisions) Order 2006 (S.S.I. 2006/59)
- Advice and Assistance (Scotland) Amendment Regulations 2006 (S.S.I. 2006/60)
- Civil Legal Aid (Scotland) Amendment Regulations 2006 (S.S.I. 2006/61)
- Management of Offenders etc. (Scotland) Act 2005 (Designation of Partner Bodies) Order 2006 S.S.I 2006/63)
- Housing Revenue Account General Fund Contribution Limits (Scotland) Order 2006 (S.S.I. 2006/64)
- Food Protection (Emergency Prohibitions) (Amnesic Shellfish Poisoning) (West Coast) (No. 17) (Scotland) Order 2005 Revocation Order 2006 (S.S.I. 2006/66)
- Council Tax (Electronic Communications) (Scotland) Order 2006 (S.S.I. 2006/67)
- Food Protection (Emergency Prohibitions) (Amnesic Shellfish Poisoning) (West Coast) (No. 6) (Scotland) Order 2005 Revocation Order 2006 (S.S.I. 2006/69)
- Seeds (Fees) (Scotland) Amendment Regulations 2006 (S.S.I. 2006/70)
- Water Services Charges (Billing and Collection) (Scotland) Order 2006 (S.S.I. 2006/71)
- Water and Sewerage Charges (Exemption and Reduction) (Scotland) Regulations 2006 (S.S.I. 2006/72)
- Sheep and Goats (Identification and Traceability) (Scotland) Regulations 2006 (S.S.I. 2006/73)
- Charities and Trustee Investment (Scotland) Act 2005 (Commencement No. 2) Order 2006 (S.S.I. 2006/74)
- Act of Sederunt (Child Care and Maintenance Rules) Amendment (Vulnerable Witnesses (Scotland) Act 2004) 2006 (S.S.I. 2006/75)
- Act of Adjournal (Criminal Procedure Rules Amendment) (Vulnerable Witnesses (Scotland) Act 2004) 2006 (S.S.I. 2006/76)
- NHS Education for Scotland Amendment Order 2006 (S.S.I. 2006/79)
- Older Cattle (Disposal) (Scotland) Amendment Regulations 2006 82)
- Act of Sederunt (Rules of the Court of Session Amendment) (Miscellaneous) 2006 (S.S.I. 2006/83)
- Road Traffic (NHS Charges) Amendment (Scotland) Regulations 2006 (S.S.I. 2006/84)
- Criminal Justice (Scotland) Act 2003 (Commencement No. 7) Order 2006 (S.S.I. 2006/85)
- Act of Sederunt (Fees of Shorthand Writers in the Sheriff Court) (Amendment) 2006 (S.S.I. 2006/86)
- Act of Sederunt (Rules of the Court of Session Amendment No.2 ) (Fees of Shorthand Writers) 2006 (S.S.I. 2006/87)
- Additional Support Needs Tribunals for Scotland (Practice and Procedure) Rules 2006 (S.S.I. 2006/88)
- Local Government in Scotland Act 2003 (Commencement No. 3) Order 2006 (S.S.I. 2006/89)
- Prohibition of Smoking in Certain Premises (Scotland) Regulations 2006 (S.S.I. 2006/90)
- Police Grant (Scotland) Order 2006 (S.S.I. 2006/91)
- Non-Domestic Rate (Scotland) Order 2006 (S.S.I. 2006/92)
- Prisons and Young Offenders Institutions (Scotland) Rules 2006 (S.S.I. 2006/94)
- Smoking, Health and Social Care (Scotland) Act 2005 (Consequential Amendments) Order 2006 (S.S.I. 2006/95)
- Police Act 1997 (Criminal Records) (Scotland) Regulations 2006 (S.S.I. 2006/96)
- Police Act 1997 (Criminal Records) (Registration) (Scotland) Regulations 2006 (S.S.I. 2006/97)

== 101-200 ==
- Planning and Compulsory Purchase Act 2004 (Commencement No. 1) (Scotland) Order 2006 (S.S.I. 2006/101)
- Food Protection (Emergency Prohibitions) (Amnesic Shellfish Poisoning) (East Coast) (Scotland) Order 2005 Revocation Order 2006 (S.S.I. 2006/102)
- Food Protection (Emergency Prohibitions) (Amnesic Shellfish Poisoning) (West Coast) (No. 14) (Scotland) Order 2005 Partial Revocation Order 2006 (S.S.I. 2006/103)
- Antisocial Behaviour etc. (Scotland) Act 2004 (Commencement and Savings) Amendment Order 2006 (S.S.I. 2006/104)
- Fish Labelling (Scotland) Amendment Regulations 2006 (S.S.I. 2006/105)
- Transfer of Functions from the Strathclyde Passenger Transport Authority and the Strathclyde Passenger Transport Executive to the West of Scotland Transport Partnership Order 2006 (S.S.I. 2006/106)
- National Bus Travel Concession Scheme for Older and Disabled Persons (Scotland) Order 2006 (S.S.I. 2006/107)
- Title Conditions (Scotland) Act 2003 (Rural Housing Bodies) Amendment Order 2006 (S.S.I. 2006/108)
- Abolition of Feudal Tenure etc. (Scotland) Act 2000 (Specified Day) Order 2006 (S.S.I. 2006/109)
- Title Conditions (Scotland) Act 2003 (Conservation Bodies) Amendment Order 2006 (S.S.I. 2006/110)
- Transfer of Property, Rights and Liabilities from the Strathclyde Passenger Transport Authority and the Strathclyde Passenger Transport Executive to the West of Scotland Transport Partnership Order 2006 (S.S.I. 2006/111)
- Strathclyde Passenger Transport Area (Variation) Order 2006 (S.S.I. 2006/112)
- National Assistance (Assessment of Resources) Amendment (Scotland) Regulations 2006 (S.S.I. 2006/113)
- National Assistance (Sums for Personal Requirements) (Scotland) Regulations 2006 (S.S.I. 2006/114)
- Civil Partnership Family Homes (Form of Consent) (Scotland) Regulations 2006 (S.S.I. 2006/115)
- Diligence against Earnings (Variation) (Scotland) Regulations 2006 (S.S.I. 2006/116)
- National Bus Travel Concession Scheme for Older and Disabled Persons (Eligible Persons and Eligible Services) (Scotland) Order 2006 (S.S.I. 2006/117)
- Beef Carcase (Classification) (Scotland) Amendment Regulations 2006 (S.S.I. 2006/118)
- Dairy Produce Quotas (Scotland) Amendment Regulations 2006 (S.S.I. 2006/119)
- Provision of Water and Sewerage Services (Reasonable Cost) (Scotland) Regulations 2006 (S.S.I. 2006/120)
- Smoking, Health and Social Care (Scotland) Act 2005 (Commencement No. 4) Order 2006 (S.S.I. 2006/121)
- National Health Service (Tribunal) (Scotland) Amendment Regulations 2006 (S.S.I. 2006/122)
- Local Government Pension Scheme (Scotland) Amendment Regulations 2006 (S.S.I. 2006/123)
- Non Domestic Rating (Rural Areas and Rateable Value Limits) (Scotland) Amendment Order 2006 (S.S.I. 2006/125)
- Water Environment and Water Services (Scotland) Act 2003 (Designation of Responsible Authorities and Functions) Order 2006 (S.S.I. 2006/126)
- Water Environment (Consequential Provisions) (Scotland) Order 2006 (S.S.I. 2006/127)
- Waste Management Licensing (Water Environment) (Scotland) Regulations 2006 (S.S.I. 2006/128)
- Serious Organised Crime and Police Act 2005 (Consequential and Supplementary Amendments) (Scotland) Order 2006 (S.S.I. 2006/129)
- Title Conditions (Scotland) Act 2003 (Conservation Bodies) Amendment (No. 2) Order 2006 (S.S.I. 2006/130)
- National Health Service (Dental Charges) (Scotland) Amendment Regulations 2006 (S.S.I. 2006/131)
- Functions of Health Boards (Scotland) Amendment Order 2006 (S.S.I. 2006/132)
- Water Environment (Oil Storage) (Scotland) Regulations 2006 (S.S.I. 2006/133)
- Sight Testing (Examination and Prescription) Amendment (Scotland) Regulations 2006 (S.S.I. 2006/134)
- National Health Service (General Ophthalmic Services) (Scotland) Regulations 2006 (S.S.I. 2006/135)
- National Health Service (Primary Medical Services Performers Lists) (Scotland) Amendment Regulations 2006 (S.S.I. 2006/136)
- National Health Service (General Dental Services) (Scotland) Amendment Regulations 2006 (S.S.I. 2006/137)
- National Health Service (Optical Charges and Payments) (Scotland) Amendment Regulations 2006 (S.S.I. 2006/138)
- National Health Service (Service Committees and Tribunal) (Scotland) Amendment Regulations 2006 (S.S.I. 2006/139)
- Children (Protection at Work) (Scotland) Regulations 2006 (S.S.I. 2006/140)
- National Health Service (Charges to Overseas Visitors) (Scotland) Amendment Regulations 2006 (S.S.I. 2006/141)
- National Health Service (Travelling Expenses and Remission of Charges) (Scotland) Amendment Regulations 2006 (S.S.I. 2006/142)
- National Health Service (Pharmaceutical Services) (Scotland) Amendment Regulations 2006 (S.S.I. 2006/143)
- National Waiting Times Centre Board (Scotland) Amendment Order 2006 (S.S.I. 2006/144)
- Food Protection (Emergency Prohibitions) (Amnesic Shellfish Poisoning) (West Coast) (No. 16) (Scotland) Order 2005 Partial Revocation Order 2006 (S.S.I. 2006/145)
- National Health Service (Charges for Drugs and Appliances) (Scotland) Amendment Regulations 2006 (S.S.I. 2006/149)
- Pesticides (Maximum Residue Levels in Crops, Food and Feeding Stuffs) (Scotland) Amendment Regulations 2006 (S.S.I. 2006/151)
- Scottish Water (Allt an Lagain) Water Order 2006 (S.S.I. 2006/152)
- Scottish Water (Unapool Burn) Water Order 2006 (S.S.I. 2006/153)
- Gambling Act 2005 (Licensing Authority Policy Statement) (Scotland) Regulations 2006 (S.S.I. 2006/154)
- Sewerage Nuisance (Code of Practice) (Scotland) Order 2006 (S.S.I. 2006/155)
- Products of Animal Origin (Third Country Imports) (Scotland) Amendment Regulations 2006 (S.S.I. 2006/156)
- Erskine Bridge (Temporary Suspension of Tolls) Order 2006 (S.S.I. 2006/157)
- Non-Domestic Rates (Levying) (Scotland) (No. 2) Regulations 2006 (S.S.I. 2006/158)
- Budget (Scotland) Act 2005 Amendment (No. 2) Order 2006 (S.S.I. 2006/162)
- Building (Forms) (Scotland) Amendment Regulations 2006 (S.S.I. 2006/163)
- Register of Sasines (Methods of Operation) (Scotland) Regulations 2006 (S.S.I. 2006/164)
- Serious Organised Crime and Police Act 2005 (Commencement No. 2) (Scotland) Order 2006 (S.S.I. 2006/166)
- Water Services etc. (Scotland) Act 2005 (Commencement No. 3 and Savings) Order 2006 (S.S.I. 2006/167)
- Criminal Justice (Scotland) Act 2003 (Commencement No. 8) Order 2006 (S.S.I. 2006/168)
- Food Protection (Emergency Prohibitions) (Amnesic Shellfish Poisoning) (West Coast) (No. 18) (Scotland) Order 2005 Revocation Order 2006 (S.S.I. 2006/169)
- Serious Organised Crime and Police Act 2005 (Specified Persons for Financial Reporting Orders) (Scotland) Order 2006 (S.S.I. 2006/170)
- Mental Health Tribunal for Scotland (Practice and Procedure) (No. 2) Amendment Rules 2006 (S.S.I. 2006/171)
- Mental Health (Relevant Health Board for Patients Detained in Conditions of Excessive Security) (Scotland) Regulations 2006 (S.S.I. 2006/172)
- Renewables Obligation (Scotland) Order 2006 (S.S.I. 2006/173)
- Civil Legal Aid (Financial Conditions) (Scotland) Regulations 2006 (S.S.I. 2006/178)
- Advice and Assistance (Financial Conditions) (Scotland) Regulations 2006 (S.S.I. 2006/179)
- Valuation and Rating (Exempted Classes) (Scotland) Order 2006 (S.S.I. 2006/180)
- Water Environment (Consequential and Savings Provisions) (Scotland) Order 2006 (S.S.I. 2006/181)
- Community Justice Authorities (Establishment, Constitution and Proceedings) (Scotland) Order 2006 (S.S.I. 2006/182)
- National Health Service (Travelling Expenses and Remission of Charges) (Scotland) Amendment (No. 2) Regulations 2006 (S.S.I. 2006/183)
- Scottish Charity Register (Transitional) Order 2006 (S.S.I. 2006/188)
- Charities and Trustee Investment (Scotland) Act 2005 (Commencement No. 3, Transitional and Savings Provision) Order 2006 (S.S.I. 2006/189)
- Risk Assessment and Minimisation (Accreditation Scheme) (Scotland) Order 2006 (S.S.I. 2006/190)
- Food Protection (Emergency Prohibitions) (Amnesic Shellfish Poisoning) (West Coast) (No. 8) (Scotland) Order 2005 Revocation Order 2006 (S.S.I. 2006/191)
- Food Protection (Emergency Prohibitions) (Amnesic Shellfish Poisoning) (West Coast) (No. 16) (Scotland) Order 2005 Revocation Order 2006 (S.S.I. 2006/192)
- Rehabilitation of Offenders Act 1974 (Exclusions and Exceptions) (Amendment) (Scotland) Order 2006 (S.S.I. 2006/194)
- Avian Influenza (H5N1 in Wild Birds) (Scotland) Order 2006 (S.S.I. 2006/196)
- Act of Sederunt (Sheriff Court Bankruptcy Rules 1996) Amendment (UNCITRAL Model Law on Cross-Border Insolvency) 2006 (S.S.I. 2006/197)
- Act of Sederunt (Sheriff Court Caveat Rules) 2006 (S.S.I. 2006/198)
- Act of Sederunt (Rules of the Court of Session Amendment No. 2) (UNCITRAL Model Law on Cross-Border Insolvency) 2006 (S.S.I. 2006/199)
- Act of Sederunt (Sheriff Court Company Insolvency Rules 1986) Amendment (UNCITRAL Model Law on Cross-Border Insolvency) 2006 (S.S.I. 2006/200)

== 201-300 ==
- Non-Domestic Rating (Electronic Communications) (Scotland) Order 2006 (S.S.I. 2006/201)
- Food Protection (Emergency Prohibitions) (Amnesic Shellfish Poisoning) (West Coast) (No. 11) (Scotland) Order 2005 Partial Revocation Order 2006 (S.S.I. 2006/202)
- Food Protection (Emergency Prohibitions) (Amnesic Shellfish Poisoning) (West Coast) (No. 14) (Scotland) Order 2005 Revocation Order 2006 (S.S.I. 2006/203)
- Act of Adjournal (Criminal Procedure Rules Amendment No. 2) (Financial Reporting Orders) 2006 (S.S.I. 2006/205)
- Act of Sederunt (Rules of the Court of Session Amendment No. 3) (Family Law (Scotland) Act 2006) 2006 (S.S.I. 2006/206)
- Act of Sederunt (Ordinary Cause Rules) Amendment (Family Law (Scotland) Act 2006 etc.) 2006 (S.S.I. 2006/207)
- Private Water Supplies (Scotland) Regulations 2006 (S.S.I. 2006/209)
- Private Water Supplies (Grants) (Scotland) Regulations 2006 (S.S.I. 2006/210)
- Registered Social Landlords (Purposes or Objects) (Scotland) Order 2006 (S.S.I. 2006/211)
- Family Law (Scotland) Act 2006 (Commencement, Transitional Provisions and Savings) Order 2006 (S.S.I. 2006/212)
- Land Management Contracts (Menu Scheme) (Scotland) Amendment Regulations 2006 (S.S.I. 2006/213)
- Croft House Grant (Scotland) Regulations 2006 (S.S.I. 2006/214)
- Further and Higher Education (Scotland) Act 1992 Modification Order 2006 (S.S.I. 2006/216)
- Charities Accounts (Scotland) Regulations 2006 (S.S.I. 2006/218)
- Charity Test (Specified Bodies) (Scotland) Order 2006 (S.S.I. 2006/219)
- Protection of Charities Assets (Exemption) (Scotland) Order 2006 (S.S.I. 2006/220)
- Mental Health (Care and Treatment) (Scotland) Act 2003 (Transitional and Savings Provisions) Amendment Order 2006 (S.S.I. 2006/221)
- Ceramic Articles in Contact with Food (Scotland) Regulations 2006 (S.S.I. 2006/230)
- TSE (Scotland) Amendment (No. 2) Regulations 2006 (S.S.I. 2006/231)
- Standards in Scotland's Schools etc. Act 2000 (Commencement No. 8 and Savings) Order 2006 (S.S.I. 2006/232)
- Advice and Assistance (Scotland) Amendment (No. 2) Regulations 2006 (S.S.I. 2006/233)
- Criminal Legal Aid (Summary Justice Pilot Courts and Bail Conditions) (Scotland) Regulations 2006 (S.S.I. 2006/234)
- Food Protection (Emergency Prohibitions) (Amnesic Shellfish Poisoning) (West Coast) (No. 7) (Scotland) Order 2005 Revocation Order 2006 (S.S.I. 2006/235)
- Food Protection (Emergency Prohibitions) (Amnesic Shellfish Poisoning) (West Coast) (No. 13) (Scotland) Order 2005 Partial Revocation Order 2006 (S.S.I. 2006/236)
- Avian Influenza (H5N1 in Wild Birds) (Scotland) Amendment Order 2006 (S.S.I. 2006/237)
- Licensing (Scotland) Act 2005 (Commencement No. 1 and Transitional Provisions) Order 2006 (S.S.I. 2006/239)
- Plant Protection Products (Scotland) Amendment Regulations 2006 (S.S.I. 2006/241)
- Food Protection (Emergency Prohibitions) (Amnesic Shellfish Poisoning) (West Coast) (No. 13) (Scotland) Order 2005 Revocation Order 2006 (S.S.I. 2006/242)
- Planning and Compulsory Purchase Act 2004 (Commencement No. 2 and Consequential Provisions) (Scotland) Order 2006 (S.S.I. 2006/243)
- Sea Fishing (Enforcement of Community Quota and Third Country Fishing Measures) (Scotland) Order 2006 (S.S.I. 2006/244)
- National Health Service (Pharmaceutical Services) (Scotland) Amendment (No. 2) Regulations 2006 (S.S.I. 2006/245)
- National Health Service (Charges for Drugs and Appliances) (Scotland) Amendment (No. 2) Regulations 2006 (S.S.I. 2006/246)
- National Health Service (General Medical Services Contracts) (Scotland) Amendment Regulations 2006 (S.S.I. 2006/247)
- National Health Service (Primary Medical Services Section 17C Agreements) (Scotland) Amendment Regulations 2006 (S.S.I. 2006/248)
- Gaming Act (Variation of Fees) (Scotland) Order 2006 (S.S.I. 2006/249)
- Public Transport Users' Committee for Scotland Order 2006 (S.S.I. 2006/250)
- Human Tissue (Scotland) Act 2006 (Commencement) Order 2006 (S.S.I. 2006/251)
- Housing (Scotland) Act 2006 (Commencement No. 2) Order 2006 (S.S.I. 2006/252)
- Divorce (Religious Bodies) (Scotland) Regulations 2006 (S.S.I. 2006/253)
- Divorce and Dissolution etc. (Pension Protection Fund) (Scotland) Regulations 2006 (S.S.I. 2006/254)
- Parental Responsibilities and Parental Rights Agreement (Scotland) Amendment Regulations 2006 (S.S.I. 2006/255)
- Maximum Number of Part-Time Sheriffs (Scotland) Order 2006 (S.S.I. 2006/257)
- Food Protection (Emergency Prohibitions) (Amnesic Shellfish Poisoning) (West Coast) (No. 11) (Scotland) Order 2005 Revocation Order 2006 (S.S.I. 2006/260)
- Joint Inspections (Scotland) Regulations 2006 (S.S.I. 2006/263)
- Seed Potatoes (Fees) (Scotland) Amendment Regulations 2006 (S.S.I. 2006/264)
- Planning (National Security Directions and Appointed Representatives) (Scotland) Rules 2006 (S.S.I. 2006/265)
- Town and Country Planning (Listed Buildings and Buildings in Conservation Areas) (Amendment) (Scotland) Regulations 2006 (S.S.I. 2006/266)
- Planning and Compulsory Purchase Act 2004 (Commencement No. 3) (Scotland) Order 2006 (S.S.I. 2006/268)
- Planning and Compulsory Purchase Act 2004 (Transitional Provisions) (Scotland) Order 2006 (S.S.I. 2006/269)
- Town and Country Planning (Application of Subordinate Legislation to the Crown) (Scotland) Order 2006 (S.S.I. 2006/270)
- Regulation of Care (Applications and Provision of Advice) (Scotland) Amendment Order 2006 (S.S.I. 2006/272)
- Regulation of Care (Fees) (Scotland) Amendment Order 2006 (S.S.I. 2006/273)
- Regulation of Care (Requirements as to Care Services) (Scotland) Amendment Regulations 2006 (S.S.I. 2006/274)
- Regulation of Care (Scotland) Act 2001 (Commencement No. 7 and Transitional Provisions) Order 2006 (S.S.I. 2006/275)
- Robert Gordon University (Establishment) (Scotland) Order 2006 (S.S.I. 2006/276)
- Designation of Institutions of Higher Education (Scotland) Order 2006 (S.S.I. 2006/279)
- Crime (International Co-operation) Act 2003 (Commencement No. 2) (Scotland) Order 2006 (S.S.I. 2006/281)
- Sea Fishing (Marking and Identification of Passive Fishing Gear and Beam Trawls) (Scotland) Order 2006 (S.S.I. 2006/284)
- Police Pensions Amendment (Scotland) Regulations 2006 (S.S.I. 2006/285)
- Licensing (Scotland) Act 2005 (Commencement No. 2 and Transitional Provisions) Order 2006 (S.S.I. 2006/286)
- Act of Sederunt (Chancery Procedure Rules) 2006 (S.S.I. 2006/292)
- Act of Sederunt (Ordinary Cause Rules) Amendment (Causes Relating to Articles 81 and 82 of the Treaty Establishing the European Community) 2006 (S.S.I. 2006/293)
- Act of Sederunt (Rules of the Court of Session Amendment No. 4) (Fees of Solicitors) 2006 (S.S.I. 2006/294)
- Act of Sederunt (Fees of Solicitors in the Sheriff Court) (Amendment) 2006 (S.S.I. 2006/296)
- Scottish Water (Loch Braigh Horrisdale) Water Order 2006 (S.S.I. 2006/296)
- Private Water Supplies (Notices) (Scotland) Regulations 2006 (S.S.I. 2006/297)
- Robert Gordon University (Scotland) Order of Council 2006 (S.S.I. 2006/298)

== 301-400 ==
- Act of Adjournal (Criminal Procedure Rules Amendment No. 3) (Risk Assessment Orders and Orders for Lifelong Restriction) 2006 (S.S.I. 2006/302)
- Public Appointments and Public Bodies etc. (Scotland) Act 2003 (Treatment of Office or Body as Specified Authority) Order 2006 (S.S.I. 2006/303)
- Contaminants in Food (Scotland) Regulations 2006 (S.S.I. 2006/306)
- National Health Service (Superannuation Scheme and Additional Voluntary Contributions) (Scotland) Amendment Regulations 2006 (S.S.I. 2006/307)
- Teachers' Superannuation (Scotland) Amendment Regulations 2006 (S.S.I. 2006/308)
- Human Tissue (Specification of Posts) (Scotland) Order 2006 (S.S.I. 2006/309)
- Approval of Research on Organs No Longer Required for Procurator Fiscal Purposes (Specified Persons) (Scotland) Order 2006 (S.S.I. 2006/310)
- Common Agricultural Policy (Wine) (Scotland) Amendment Regulations 2006 (S.S.I. 2006/311)
- Pesticides (Maximum Residue Levels in Crops, Food and Feeding Stuffs) (Scotland) Amendment (No.2) Regulations 2006 (S.S.I. 2006/312)
- Seed (Registration, Licensing and Enforcement) (Scotland) Regulations 2006 (S.S.I. 2006/313)
- Plastic Materials and Articles in Contact with Food (Scotland) Regulations 2006 (S.S.I. 2006/314)
- Home Detention Curfew Licence (Prescribed Standard Conditions) (Scotland) Order 2006 (S.S.I. 2006/315)
- Education (Student Loans) Amendment (Scotland) Regulations 2006 (S.S.I. 2006/316)
- Education (Assisted Places) (Scotland) Amendment Regulations 2006 (S.S.I. 2006/317)
- St Mary's Music School (Aided Places) (Scotland) Amendment Regulations 2006 (S.S.I. 2006/318)
- Plant Health (Potatoes) (Scotland) Order 2006 (S.S.I. 2006/319)
- National Health Service (Pharmaceutical Services) (Scotland) Amendment (No. 3) Regulations 2006 (S.S.I. 2006/320)
- National Health Service (General Dental Services) (Scotland) Amendment (No. 2) Regulations 2006 (S.S.I. 2006/321)
- Education (Appeal Committee Procedures) (Scotland) Amendment Regulations 2006 (S.S.I. 2006/322)
- Education (Graduate Endowment, Student Fees and Support) (Scotland) Amendment Regulations 2006 (S.S.I. 2006/323)
- Registration of Independent Schools (Scotland) Regulations 2006 (S.S.I. 2006/324)
- Civil Legal Aid (Scotland) Amendment (No. 2) Regulations 2006 (S.S.I. 2006/325)
- Education (Student Loans for Tuition Fees) (Repayment and Allowances) (Scotland) Amendment Regulations 2006 (S.S.I. 2006/326)
- Human Tissue (Removal of Body Parts by an Authorised Person) (Scotland) Regulations 2006 (S.S.I. 2006/327)
- Anatomy (Specified Persons and Museums for Public Display) (Scotland) Order 2006 (S.S.I. 2006/328)
- National Health Service (General Ophthalmic Services) (Scotland) Amendment Regulations 2006 (S.S.I. 2006/329)
- National Health Service (Discipline Committees) (Scotland) Regulations 2006 (S.S.I. 2006/330)
- Management of Offenders etc. (Scotland) Act 2005 (Commencement No. 2) Order 2006 331)
- Criminal Justice (Scotland) Act 2003 (Commencement No. 9) Order 2006 (S.S.I. 2006/332)
- Education (Student Loans for Tuition Fees) (Scotland) Regulations 2006 (S.S.I. 2006/333)
- Anatomy (Scotland) Regulations 2006 (S.S.I. 2006/334)
- Animals and Animal Products (Import and Export) (Scotland) Amendment Regulations 2006 (S.S.I. 2006/335)
- Avian Influenza and Influenza of Avian Origin in Mammals (Scotland) Order 2006 (S.S.I. 2006/336)
- Avian Influenza (Slaughter and Vaccination) (Scotland) Regulations 2006 (S.S.I. 2006/337)
- Firefighters' Compensation Scheme (Scotland) Order 2006 (S.S.I. 2006/338)
- Town and Country Planning (Application of Subordinate Legislation to the Crown) (Inquiries Procedure) (Scotland) Order 2006 (S.S.I. 2006/339)
- Human Tissue (Scotland) Act 2006 (Anatomy Act 1984 Transitional Provisions) Order 2006 (S.S.I. 2006/340)
- Sea Fishing (Restriction on Days at Sea) (Scotland) Order 2006 (S.S.I. 2006/341)
- Firefighters' Pension Scheme Amendment (Scotland) Order 2006 (S.S.I. 2006/342)
- Adults with Incapacity (Removal of Regenerative Tissue for Transplantation) (Form of Certificate) (Scotland) Regulations 2006 (S.S.I. 2006/343)
- Human Tissue (Scotland) Act 2006 (Maintenance of Records and Supply of Information Regarding the Removal and Use of Body Parts) Regulations 2006 (S.S.I. 2006/344)
- Advice and Assistance (Assistance by Way of Representation) (Scotland) Amendment Regulations 2006 (S.S.I. 2006/345)
- Diseases of Animals (Approved Disinfectants) Amendment (Scotland) Order 2006 (S.S.I. 2006/352)
- East Lothian (Electoral Arrangements) Order 2006 (S.S.I. 2006/359)
- Scottish Water (Abhainn Dhubh) Water Order 2006 (S.S.I. 2006/360)
- Scottish Water (Tomich Boreholes) Water Order 2006 (S.S.I. 2006/361)
- Public Appointments and Public Bodies etc. (Scotland) Act 2003 (Treatment of Public Transport Users' Committee for Scotland as Specified Authority and Amendment of Specified Authorities) Order 2006 (S.S.I. 2006/363)
- Joint Inspections (Scotland) Amendment Regulations 2006 (S.S.I. 2006/365)
- Electronic Communications (Scotland) Order 2006 (S.S.I. 2006/367)
- Adults with Incapacity (Removal of Regenerative Tissue for Transplantation) (Form of Certificate) (Scotland) (No. 2) Regulations 2006 (S.S.I. 2006/368)
- Perth and Kinross (Electoral Arrangements) Order 2006 (S.S.I. 2006/370)
- Moray (Electoral Arrangements) Order 2006 (S.S.I. 2006/372)
- Inverclyde (Electoral Arrangements) Order 2006 (S.S.I. 2006/373)
- East Dunbartonshire (Electoral Arrangements) Order 2006 (S.S.I. 2006/374)
- Dundee City (Electoral Arrangements) Order 2006 (S.S.I. 2006/375)
- Stirling (Electoral Arrangements) Order 2006 (S.S.I. 2006/376)
- South Lanarkshire (Electoral Arrangements) Order 2006 (S.S.I. 2006/377)
- Argyll and Bute (Electoral Arrangements) Order 2006 (S.S.I. 2006/378)
- Civil Partnership Act 2004 (Consequential Amendments) (Scotland) Order 2006 (S.S.I. 2006/379)
- Serious Organised Crime and Police Act 2005 (Commencement No. 7) Order 2006 (S.S.I. 2006/381)
- Private Security Industry Act 2001 (Commencement No. 1) (Scotland) Order 2006 (S.S.I. 2006/382)
- Inshore Fishing (Prohibition of Fishing for Cockles) (Scotland) (No. 2) Order 2006 (S.S.I. 2006/383)
- Family Law (Scotland) Act 2006 (Consequential Modifications) Order 2006 (S.S.I. 2006/384)
- Management of Offenders etc. (Scotland) Act 2005 (Supplementary Provisions) Order 2006 (S.S.I. 2006/389)
- Human Organ and Tissue Live Transplants (Scotland) Regulations 2006 (S.S.I. 2006/390)
- East Renfrewshire (Electoral Arrangements) Order 2006 (S.S.I. 2006/391)
- Falkirk (Electoral Arrangements) Order 2006 (S.S.I. 2006/392)
- Angus (Electoral Arrangements) Order 2006 (S.S.I. 2006/393)
- Orkney Islands (Electoral Arrangements) Order 2006 (S.S.I. 2006/394)
- Housing (Scotland) Act 2006 (Commencement No. 3) Order 2006 (S.S.I. 2006/395)
- Act of Sederunt (Jurisdiction, Recognition and Enforcement of Judgments in Matrimonial Matters and Matters of Parental Responsibility Rules) 2006 (S.S.I. 2006/397)
- Designation of Institutions of Higher Education (Scotland) Amendment Order 2006 (S.S.I. 2006/398)
- Avian Influenza (Preventive Measures) (Scotland) Amendment Regulations 2006 (S.S.I. 2006/399)

== 401-500 ==
- Student Fees (Specification) (Scotland) Order 2006 (S.S.I. 2006/401)
- Council Tax (Exempt Dwellings) (Scotland) Amendment Order 2006 (S.S.I. 2006/402)
- Robert Gordon University (Scotland) Amendment Order of Council 2006 (S.S.I. 2006/404)
- Act of Sederunt (Ordinary Cause and Summary Application Rules) Amendment (Miscellaneous) 2006 (S.S.I. 2006/410)
- Act of Sederunt (Child Care and Maintenance Rules 1997) (Amendment) (Adoption and Children Act 2002) 2006 (S.S.I. 2006/411)
- Aberdeenshire (Electoral Arrangements) Order 2006 (S.S.I. 2006/416)
- Products of Animal Origin (Third Country Imports) (Scotland) Amendment (No. 2) Regulations 2006 (S.S.I. 2006/419)
- Human Tissue (Scotland) Act 2006 (Human Organ Transplants Act 1989 Transitional and Savings Provisions) Order 2006 (S.S.I. 2006/420)
- North Ayrshire (Electoral Arrangements) Order 2006 (S.S.I. 2006/427)
- East Ayrshire (Electoral Arrangements) Order 2006 (S.S.I. 2006/428)
- South Ayrshire (Electoral Arrangements) Order 2006 (S.S.I. 2006/429)
- TSE (Scotland) Amendment (No. 3) Regulations 2006 (S.S.I. 2006/430)
- Road User Charging Schemes (Keeping of Accounts and Relevant Expenses) (Scotland) Regulations 2005 Revocation Regulations 2006 S.S.I. 2006/431)
- Police, Public Order and Criminal Justice (Scotland) Act 2006 (Commencement No. 1) Order 2006 (S.S.I. 2006/432)
- Dumfries and Galloway (Electoral Arrangements) Order 2006 (S.S.I. 2006/434)
- Act of Adjournal (Criminal Procedure Rules Amendment No. 4) (Miscellaneous) 2006 (S.S.I. 2006/436)
- Act of Sederunt (Summary Applications, Statutory Applications and Appeals etc. Rules) Amendment (Miscellaneous) 2006 (S.S.I. 2006/437)
- National Health Service (Travelling Expenses and Remission of Charges) (Scotland) Amendment (No. 3) Regulations 2006 (S.S.I. 2006/440)
- Water Services etc. (Scotland) Act 2005 (Commencement No. 4) Order 2006 (S.S.I. 2006/445)
- Road Traffic (Permitted Parking Area and Special Parking Area) (City of Glasgow, Perth and Kinross Council, Aberdeen City Council, Dundee City Council and South Lanarkshire Council) Designation Amendment Order 2006 (S.S.I. 2006/446)
- Northern Salmon Fishery District Designation Order 2006 (S.S.I. 2006/447)
- Cereal Seed (Scotland) and Fodder Plant Seed (Scotland) Amendment Regulations 2006 (S.S.I. 2006/448)
- Plant Protection Products (Scotland) Amendment (No. 2) Regulations 2006 (S.S.I. 2006/449)
- Animals and Animal Products (Import and Export) (Scotland) Amendment (No. 2) Regulations 2006 (S.S.I. 2006/450)
- Pig Carcase (Grading) Amendment (Scotland) Regulations 2006 (S.S.I. 2006/451)
- Academic Awards and Distinctions (The Robert Gordon University) (Scotland) Order of Council 2006 (S.S.I. 2006/452)
- Regulation of Care (Social Service Workers) (Scotland) Amendment Order 2006 (S.S.I. 2006/453)
- Scottish Schools (Parental Involvement) Act 2006 (Commencement No. 1) Order 2006 (S.S.I. 2006/454)
- Teaching Council (Scotland) (Legal Assessor) Rules 2006 (S.S.I. 2006/455)
- Fire Safety (Scotland) Regulations 2006 (S.S.I. 2006/456)
- Fire (Scotland) Act 2005 (Consequential Modifications and Savings) (No. 2) Order 2006 (S.S.I. 2006/457)
- Fire (Scotland) Act 2005 (Commencement No. 3 and Savings) Order 2006 (S.S.I. 2006/458)
- Food (Emergency Control) (Scotland) Revocation Regulations 2006 (S.S.I. 2006/459)
- Midlothian (Electoral Arrangements) Order 2006 (S.S.I. 2006/460)
- Robert Gordon University (Transfer and Closure) (Scotland) Order 2006 (S.S.I. 2006/461)
- Water Services and Sewerage Services Licences (Scotland) Order 2006 (S.S.I. 2006/464)
- Environmental Noise (Scotland) Regulations 2006 (S.S.I. 2006/465)
- Regulation of Investigatory Powers (Prescription of Offices, Ranks and Positions) (Scotland) Amendment Order 2006 (S.S.I. 2006/466)
- Race Relations Act 1976 (Statutory Duties) (Scotland) Amendment Order 2006 (S.S.I. 2006/467)
- Local Government Pension Scheme (Scotland) Amendment (No. 2) Regulations 2006 (S.S.I. 2006/468)
- Local Electoral Administration and Registration Services (Scotland) Act 2006 (Commencement No. 1 and Transitional Provision) Order 2006 (S.S.I. 2006/469)
- Local Governance (Scotland) Act 2004 (Commencement No. 3) Order 2006 (S.S.I. 2006/470)
- Local Governance (Scotland) Act 2004 (Severance Payments) Regulations 2006 (S.S.I. 2006/471)
- Clackmannanshire (Electoral Arrangements) Order 2006 (S.S.I. 2006/472)
- Tobacco Advertising and Promotion Act 2002 (Commencement No. 10) (Scotland) Order 2006 (S.S.I. 2006/473)
- Plant Health (Scotland) Amendment Order 2006 (S.S.I. 2006/474)
- Fire (Scotland) Act 2005 (Consequential Modifications and Savings) Order 2006 (S.S.I. 2006/475)
- Fundable Bodies (Scotland) Order 2006 (S.S.I. 2006/480)
- Highland (Electoral Arrangements) Order 2006 (S.S.I. 2006/481)
- Animal Health and Welfare (Scotland) Act 2006 (Commencement No. 1, Savings and Transitional Provisions) Order 2006 (S.S.I. 2006/482)
- National Health Service Central Register (Scotland) Regulations 2006 (S.S.I. 2006/484)
- Land Registration (Scotland) Rules 2006 (S.S.I. 2006/485)
- Community Right to Buy (Definition of Excluded Land) (Scotland) Order 2006 (S.S.I. 2006/486)
- Inshore Fishing (Prohibition of Fishing for Cockles) (Scotland) (No. 3) Order 2006 (S.S.I. 2006/487)
- Assynt – Coigach Area Protection Variation Order 2006 (S.S.I. 2006/488)
- Automated Registration of Title to Land (Electronic Communications) (Scotland) Order 2006 (S.S.I. 2006/491)

== 501-600 ==
- Sea Fishing (Northern Hake Stock) (Scotland) Order 2006 (S.S.I. 2006/505)
- Act of Sederunt (Ordinary Cause, Summary Application, Summary Cause and Small Claim Rules) Amendment (Equality Act 2006 etc.) 2006 (S.S.I. 2006/509)
- Fife (Electoral Arrangements) Order 2006 (S.S.I. 2006/510)
- Aberdeen City (Electoral Arrangements) Order 2006 (S.S.I. 2006/511)
- Curd Cheese (Restriction on Placing on the Market) (Scotland) Regulations 2006 (S.S.I. 2006/512)
- Construction Contracts (Scotland) Exclusion Amendment Order 2006 (S.S.I. 2006/513)
- Local Government Pension Scheme (Scotland) Amendment (No. 3) Regulations 2006 (S.S.I. 2006/514)
- Criminal Legal Aid (Scotland) (Fees) Amendment Regulations 2006 (S.S.I. 2006/515)
- Feeding Stuffs (Scotland) Amendment Regulations 2006 (S.S.I. 2006/516)
- Plastic Materials and Articles in Contact with Food (Scotland) (No. 2) Regulations 2006 (S.S.I. 2006/517)
- Police Act 1997 (Criminal Records) (Scotland) Amendment Regulations 2006 (S.S.I. 2006/521)
- Transfer of Functions to the Shetland Transport Partnership Order 2006 (S.S.I. 2006/527)
- Regional Transport Strategies (Health Boards) (Scotland) Order 2006 (S.S.I. 2006/528)
- Transmissible Spongiform Encephalopathies (Scotland) Regulations 2006 (S.S.I. 2006/530)
- Social Work Inspections (Scotland) Regulations 2006 (S.S.I. 2006/531)
- North Lanarkshire (Electoral Arrangements) Order 2006 532)
- Scottish Borders (Electoral Arrangements) Order 2006 (S.S.I. 2006/533)
- Building (Scotland) Amendment Regulations 2006 (S.S.I. 2006/534)
- West Lothian (Electoral Arrangements) Order 2006 (S.S.I. 2006/535)
- Animal Health and Welfare (Scotland) Act 2006 (Consequential Provisions) Order 2006 (S.S.I. 2006/536)
- City of Edinburgh (Electoral Arrangements) Order 2006 (S.S.I. 2006/537)
- Transfer of Functions to the South-West of Scotland Transport Partnership Order 2006 (S.S.I. 2006/538)
- Act of Sederunt (Fees of Sheriff Officers) 2006 (S.S.I. 2006/539)
- Act of Sederunt (Fees of Messengers-at-Arms) 2006 (S.S.I. 2006/540)
- Waste Management Licensing Amendment (Scotland) Regulations 2006 (S.S.I. 2006/541)
- Rice Products (Restriction on First Placing on the Market) (Scotland) Regulations 2006 (S.S.I. 2006/542)
- EC Fertilisers (Scotland) Regulations 2006 (S.S.I. 2006/543)
- Management of Offenders etc. (Scotland) Act 2005 (Commencement No. 3) Order 2006 (S.S.I. 2006/545)
- Glasgow City (Electoral Arrangements) Order 2006 (S.S.I. 2006/546)
- West Dunbartonshire (Electoral Arrangements) Order 2006 (S.S.I. 2006/547)
- Pesticides (Maximum Residue Levels in Crops, Food and Feeding Stuffs) (Scotland) Amendment (No. 3) Regulations 2006 548)
- Regulation of Scallop Dredges (Scotland) Revocation Order 2006 (S.S.I. 2006/549)
- Renfrewshire (Electoral Arrangements) Order 2006 (S.S.I. 2006/551)
- Police (Minimum Age for Appointment) (Scotland) Regulations 2006 (S.S.I. 2006/552)
- Water Environment (Controlled Activities) (Third Party Representations etc.) (Scotland) Regulations 2006 (S.S.I. 2006/553)
- Water Environment (Relevant Enactments) Order 2006 (S.S.I. 2006/554)
- Food for Particular Nutritional Uses (Addition of Substances for Specific Nutritional Purposes) (Scotland) Amendment Regulations 2006 (S.S.I. 2006/556)
- Non-Domestic Rating (Telecommunications and Canals) (Scotland) Amendment Order 2006 (S.S.I. 2006/557)
- Na h-Eileanan an Iar (Electoral Arrangements) Order 2006 (S.S.I. 2006/558)
- Health Protection Agency (Scottish Health Functions) Order 2006 (S.S.I. 2006/559)
- National Health Service (Functions of the Common Services Agency) (Scotland) Amendment Order 2006 (S.S.I. 2006/560)
- National Health Service (Superannuation Scheme and Compensation for Premature Retirement) (Scotland) Amendment Regulations 2006 (S.S.I. 2006/561)
- Shetland Islands (Electoral Arrangements) Order 2006 (S.S.I. 2006/562)
- Register of Sasines (Application Procedure) Amendment Rules 2006 (S.S.I. 2006/568)
- Housing (Scotland) Act 2006 (Commencement No. 4) Order 2006 (S.S.I. 2006/569)
- Home Energy Efficiency Scheme (Scotland) Regulations 2006 (S.S.I. 2006/570)
- Scottish Charity Appeals Panel Rules 2006 (S.S.I. 2006/571)
- Conservation of Salmon (Collection of Statistics) (Scotland) Regulations 2006 (S.S.I. 2006/572)
- Marriage (Approval of Places) (Scotland) Amendment Regulations 2006 (S.S.I. 2006/573)
- Civil Partnership (Attestation) (Scotland) Regulations 2006 (S.S.I. 2006/574)
- Registration Services (Fees, etc.) (Scotland) Regulations 2006 (S.S.I. 2006/575)
- Plant Protection Products (Scotland) Amendment (No. 3) Regulations 2006 (S.S.I. 2006/576)
- Feeding Stuffs (Scotland) and the Feed (Hygiene and Enforcement) (Scotland) Amendment Regulations 2006 (S.S.I. 2006/578)
- Fishery Products (Official Controls Charges) (Scotland) Regulations 2006 (S.S.I. 2006/579)
- Meat (Official Controls Charges) (Scotland) Regulations 2006 (S.S.I. 2006/580)
- Farriers (Registration) Act 1975 (Commencement No. 4) (Scotland) Order 2006 (S.S.I. 2006/581)
- Environmental Impact Assessment (Agriculture) (Scotland) Regulations 2006 (S.S.I. 2006/582)
- Personal Injuries (NHS Charges) (Amounts) (Scotland) Regulations 2006 (S.S.I. 2006/588)
- Budget (Scotland) Act 2006 Amendment Order 2006 (S.S.I. 2006/589)
- Personal Injuries (NHS Charges) (General) (Scotland) Regulations 2006 (S.S.I. 2006/592)
- Personal Injuries (NHS Charges) (Reviews and Appeals) (Scotland) Regulations 2006 (S.S.I. 2006/593)
- Sheep and Goats (Identification and Traceability) (Scotland) Amendment (No. 2) Regulations 2006 (S.S.I. 2006/594)
- Registration Services (Consequential Provisions) (Scotland) Order 2006 (S.S.I. 2006/596)
- Registration Services (Attestation and Authentication) (Scotland) Regulations 2006 (S.S.I. 2006/597)
- Registration of Births, Still-births, Deaths and Marriages (Prescription of Forms and Errors) (Scotland) Regulations 2006 (S.S.I. 2006/598)
- Water Services etc. (Scotland) Act 2005 (Commencement No. 5) Order 2006 (S.S.I. 2006/599)

== 601-616 ==
- Less Favoured Area Support Scheme (Scotland) Amendment Regulations 2006 (S.S.I. 2006/601)
- Prohibition of Fishing with Multiple Trawls (No. 2) (Scotland) Amendment Order 2006 (S.S.I. 2006/602)
- National Health Service (Functions of the Common Services Agency) (Scotland) Amendment (No. 2) Order 2006 (S.S.I. 2006/603)
- Civic Government (Scotland) Act 1982 (Licensing of Skin Piercing and Tattooing) Amendment Order 2006 (S.S.I. 2006/604)
- Teachers' Superannuation (Scotland) Amendment (No. 2) Regulations 2006 (S.S.I. 2006/605)
- Welfare of Animals (Transport) (Scotland) Regulations 2006 (S.S.I. 2006/606)
- Police, Public Order and Criminal Justice (Scotland) Act 2006 (Commencement No. 2) Order 2006 (S.S.I. 2006/607)
- Bus User Complaints Tribunal Regulations Revocation Regulations 2006 (S.S.I. 2006/608)
- Local Government (Discretionary Payments And Injury Benefits) (Scotland) Amendment Regulations 2006 (S.S.I. 2006/609)
- Police (Injury Benefit) (Scotland) Regulations 2006 (S.S.I. 2006/610)
- London Olympic Games and Paralympic Games Act 2006 (Commencement) (Scotland) Order 2006 (S.S.I. 2006/611)
- Public Appointments and Public Bodies etc. (Scotland) Act 2003 (Treatment of Office or Body as Specified Authority) (Scottish Legal Complaints Commission) Order 2006 (S.S.I. 2006/612)
- Public Service Vehicles (Conduct of Drivers, Inspectors, Conductors and Passengers) Amendment (Scotland) Regulations 2006 (S.S.I. 2006/613)
- Environmental Impact Assessment (Scotland) Amendment Regulations 2006 (S.S.I. 2006/614)
- Advice and Assistance (Assistance by Way of Representation) (Scotland) Amendment (No. 2) Regulations 2006 (S.S.I. 2006/615)
- Criminal Legal Aid (Scotland) (Prescribed Proceedings) Amendment Regulations 2006 (S.S.I. 2006/616)
