= Andrew Frame =

American businessperson

- Born: 1979 (age 46–47); Henderson, Nevada
- Occupation: Entrepreneur
- Years active: 1990s-present
- Known for: Founding Ooma and Citizen
- Title: Citizen CEO

Andrew Frame (born 1979) is an American technology businessperson. He co-founded the phone app Ooma in 2004, and was CEO until 2009. In 2015, he founded the public-safety app Citizen, and is its CEO.

== Early life ==
Andrew Frame was born in Henderson, Nevada in 1979. Raised in the Las Vegas metropolitan area, Frame was 12 when he built out a basic Tandy computer using Linux. He began spending time in chatrooms learning how to hack, and by his teenage years he was writing open-source software. At the age of 15, Frame dropped out of high school and started his own company, an internet service provider. Interested in UFOs, around age 16 he managed to breach two major systems at NASA's Jet Propulsion Laboratory. Following a two-year investigation, the FBI arrested him in 1997. He was sentenced to a $25,000 fine and 100 hours of community service, in addition to showing NASA the vulnerabilities in the Jet Propulsion network.

== Career ==
=== Early years (1990s-2003) ===
Frame moved to San Jose, California at age 17, getting a job at Cisco as a systems engineer. With Cisco, he traveled around the world, establishing systems in Korea and Australia. He received two of Cisco's CCIE Certifications, becoming the youngest person to do so. He subsequently worked two years at Procket Networks, a core router startup later acquired by Cisco.

=== Ooma co-founder and CEO (2004-2009) ===
In 2004 Frame co-founded Ooma, a VoIP company based in Palo Alto, California. Ooma allows calls to be made over the internet, and unlike competitors, it initially charged a fee for hardware while calls were permanently free. With Frame as CEO, the product launched in 2007, at which point Ooma had recruited Ashton Kutcher as creative director and raised $27 million in venture funding. In 2007, BusinessWeek named Frame to its list of Tech's Best Young Entrepreneurs. While at Ooma, Frame met founders such as Shawn Fanning, Sean Parker, and Mark Zuckerberg, and subsequently spent several weeks helping the then-fledgling Facebook set up its network architecture. In the process, he received Facebook shares that became worth tens of millions of dollars. Frame resigned as Ooma CEO in 2009 and moved to Los Angeles, where he enrolled in a six-month screenwriting program with producer Joan Schekel. According to Frame, he had no intention of writing movies, but said he found "a lot of analogies between the filmmaking process and creating consumer technologies. So I just got really focused on story structure."

=== Founding Citizen (2015-2017) ===
In November 2015, Frame formed the company Sp0n, Inc. in New York City to incubate his next startup. While Sp0n CEO, he developed the idea of an app that posted geo-targeted real-time notifications of public safety information and relevant 9-1-1-call data. The community-safety app Vigilante was released in the New York App Store in October 2016, with a video of users thwarting an assault becoming viral. The video attracted the attention of Apple Inc. and the NYPD, and Apple banned the app two days after its release for violating their rule against urging customers to engage in potentially harmful activities. Frame renamed the app Citizen as a result, and shifted messaging from crime fighting to safety awareness. He also consulted with public safety experts, police, and civil rights leaders on improving the app's safety. Apple reinstated Citizen in March 2017, with the app also released for Android.

=== Citizen expansion (2017-2026) ===
After the 2017 rollout, Sequoia Capital invested $12 million in Series A funding in Citizen. Frame released the app in the San Francisco Bay Area in September 2017. By 2019, Citizen had raised $40 million, with investors such as Founders Fund, Lux Capital, and Mike Judge. By 2020, nearly 20% of New Yorkers used Citizen. The app was available in 18 U.S. cities by June 2020, and gained popularity during the protests following the murder of George Floyd, surpassing apps such as Twitter and The New York Times in downloads. In June 2020, Frame launched SafeTrace, an anonymized digital contact-tracing tool within Citizen that used Bluetooth and GPS data to give users COVID-19 contact notifications. By September 2020 it was renamed SafePass, with Los Angeles County partnering with the tool, as well as San Joaquin County.

In a 2021 series C funding round, Citizen raised an additional $50 million. Frame came under criticism in May 2021 when, via Citizen, he offered a $30,000 bounty on a person wrongly suspected of arson in the Palisades Fire. After the bounty, the LAPD cut ties with the company. In August 2021, Frame launched Citizen's monthly paid subscription service, Protect, which provides the assistance of "safety agents" to paying users. At the start of 2022, the Protect app had 100,000 users, while Citizen had 10 million users overall. As CEO, in 2022 Frame oversaw Citizen's acquisition of Harbor, a disaster preparedness app. It was Citizen's first acquisition. In January 2023, Citizen laid off several dozen employees due to an "uncertain economic environment." In November 2023, Frame testified at a New York City Council joint committee concerning the NYPD's plan to encrypt their scanner transmissions. Also in 2023, Vice released a documentary about Citizen and Frame.
