= Ring (company) =

Home security products manufacturer

Ring LLC

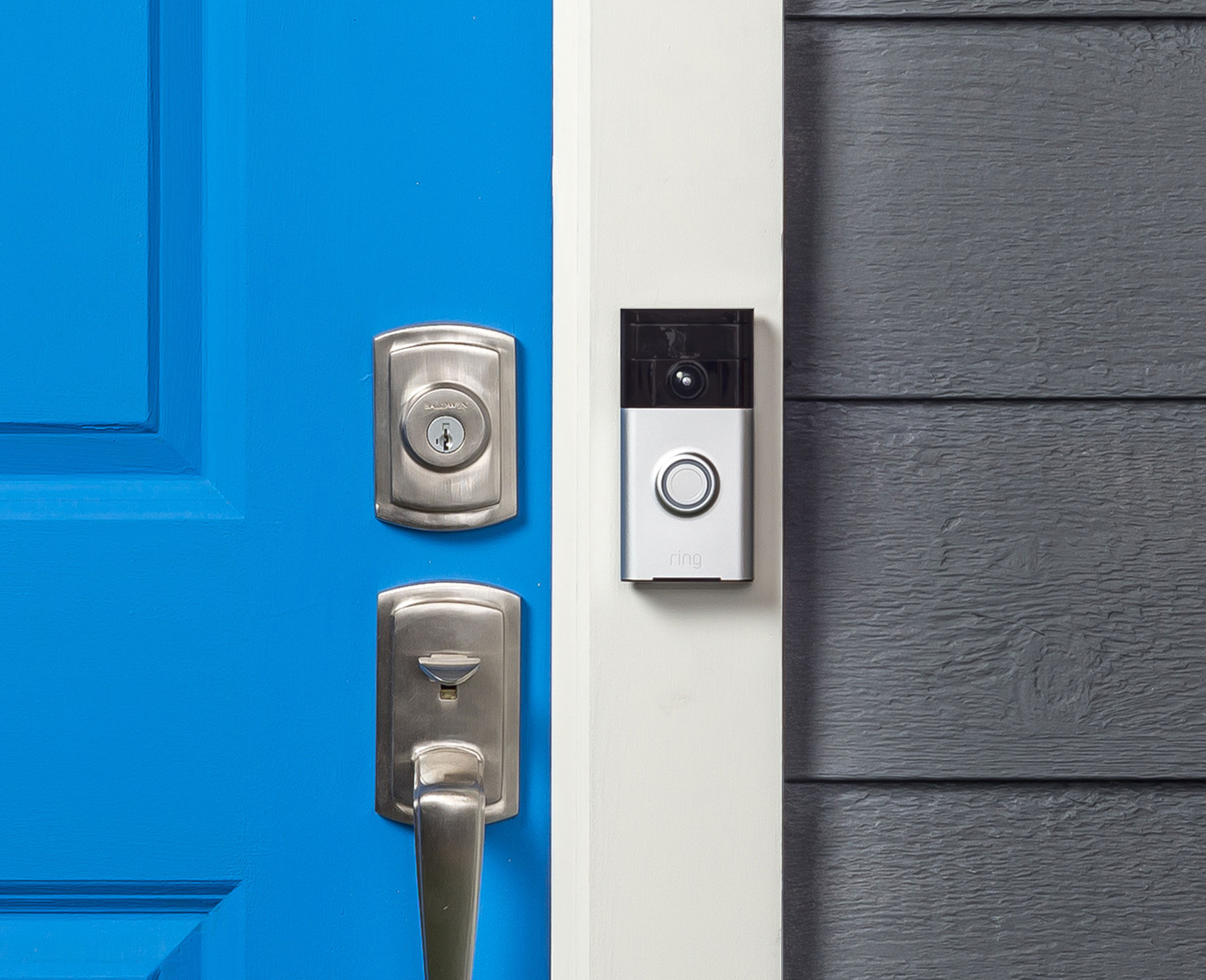
- A Ring video doorbell, mounted next to the front door of a house
- Type: Subsidiary
- Predecessor: Bot Home Automation, Inc.
- Founded: November 15, 2013; 12 years ago (as Doorbot)
- Founder: Jamie Siminoff
- Headquarters: Santa Monica, California, U.S.
- Key people: Jamie Siminoff (CEO)
- Products: Smart doorbells; Surveillance IP cameras; Home alarm systems
- Services: Cloud recording; Alarm monitoring
- Number of employees: 1,300 (2018)
- Parent: Amazon (2018–present)
- Website: ring.com

Ring LLC is a manufacturer of home security and smart home devices owned by Amazon. It manufactures a line of Ring smart doorbells, home security cameras, and alarm systems. It also operates Neighbors, a social network that allows users to discuss local safety and security issues, and share footage captured with Ring products. Via Neighbors, Ring provides footage and data to law enforcement agencies to assist in investigations.

The company was founded in autumn 2013 by Jamie Siminoff as the crowdfunded startup Doorbot; it was renamed Ring in autumn 2014, after which it began to receive equity investments. It was acquired by Amazon in 2018 for approximately $1.15 billion.

Ring's product lines have faced scrutiny over privacy issues. The Neighbors service has been criticized by civil rights advocacy groups as building a private surveillance network backed by law enforcement agencies until the 'Request for Assistance (RFA)' option was discontinued in 2024. Ring agreed to pay $5.8 million in 2023 to settle a lawsuit filed by the Federal Trade Commission for alleged privacy violations. Various security vulnerabilities have also been discovered in Ring products.

== History ==
=== As a startup (2013–2017) ===
Short-lived Ring logo, introduced March 26, 2025. It was quickly reverted back to the 2014 one after about a week.

In November 2013, Ring was founded as Doorbot by Jamie Siminoff. Doorbot was crowdfunded via Christie Street, and raised US$364,000, more than the $250,000 requested. Siminoff's team envisioned the product's concept as an "alarm system literally turned inside out" in comparison to other security systems, describing it as a "pre-crime" system. In 2013, Siminoff and Doorbot appeared on an episode of the reality series Shark Tank to seek a $700,000 investment in the company, which he estimated was worth $7 million. Kevin O'Leary made an offer as a potential investor, but Siminoff declined it. Siminoff estimated that the appearance led to $5 million in additional sales.

On September 26, 2014, the company was rebranded as Ring as it launched its second-generation hardware; Siminoff explained that the new name and updated hardware was more reflective of the company's positioning of the doorbell as a home security product.

In 2016, Shaquille O'Neal acquired an equity stake in Ring, and subsequently became a spokesperson in the company's marketing. The company raised over $200 million in investments from Kleiner Perkins, Qualcomm Ventures, Goldman Sachs, DFJ Growth and Sir Richard Branson.

In 2017, ADT sued Ring for trade secret theft in the case of ADT vs. Mike Harris relating to Ring Alarm. Sales of the alarm product were preliminarily blocked by a judge in late 2017. The case ended up settling for an unconfirmed $25 million. With a reported burn rate of $10 to $12 million per month and incurred legal expenses, Ring needed to raise cash. The ADT settlement, however, spooked investors causing the CEO to seek a quick sale.

Siminoff's attitude towards Amazon changed overnight. In a November 2017 interview with the Ambient, when asked about Amazon Key, the CEO responded,

"Amazon is both an investor in Ring as well as a strong partner, so we have a lot of respect there but, in this instance with what they've done, I was never a fan of how this was put together," he explains. "I don't believe the seal around the home should ever be breached by a third-party company. No matter how many cameras you have and how much control you have over it, I just don't think it's a good idea."

"To me, it's backwards because Amazon is usually so thoughtful around scale and when you're doing like 50 million interactions a day, even if the smallest percentage – like 0.0001% goes wrong – that could be like five deaths a day!"

According to emails between Jeff Bezos and other Amazon executives unearthed during a congressional investigation, Amazon began conducting due diligence to acquire Ring in November 2017.

=== Subsidiary of Amazon (2018–present) ===
On April 12, 2018, Ring was acquired by Amazon for approximately $839 million. Emails obtained by Congress revealed that, despite Amazon executives' concerns about Ring's quality and security, Bezos valued Ring for its market share, not its technology. One email revealed that Amazon evaluated sales data before buying two of the top four wireless home security device manufacturers.

In May 2018, Ring launched the hyperlocal social network Neighbors, which is designed to allow users to anonymously discuss local safety and security issues, as well as share photos and videos captured with Ring products. The service also allows local police departments to post bulletins, and for them to request footage from users that may assist in investigations.

In September 2019, the House Judiciary Committee began investigating the acquisition of Ring, Blink, and Eero as part of an investigation into digital markets.

In September 2020, Amazon announced a new platform known as Amazon Sidewalk, which is designed to allow Internet of things (IoT) devices to communicate over the internet via a wireless mesh network formed by devices such as its Echo speakers. Ring products are supported by the platform.

The United States House Committee on Oversight and Accountability launched an investigation into Ring's data-sharing partnerships with local governments and police departments on February 19, 2020.

In October 2020, Congress published the report on competition in digital markets, featuring their findings on acquisitions entrenching Amazon Alexa's dominance of the 'internet of things'. Along with the rationale for acquiring Ring, the investigation also surfaced Siminoff's involvement in the Eero acquisition, hinting at the Ring Alarm Pro: an Eero + Ring hub launched in 2021.

In April 2021, ADT Inc. sued Ring for trademark infringement, after re-introducing blue octagonal signs that were too similar to the ADT logo. Ring first agreed to cease using a similar logo in 2016 following a prior complaint.

In September 2022, Amazon-owned MGM Television launched a syndicated television series co-branded with Ring, Ring Nation, which highlights viral videos recorded using phones, home security cameras, and smart doorbells. Despite its title, the series is not exclusive to footage captured with Ring products.

In March 2023, Ring founder Jamie Siminoff stepped down as CEO to become "Chief Inventor". He was replaced by Elizabeth Hamren, a former executive at Discord, Oculus, and Xbox.

In May 2023, the Federal Trade Commission reached a $5.8 million settlement with Ring, asserting that Ring "[compromised] its customers' privacy by allowing any employee or contractor to access consumers' private videos and by failing to implement basic privacy and security protections, enabling hackers to take control of consumers' accounts, cameras, and videos." Among many claims, the complaint alleges, "between June and August 2017, a Ring employee viewed thousands of video recordings belonging to at least 81 unique female users (including customers and Ring employees)."

== Products and services ==
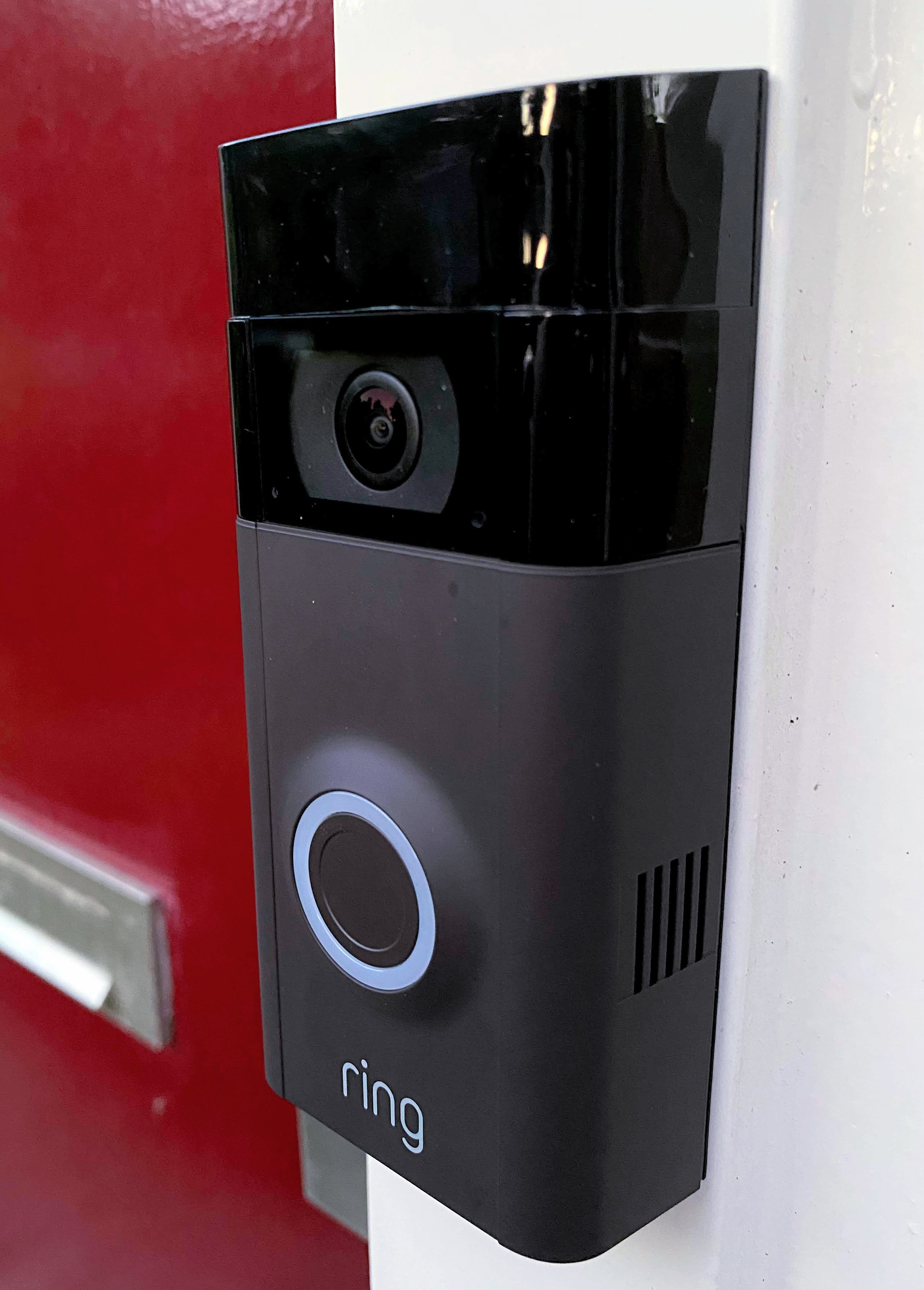
Ring Video Doorbell 2

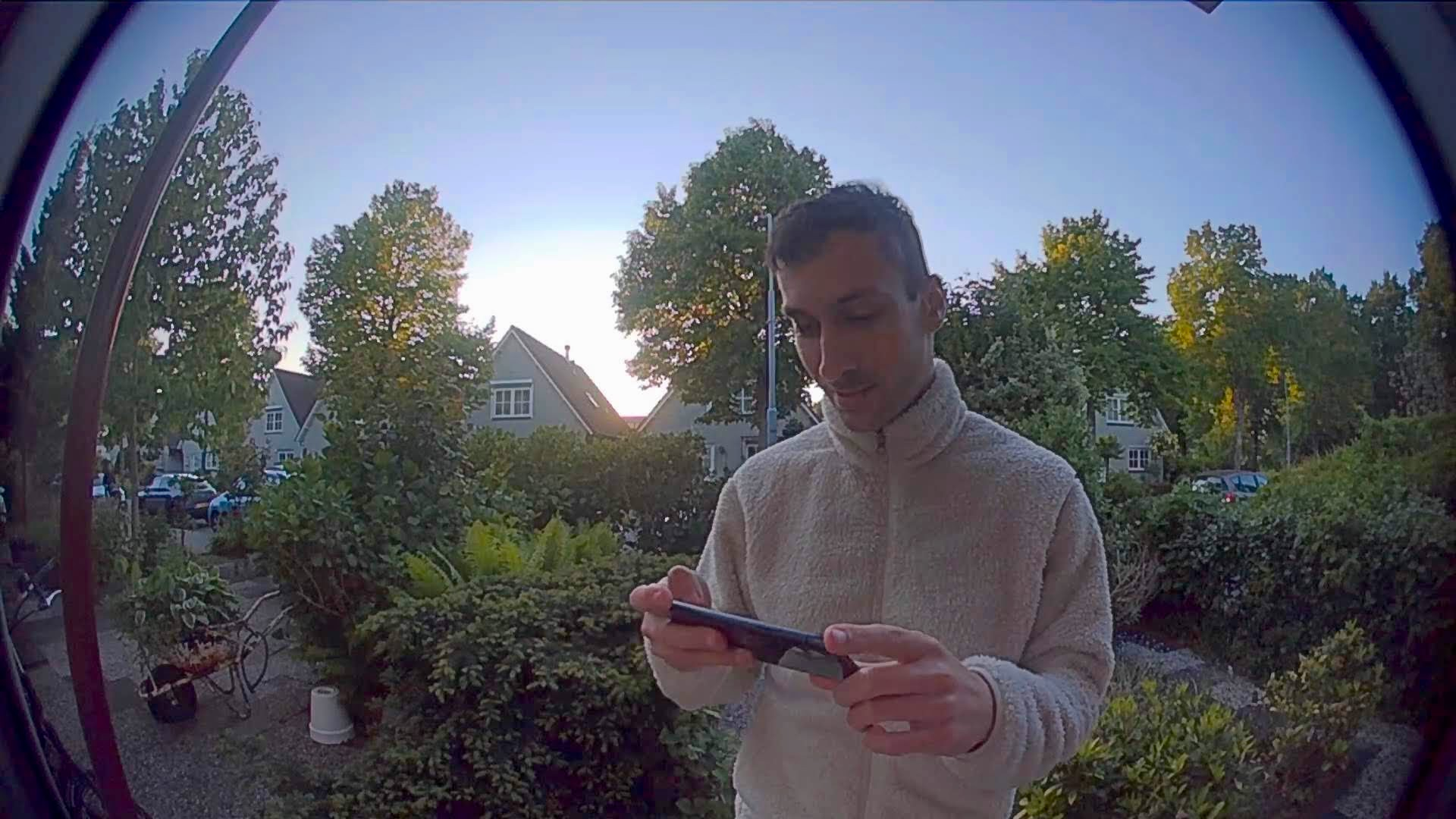
A screen capture from a Ring doorbell

=== Ring Video Doorbell ===
The Ring Video Doorbell is the company's flagship product; it is a smart doorbell that contains a high-definition camera, a motion sensor, and a microphone and speaker for two-way audio communication. It integrates with an associated mobile app, Neighbors, which allows users to view real-time video from the camera, receive notifications when the doorbell is rung, and communicate with visitors at the door via the integrated speaker and microphone. It is also capable of operating as a surveillance camera, and can automatically trigger recordings when rung, or when its motion sensors are activated.

A second-generation model, Ring Doorbell 2, was released in 2017, with updated hardware and a 1080p camera with improved low-light performance. The Ring Doorbell Pro interoperates with Amazon Alexa to play prerecorded greetings to visitors and allow visitors to leave a message.

The "Ring Chime" accessory is a unit plugged into a power outlet to play the doorbell's chime. The "Chime Pro" is an extended version that also doubles as a wireless repeater for Wi-Fi networks.

In November 2020, Amazon announced the recall of 350,000 Ring doorbells in the United States and 8,700 in Canada due to a potential fire risk.

=== Ring Cameras ===
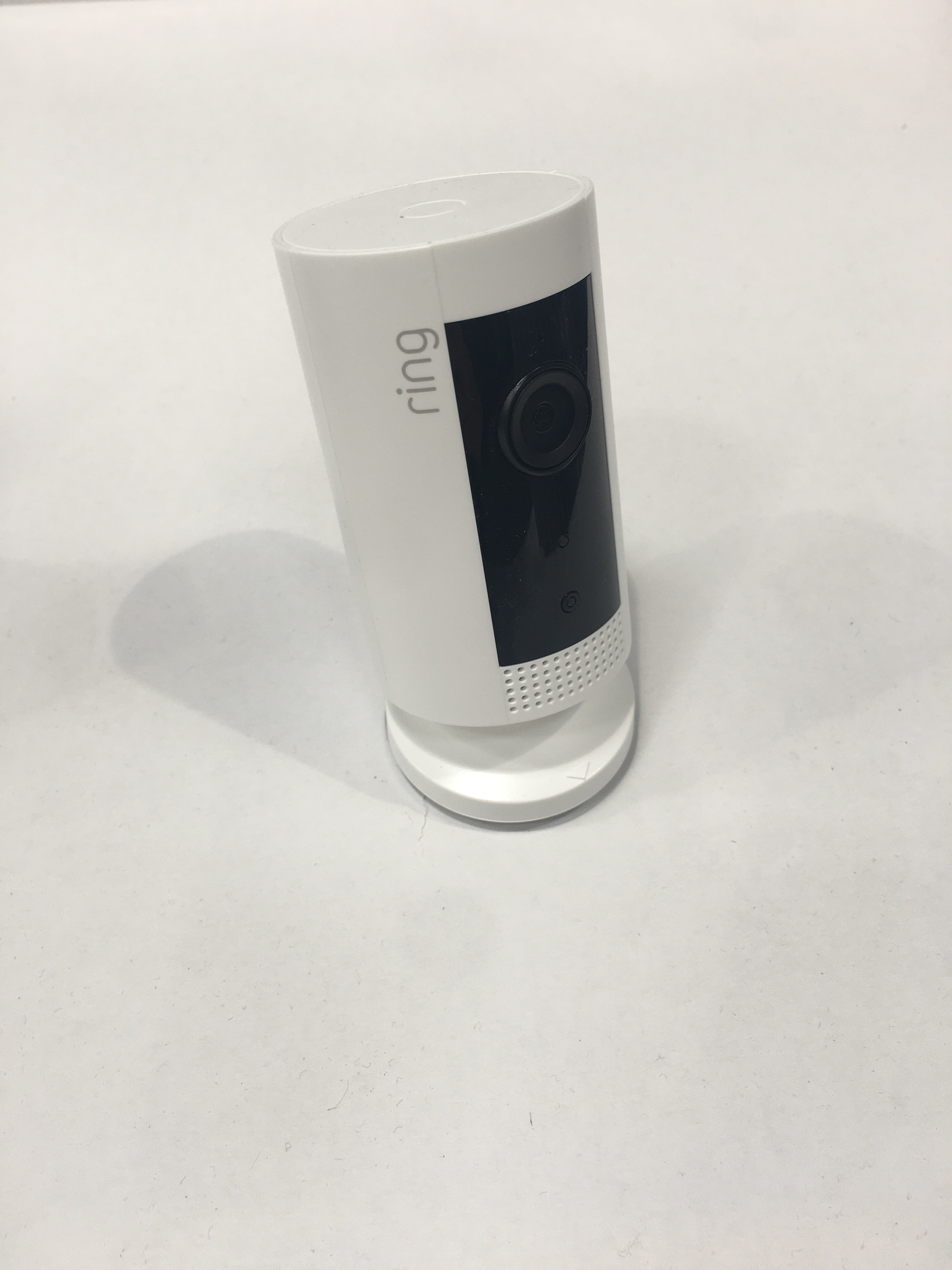
Ring Indoor Cam

In 2015, Ring released the "Stick-Up Cam", a wireless IP camera. It was updated in 2018 with a cylindrical form factor, motion detection, two-way audio, as well as battery, wired, and solar power options. In 2017, Ring released the "Floodlight Cam", a camera integrated with a pair of motion-activated LED floodlights, and in 2019, the "Ring Indoor Cam" was released. At CES 2019, Ring announced a peephole camera. In 2024, Ring introduced the "Pan-Tilt Indoor Cam" as an upgraded Ring Indoor Cam with 360° panning and 169° tilting capabilities. Some cameras received a free upgrade to 2k footage in January of 2025.

=== Ring Alarm ===
In July 2018, Ring launched an alarm security kit called the Ring Alarm, which includes a keypad, siren, and motion sensors. In September 2021, Ring announced Ring Alarm Pro, combining Ring Alarm with the connectivity of Eero. The Ring Alarm Pro is not currently compatible with Sidewalk, but does ship with a 902-928 MHz radio, indicating that Sidewalk compatibility may be available at a later date.

=== Always Home Camera ===
In September 2020, Ring unveiled the "Always Home Cam", an aerial indoor camera that flies on a predetermined path when activated by an alarm sensor.

=== Automotive security ===
In September 2020, Ring unveiled a new line of automotive products, including the Ring Car Alarm and Car Cam. Car Alarm is an OBD-II car alarm that can send alerts of events such as break-ins via Ring and Amazon Alexa, and leverages Amazon Sidewalk for connectivity. Car Cam consists of a dashcam and a rear window camera to capture the interior of a car, and features similar car alarm functionality, as well as "emergency crash assist" to automatically notify emergency services if a "serious crash" is detected, as well as having a "traffic stop" voice command.

In addition, Ring announced the launch of Car Connect—a platform allowing car manufacturers to integrate existing cameras and security systems within vehicles (such as backup cameras) into the Ring platform. Tesla was announced as the first partner for Car Connect, with plans to offer an aftermarket accessory for the Model 3, Model X, Model S, and Model Y in 2021.

=== Amazon Sidewalk ===
In late 2017, Ring acquired Iotera, an internet of things (IoT) company known for its small location-based trackers. In September 2019, Amazon announced "Amazon Sidewalk", a low-bandwidth long-range wireless communication protocol based on Iotera's technology. In January 2022, Ring announced Ring Sidewalk Bridge Pro to extend Sidewalk coverage to public spaces. In March 2023, Amazon opened up the Sidewalk protocol to developers, claiming IoT network coverage of up to 90% of the country with mainly Ring and Alexa devices.

=== Subscription plans ===
Ring products require a "Ring Protect" subscription plan in order to store and view recordings from the cameras; without a subscription, the user is limited to real-time footage only. The "Ring Protect Basic" plan allows footage to be retained for 60 days up to 180 days, while the "Ring Protect Plus" subscription adds "unlimited" storage of footage, enables professional monitoring and LTE cellular backup on the Ring Alarm, and extends the warranty on the user's Ring products from one year to the life of the devices.

As of March 29, 2023, the Home/Away modes feature will also require a subscription. For new users, Ring Protect will be required in order to use Ring Alarm via the mobile app, otherwise the system may only be controlled with the physical keypad.

=== Neighbors ===
Neighbors is a hyperlocal social networking app launched by Ring in 2018. Described as being akin to a neighborhood watch, it allows users to crowdsource information on and discuss safety and security concerns in their area. The service allows users to share footage captured from Ring products. All user posts are anonymous and do not include specific location information, and are moderated to remove off-topic content (in contrast to services such as Nextdoor). Ring also has partnerships with local police departments in some cities to incorporate Neighbors into their crime monitoring processes, who are able to make official posts for distribution on the service. Ring has credited the service with having helped to solve crimes, and noted that activity on the service surged in areas of California affected by wildfires in November 2018.

Amazon disclosed Ring's criteria for accepting requests from police departments for video footage shared to Neighbors in a response to Massachusetts Senator Ed Markey on November 1, 2019. Ring stated that each police request was required to be associated with a case number and submitted individually, although no evidence was needed for footage to be given. Ring also stated that they provided at most 12 hours of footage recorded within the previous 45 days in a maximum search area of 0.5 square miles (1.3 km^{2}) for each request. Markey criticized Amazon's response, describing Ring as "an open door for privacy and civil liberty violations".

Police departments may access user-generated footage through the Ring Neighborhoods portal, using a map interface. Amazon claims that it seeks permission from applicable users before releasing footage to law enforcement, but may release footage without user consent in emergency situations, or under subpoena. In a July 2022 letter to Markey, Amazon stated that they had released footage without user permission at least eleven times so far in 2022—the company's first public confirmation that it has done so. In January 2024, Ring announced that the program would be discontinued, citing recent efforts to reposition Neighbors away from a focus on crime.

==== Search Party ====
In October 2025, Ring launched a feature known as Search Party, in which footage from Ring cameras may be scanned using AI object recognition to search for lost pets reported by Ring owners using the Neighbors app. Users can be notified if a lost pet is detected by their Ring camera, and receive an option to automatically send the footage to its owner as a tip towards its whereabouts. Search Party is enabled by default and is an opt-out feature. In February 2026, Ring extended the feature to allow lost pets to be reported by any Neighbors user, and announced that it would donate $1 million in Ring hardware to animal shelters. Backlash to the feature, citing its possible use by ICE and the surveillance state, spread following a Super Bowl commercial advertising Search Party.

== Reception ==
=== Products ===
TechHive gave the second-generation Ring doorbell a 4 out of 5, noting improvements in hardware and ease of installation over the first-generation model, but criticizing a lack of printed and online documentation.

== Security and privacy issues ==
=== Police partnerships ===
In June 2019, Ring faced criticism over a "Community Alert" program, under which the company has made geographically-targeted sponsored posts on social media services such as Facebook, asking readers to provide tips on suspects in verified cases, based on imagery posted on the Neighbors service by a Ring customer. Ring stated that it sought permission from the user before using their content in this manner. However, these discoveries did lead to concerns over the use of such footage in material deemed to effectively be advertising, as well as concerns over other possible uses of the footage (such as for training facial recognition) due to the broad copyright license that users must grant to in order to use Neighbors (an irrevocable, unlimited, and royalty-free license to use shared content "for any purpose and in any media formats in any media channels without compensation to you"), and Ring's partnerships with local law enforcement agencies.

Digital rights advocacy group Fight for the Future criticized Ring for using its cameras and Neighbors app to build a private surveillance network via partnerships with local law enforcement agencies, which encourage them to promote the products. The group stated that these partnerships "undermine our democratic process and basic civil liberties". According to the Electronic Frontier Foundation (EFF), Ring used these partnerships and its marketing strategies to foster fear, which leads to a "vicious cycle" that spurs hardware sales. The organization said that Ring, as well as Neighbors and similar "neighborhood watch" apps such as Citizen and Nextdoor, "facilitate reporting of so-called 'suspicious' behavior that really amounts to racial profiling." Matt Cagle of the American Civil Liberties Union (ACLU) said that the Ring Neighbors Portal "blurs the line between corporate and government surveillance" and that "Many people are not going to feel like they have a choice when law enforcement asks for access to their footage".

In July 2019, Vice publication Motherboard obtained records revealing the extent of Ring's partnership with the Lakeland (Florida) Police Department (LPD). The department was granted access to a "Law Enforcement Neighborhood Portal" for making posts on Neighbors and the ability to "request videos directly from Ring users," and received a donation of 15 Ring cameras. However, the memorandum of understanding stated that the LPD would be required to participate in "outreach efforts on the platform to encourage adoption of the platform/app" (receiving $10 credits for Ring camera purchases for each new user). Ring also recommended that the LPD establish specific new positions for the partnership, including a "social media coordinator". Later in the month, Motherboard obtained public records containing an officer's notes from an April 2019 training webinar, which stated that Ring had partnered with at least 200 law enforcement partners. In early August 2019, Motherboard also reported that Ring would match payments by cities to cover the subsidized purchase of Ring cameras, so that they could be resold to residents at a discount.

In November 2020, a pilot program in Jackson, Mississippi, enabled participating Ring users to allow police to access live feeds from their cameras at any time.

In September 2025, Ring launched "Search Party", a feature allowing Ring cameras to use AI to scan for sightings of lost pets reported on its Neighbors platform. The "Search Party" feature has faced criticism from critics and privacy advocates for its implications, including the possibility that the technology could be used to perform facial recognition of people, and the feature being opt-out.

In October 2025, Ring publicly announced a partnership with Flock Safety, under which Flock clients would be also able to use the community requests system to retrieve footage from Ring devices. The partnership faced criticism due to Flock's already-controversial automated license plate recognition (ALPR) cameras; the EFF described the partnership as having effectively created a "round-the-clock warrantless digital dragnet that keeps tabs on everyone whether or not they're suspected of any crime."

In February 2026, following Ring's broadcast of a commercial during Super Bowl LX which portrayed the Search Party feature being used to locate lost dogs, the company was accused of using pathos to normalize mass surveillance, especially due to its partnerships with companies such as Flock. Ring responded that that the system was only designed to identify pets and was "not capable of processing human biometrics", and was "[built] with strong privacy protections from the start".

On February 12, 2026, Ring announced that it would withdraw from its partnership with Flock, and stated that the partnership had never officially been implemented.

=== Use of facial recognition technology ===
In February 2018, Business Insider reported references to use of facial recognition technology in Ring's privacy policy. The policy stated:

Where permitted by applicable law, you may choose to use additional functionality in your Ring product that, through video data from your device, can recognize facial characteristics of familiar visitors. For example, you may want to receive different notifications from your Ring Doorbell depending on whether a visitor is a stranger or a member of your household. If you choose to activate this feature, we obtain certain facial feature information about the visitors you ask your Ring product to recognize. We require your explicit consent before you can take advantage of this feature.

In December 2018, patents filed by Ring surfaced to identify "suspicious" people and automatically alert police.

In August 2019, a Buzzfeed News reported, "Ring Says It Doesn't Use Facial Recognition, But It Has "A Head Of Face Recognition Research."" The piece reported on a 2018 presentation from Ring Ukraine's "Head of Face Recognition Research", as well as a statement from Ring Ukraine's website stating, "We develop semi-automated crime prevention and monitoring systems which are based on, but not limited to, face recognition."

Also in 2019, as part of his investigation into Ring's cooperation with law enforcement, Senator Ed Markey of Massachusetts probed the company's privacy policy's reference to use of facial recognition technology. Amazon responded:

We do not currently offer facial recognition technology in Ring products. This sentence in the Privacy Notice refers to a contemplated, but unreleased feature. We do frequently innovate based on customer demand, and facial recognition features are increasingly common in consumer security cameras today, such as: Google Nest Hello, Tend Secure Lynx, Netamo Welcome, Wisenet Smartcam, and Honeywell Smart Home Security. If our customers want these features in Ring security cameras, we will only release these feature with thoughtful design including privacy, security, and user control; and we will clearly communicate with our customers as we offer new features.

In November 2019, the Intercept reported on internal documents detailing "Proactive Suspect Matching". The feature would use facial recognition to group videos and create a profile of an alleged criminal based on Ring camera footage. Ring denied that the feature was in use or development.

In 2020, Ring posted a one-sentence position stance on its blog stating, "Ring does not use facial recognition technology in any of its devices or services, and will neither sell nor offer facial recognition technology to law enforcement." In 2021, Senator Markey and his colleagues introduced the "Facial Recognition and Biometric Technology Moratorium Act." A year later, Markey renewed his investigation into Ring, and in July 2022, Markey cited Ring's "[refusal] to commit to not incorporating facial recognition technology in its products" as evidence of the need for legislation to "prohibit use of biometric technology by federal agencies and condition federal grant funding to state and local entities on moratoria on the use of biometric technology."

Amazon has attempted to distance itself from Ring Ukraine, the branch responsible for developing computer vision and facial recognition solutions. In a statement for release, the general manager of the Kyiv-based office commented, "We are no longer part of a small startup, but a full-fledged R&D center working for one of the world's largest corporations. [We are involved not only in Ring's product line but also in many other Amazon projects. That is,] We are a large Ukrainian team of specialists working on the world market." At legal's request, the general manager was asked to remove the reference to Amazon. "Ring Ukraine" was eventually rebranded as "Squad".

In September 2025, Ring launched a new beta feature known as "Familiar Faces", which "intelligently recognizes familiar people and empowers customers to reduce notifications triggered by familiar people's routine activities". The feature has been criticized as an implementation of facial recognition by the Ring product.

=== Vulnerabilities ===
In January 2019, it was uncovered that employees at Ring's two offices had access to the video recordings from all Ring devices. In addition, The Intercept reported that the video data was stored unencrypted. In a December 2019 test, Motherboard found that Ring's software did not implement security features such as recognizing unknown IP addresses or providing a display of active login sessions, allowing the publication to access a Ring account from IP addresses based in multiple countries without warning the user.

The Neighbors network leaks metadata about the footage posted in videos and "crime alerts". This metadata, combined with public city map data, is frequently sufficient to discover the exact location of the Ring doorbell or a camera. In one experiment, Gizmodo located 20,000 devices based on information collected (scraped from the app) over a period of month. University researchers were able to locate 440,000 devices using data spanning back to 2016.

Cybersecurity firm Bitdefender identified a vulnerability in the Ring Video Doorbell Pro product in July 2019, which was patched before being publicly disclosed in November 2019. Hackers accessed a number of Ring cameras in December 2019 and used the device speakers to broadcast racial slurs, threats, and other inflammatory language to multiple households across the United States. A Motherboard investigation discovered crime forums that distributed software exploits of Ring devices that were used in the cyberattacks, and that members of the hacking forum Nulled had been recording their breaches as "podcasts". Ring responded to the incidents by advising its users to have strong passwords, enable two-factor authentication, and adopt other security measures. Ring mandated two-factor authentication for all users on February 18, 2020.

=== Allegations of user tracking ===
On January 27, 2020, the Electronic Frontier Foundation concluded that the Ring doorbell app for Android was sending identifiable personal information—including names, IP addresses, mobile network carriers, persistent IDs, and sensor data—to AppsFlyer, branch.io, Facebook, and Mixpanel.
