= YoBike =

British dockless bicycle sharing company

- Company type: Private
- Industry: Transportation
- Founded: March 2017 operating since May 2017
- Area served: Bristol; Southampton; The Netherlands; Dublin, Ireland; Singapore; Mexico; France
- Products: Bicycle-sharing services
- Website: yobike.co.uk

YoBike was the UK's first dockless bicycle sharing company, founded in early 2017. The bikes are unlocked via YoBike's smartphone app. YoBike first launched in Bristol in May 2017, followed by Southampton in September 2017, but had ceased operations in both cities by 2021.

== History ==
YoBike was co-founded by Bin Wang and Michael Qian in early 2017, citing Bristol's strong cycling culture as a main factor in their decision to launch. In early May 2017, 300 initial bicycles were deployed in Bristol.

In 2017 the cost were £1 per hour, with a daily cap of £5; an annual commuter pass was £39 entitling a rider to two one-hour long journeys each day. Whilst bikes were allowed to be parked anywhere, the YoBike app indicates suggested parking areas to promote good cycling habits.

Against early claims of illegal parking, YoBike offered users a 50p discount on their rides if illegally parked bikes were returned to the central Bristol area. In mid-September, YoBike launched 300 bikes in Southampton (however, the company has pulled out of the city in August 2019).

As of April 2018, YoBike had a fleet of 1000 bikes in Bristol, 300 bikes in Southampton and around 1000 bikes in Singapore, Mexico City, and Austin, Texas. It announced expansion into France and China.

YoBike ceased hire operations in Southampton in August 2019 and in Bristol in March 2021.

The business continues to operate internationally through its white-label operations, such as 'IndigoWeel' in France.

== Equipment and usage ==
YoBike members use the YoBike app on their phones to locate nearby bicycles. Each bicycle is equipped with a smart lock which is accessed via Bluetooth. They use the app to scan the QR code and unlock the bike, and then manually lock the bike in a designated parking zone. In addition, YoBike users can suggest parking places via the YoBike app.

== See also ==
- List of bicycle-sharing systems
