= Computer repair technician =

Person who repairs and maintains computers and servers

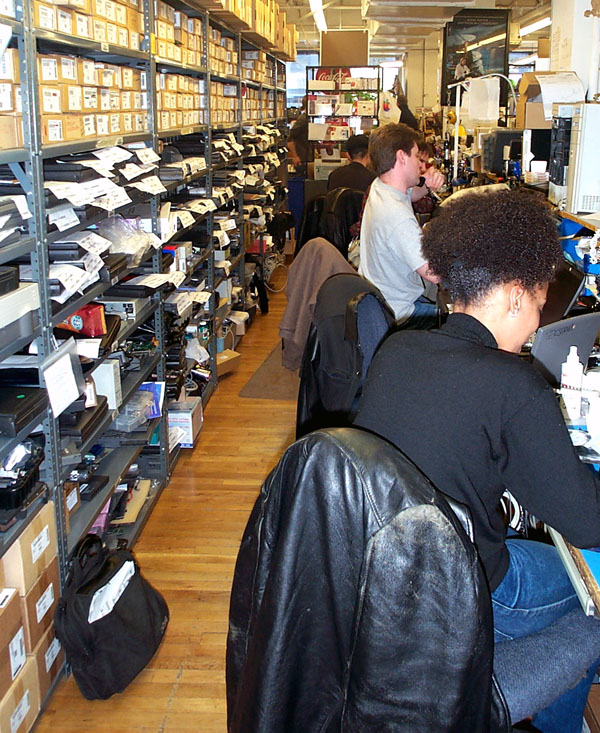
Computer technicians working at stations (2000). Tagged repairs in process can be seen on lower shelves at left, and service parts in labeled boxes seen above them.

A computer repair technician is a person who repairs and maintains devices including desktops, laptops, phones and servers. The technician's responsibilities may extend to include building or configuring new hardware, installing and updating software packages, and creating and maintaining computer networks.

== Overview ==
Computer technicians work in a variety of settings, encompassing both the public and private sectors. Because of the relatively brief existence of the profession, institutions offer certificate and degree programs designed to prepare new technicians, but computer repairs are frequently performed by experienced and certified technicians who have little formal training in the field.

Private sector computer repair technicians can work in corporate information technology departments, central service centers or in retail computer sales environments. Public sector computer repair technicians might work in the military, national security or law enforcement communities, health or public safety field, or an educational institution. Despite the vast variety of work environments, all computer repair technicians perform similar physical and investigative processes, including technical support and often customer service. Experienced computer repair technicians might specialize in fields such as data recovery, system administration, networking or information systems. Some computer repair technicians are self-employed or own a firm that provides services in a regional area. Some are subcontracted as freelancers or consultants. This type of computer repair technician ranges from hobbyists and enthusiasts to those who work professionally in the field.

Computer malfunctions can range from a minor setting that is incorrect, to spyware, viruses, and as far as replacing hardware and an entire operating system. Some technicians provide on-site services, usually at an hourly rate. Others can provide services off-site, where the client can drop their computers and other devices off at the repair shop. Some have pickup and drop off services for convenience. Some technicians may also take back old equipment for recycling. This is required in the EU, under WEEE rules.

== Hardware repair ==
While computer hardware configurations vary widely, a computer repair technician that works on OEM equipment will work with five general categories of hardware; desktop computers, laptops, servers, computer clusters and smartphones / mobile computing devices. Technicians also work with and occasionally repair a range of peripherals, including input devices (like keyboards, mice, webcams and scanners), output devices (like displays, printers, and speakers), and data storage devices such as internal and external hard drives and disk arrays. Technicians involved in system administration might also work with networking hardware, including routers, switches, cabling, fiber optics, and wireless networks.

== Software repair ==
When possible, computer repair technicians protect the computer user's data and settings. Following a repair, an ideal scenario will give the user access to the same data and settings that were available to them prior to repair. To address a software problem, the technician could take an action as minor as adjusting a single setting or they may implore more involved techniques such as: installing, uninstalling, or reinstalling various software packages. Advanced software repairs often involve directly editing keys and values in the Windows Registry or running commands directly from the command prompt.

A reliable, but somewhat more complicated procedure for addressing software issues is known as a system restore (also referred to as imaging, and/or reimaging), in which the computer's original installation image (including operating system and original applications) is reapplied to a formatted hard drive. Anything unique such as settings or personal files will be destroyed and ergo only available if backed up onto external media, as this reverts everything back to its original unused state. The computer technician can only reimage if there is an image of the hard drive for that computer either in a separate partition or stored elsewhere.

On a Microsoft Windows system, if there is a restore point that was saved (normally saved on the hard drive of the computer) then the installed applications and Windows Registry can be restored to that point. This procedure may solve problems that have arisen after the time the restore point was created.

If no image or system restore point is available, a fresh copy of the operating system is recommended. Formatting and reinstalling the operating system will require the license information from the initial purchase. If none is available, the operating system may require a new licence to be used.

== Data recovery ==
One of the best tasks performed by some specialized technicians is data recovery. This is the process of recovering lost data from a corrupted or otherwise inaccessible hard drive.

In most cases third-party data recovery software is used to retrieve the data and transfer it to a new hard drive. Specialists say in about 15% of the cases the data is unable to be recovered as the hard disk is damaged to a point where it will no longer function.

Blackblaze's annual report indicates that the hard drive failure rate for the first quarter of 2020 was 1.07%.

== Education ==
Education requirements vary by company and individual proprietor. The entry level requirement is generally based on the extent of the work expected. Often a 4 year degree will be required for a more specialized technician, where as a general support technician may only require a 2 year degree or some post secondary classes.

== Certifications & Achievements ==
=== Common Certifications ===
The most common certifications for computer technicians are the CompTIA Tech+, A+ and Network+ Certifications.

==== Additional Computer Technician Certifications & Achievements ====
- Apple (ACSP, ACMT, ACTC)
- Dell Client Systems Support & Troubleshooting (Achievement). This is the only Dell Exam for Computer Repair. However, Dell does offer certifications for PowerEdge Server Foundations.
- International Information Systems Security Certification Consortium (CISSP)
- Information Systems Audit and Control Association (ISACA)
- Project Management Professional (PMP)

Additional Network Technician Certifications

- Cisco CCNA and CCNP
- Cisco CCIE Enterprise Infrastructure and CCIE Enterprise Wireless
- SolarWinds Certified Professional
- Wireshark WCNA

== License ==
In Texas, computer companies and professionals are required to have private investigators’ licenses if they access computer data for purposes other than diagnosis or repair. Texas Occupations Code, Chapter 1702 section 104, subsection 4(b).

== See also ==
- Information systems technician
- Rework (electronics)
- 3-Pronged Parts Retriever
