= Door loop =

Cabling for electricity between a swing door and frame

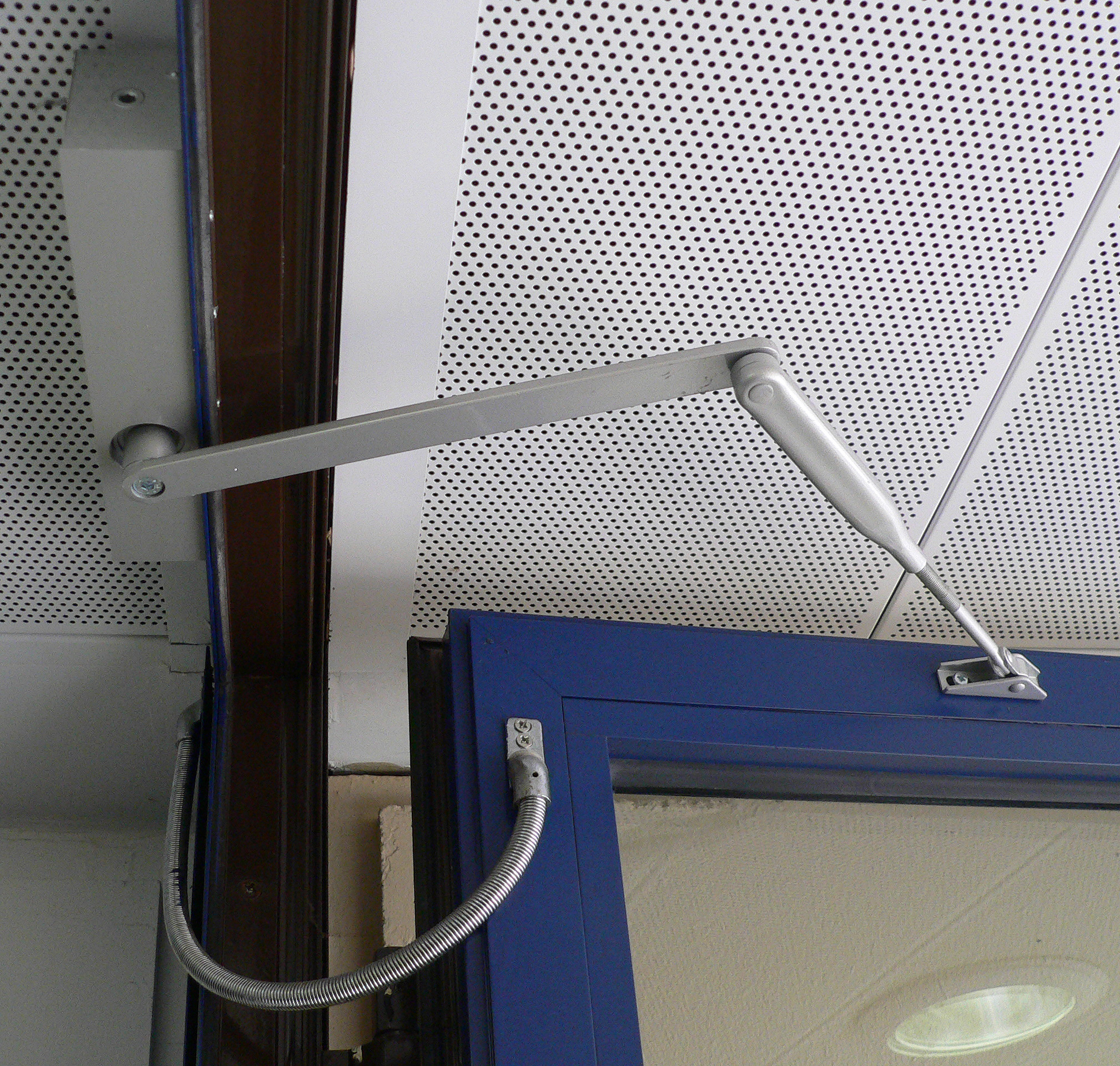
Electrically controlled door closer which receives electricity via a (visible) door loop.

A door loop or door cord is a mechanical device which provides a robust guideway for cabling between a swing door (the "door leaf") and a door frame.

Door loops are described in the NFPA 80 standard for fire doors.

== Motivation ==
Door loops are used in cases where electrical components are mounted in the door leaf, like for example a motorized door lock, smart lock, smart doorbell or solenoid bolt. Since the hinges move during operation, a normal laying of cable would quickly wear out. The door loop also ensures that the twisting of the cables is distributed over a longer cable length, which is decisive for the wear of the cables.

== Mounting ==
Normally, the door loop is mounted inside the door frame ("concealed door loops"), and can not be seen except for when the door is open. Another type is surface mounted transfers which serve the same function ("visible door loops"), which normally can be seen on the top of the door at all times.
