= Streetlife (website) =

British social networking website

Streetlife was a British social networking website that linked users together based on the neighbourhood where they live.

== Background ==
Streetlife was developed by entrepreneur and software developer Matt Boyes, after his brother-in-law's new London home had been burgled in 2008 and he had found it awkward to get in contact with his neighbours. Originally called "Streetbook", it was trialled in the London Borough of Wandsworth. Streetlife.com was launched in the rest of the UK on 21 March 2011.

Streetlife received financial investment from newspaper and magazine company Archant, Caffè Nero co-founder Paul Ettinger, and Friends Reunited founder Steve Pankhurst, amongst others. By 2013, they had raised £1.4 million in investment and Archant's media connections were used to re-market the website.

By 2015, Streetlife claimed to have a million members, doubling its size over the first six months of the year and covering 4,000 communities across the UK.

In February 2017, Streetlife was purchased by US firm Nextdoor. Streetlife sent an email to its members recommending they transfer to Nextdoor. It announced Streetlife would be closed at the end of the month. However, Nextdoor's different privacy policy has provoked anger and serious safety concerns amongst some former Streetlife users.
