= Door closer =

Mechanical device that closes a door in a controlled manner

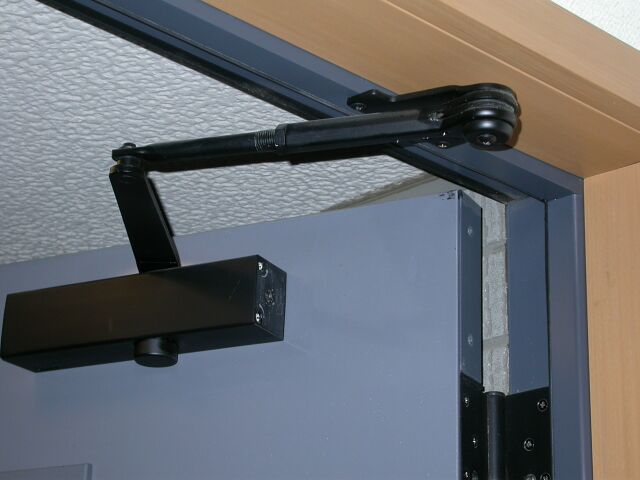
Modern manual door closer

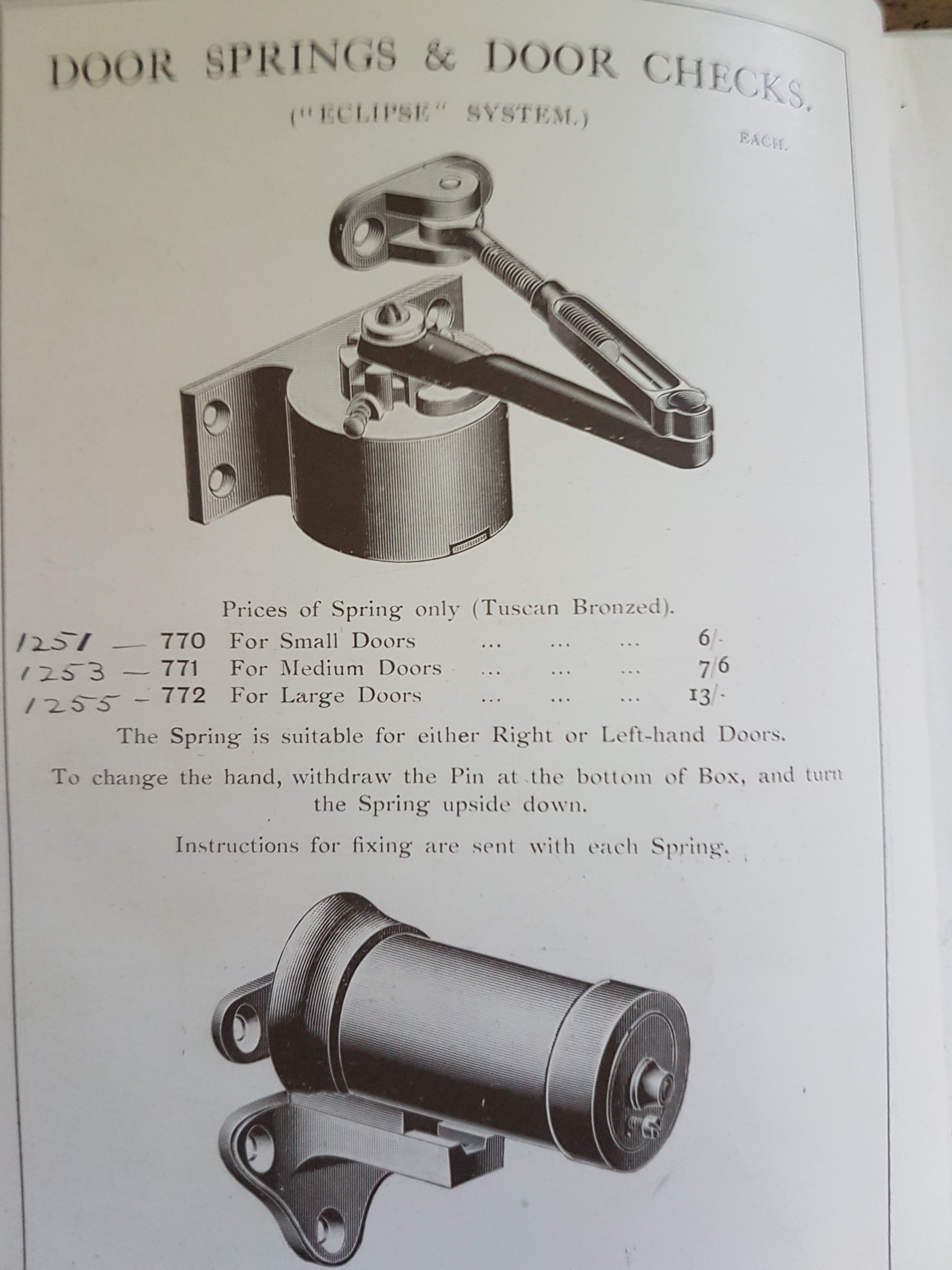
Eclipse door spring and separate checking mechanism

A door closer is a mechanical device that regulates the speed and action of a door's swing. Manual closers store the force used to open the door in some type of spring and reuse it to close the door. Automatic types use electricity to regulate door swing behavior.

Door closers can be linked to a building's fire and security alarm systems.

== History ==
Single action floor spring with pneumatic check. The brass decor plate and shoe are removed to show the internal workings.

=== Early days ===
One of the first references concerning a device to close a door can be found in the writings of Hero of Alexandria who describes his "automata" which controlled the doors of temples, both opening and closing them automatically. Weights and levers have also been used to close doors. Another device for smaller domestic doors used a loop of rope or skein fixed to the door frame, that was twisted, with a piece of wood placed in between the twists to push the door. The opening of the door twists the skein further, when the door is released the rope's torsional force pushes the arm back against the door, thereby closing it.

In more modern times the clock manufacturers Thwaites and Reed in 1850 claimed to be the original inventors of the spiral door spring. The earliest English patent for a door closing device consisting of weights and pulleys was issued in 1786 to Francis Moore. The first English patent issued that mentions a spring can be traced to a few years later to that of Henry Downer. (Ironmonger) of Fleet Street, London recognised for the invention of a "spring to shut a door" (1790). There were even earlier devices invented to close a door, for instance, Mr Delevitz's model of a door with spiral spring hinges (1768). Earlier still is reference by way of a letter between Sir Edward Filmer (3rd Bart.) and his brother, Beversham Filmer dated 1748, in which they discuss a door spring. A mechanical statue reportedly displayed by a Monsieur Delanois at the White Swan in Stamford on December 21, 1736, was said to open and close its own door.

=== Closer development ===
The first door closers consisted of just a spring mechanism only, as time went on the rate at which the door closed was arrested or checked by adding an additional checking device. Door closers at this time were known as a door spring and check. Later these two devices were combined into one unit that both closed the door and slowed the speed at which this was done. These early "door closers" used a pneumatic piston to check the speed, later models used a hydraulic or oil filled device for the same effect.

The first patent for a pneumatic device to prevent the sudden slamming of a door was given to William Bullock and James Boaz, on May 13, 1813 (Patent Number 3695). An improved hydraulic device to prevent the "clapping" (slamming) of doors was patented by William Overden Snr and William Overden Jnr in 1864. Door closers that utilize the properties of vulcanised Indian rubber have also been patented and used.

The use of door closers expanded during the Victorian era. Companies such as William Tonks and Son, James Cartland and Sons, and William Newman and Son were based in and around Birmingham. It has been claimed that one of these firms received an award in 1974 for producing their one millionth door closer, although a reliable source for this has not been identified. In 1907 the Briton B was first placed on the market.

In the United States, Lewis. C. Norton started his business in 1877, entering the door closer market in 1880 with a door check for the Trinity Church, Boston. Eugene Blount, Francis Richards and Joseph Bardsley also played important parts in the development, improvement and commercialization of door closers along with other companies, including Yale, Norton, Rixson and The Shelby Spring Hinge Company.

== Types ==
=== Manual ===
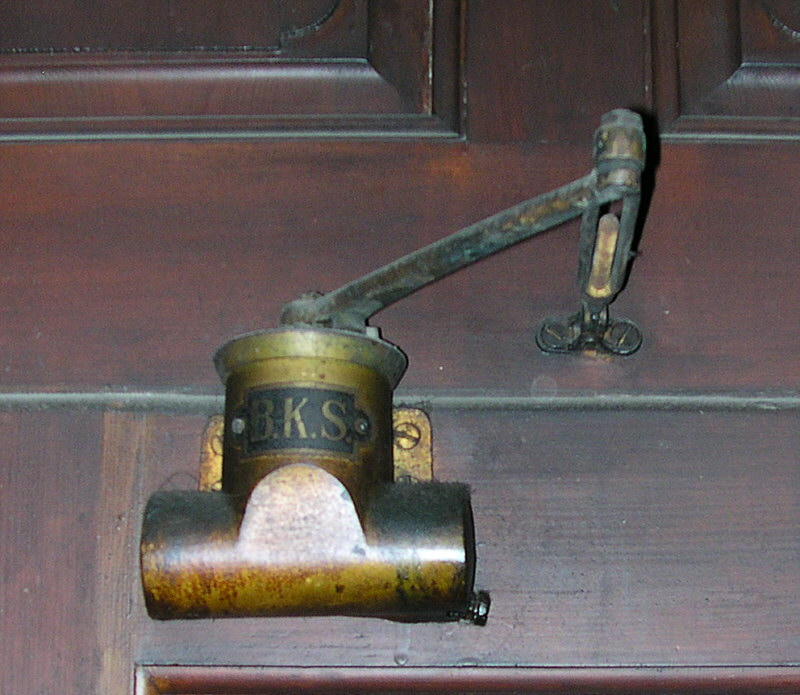
Older manual door closer (made by BKS)

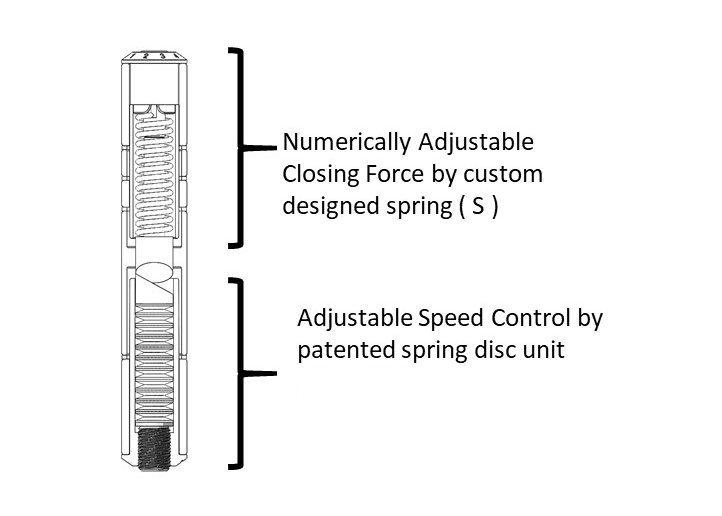
Friction-based mechanical speed control mechanism

A spring, hydraulic pressure, or a combination of both, is found in manual door closers. The energy used in opening the door is stored in a spring (compression, torsion, tension, volute or leaf), and released to close the door. Spring tension is typically adjustable, altering both opening and closing force. Most door closers use oil-filled hydraulic dampers to limit closing speed, and allow for soft closing. Other types use a friction-based mechanical speed control mechanism.

"Controlled closers" use adjustable hydraulic valves to variously regulate the door's opening and closing speed, latch speed, and delayed action return. These allow setting of the "sweep speed" (the rate which the door travels along the majority of its closure, the sole closing setting on basic closers); the "latch speed" (the rate in the last 10 to 15 degrees of closing arc, allowing it to be set faster than the "sweep" to ensure proper latch closure); "delayed action" (which slows sweep speed dramatically for roughly the first half of its range, allowing more time for passage), and opening speed (preventing a door from being opened too fast, a useful feature in crowded environments, and those where the young, old, or infirm may be present). It is also particularly well-suited to exterior doors where there is a danger of wind catching and blowing them open, potentially harming the door, nearby objects, people, or pets.

=== Automatic ===
An automatic door closer, more often called a "door opener", opens the door itself, typically under the control of a push button, motion detector or other device, and then uses a motion sensor or proximity detector to determine when it is safe to close it.

Automatic mechanisms are also used for security purposes, being controlled by a keypad, swipe card, or biometrically controlled electromagnetic device. The latter include retina scanners, fingerprint readers, and voice recognition technologies.

Electric door closers may also be hooked to a building's fire alarm system. A triggered alarm cuts power to any electromagnetic hold-open device, allowing the doors to close.

== Configurations ==
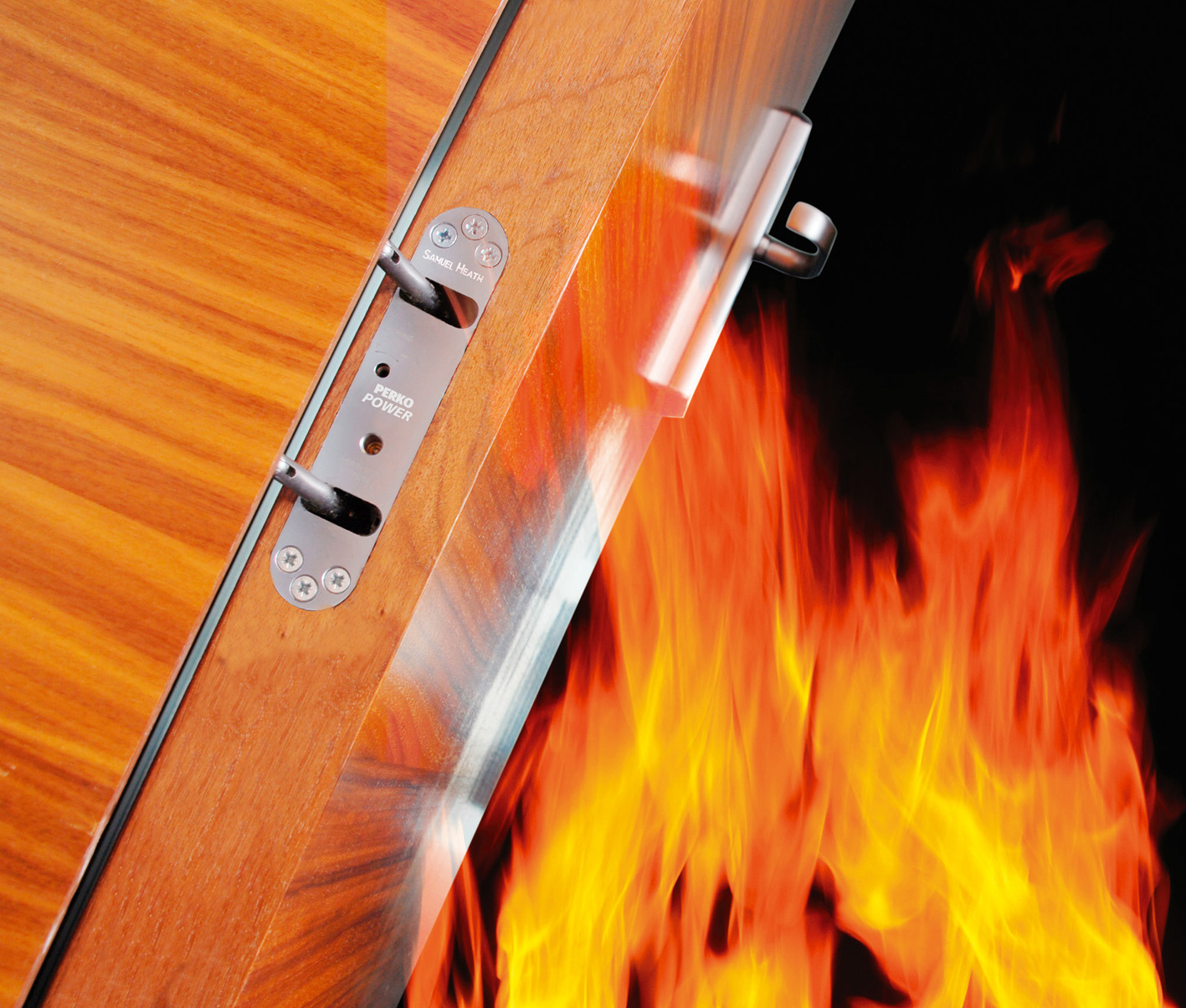
A concealed jamb-mounted door closer

There are seven configurations of interior door-closer:

- Surface-mounted
- Concealed in frame (jamb)
- Concealed in header (transom)
- Concealed in floor
- Concealed in door
- Concealed in shoe
- Integral to hinge
  - Spring Hinge
  - Self-Closing Hinge

Overhead or surface-mounted door closers come in four variations: slide-track arm, regular arm surface mounted, parallel arm surface mounted, and top jamb mounted, most are surface mounted although some manufacturers offer concealed models too.

Another type of surface mounted door closer is attached to the door frame behind the door (where the hinges are) next to the middle hinge. The "arm" (tail) rests against the door, and a spring that is twisted by the user opening the door closes the door by returning to its pre-twisted shape. This type of door closer is referred to as a "tail" spring and is one of the more simple mechanisms, having no damping control.

There is also the storm door and screen door variation of the door closer: As the name implies, these piston type closers are used on storm doors, security, and screen doors which give the home an extra line of defense against weather, intruders, and insects. Whereas interior closers typically use hydraulics, storm door closers are more typically pneumatic, using air and springs to close the door. Storm door closers often have a small metal square washer on the rod that is used to lock the closer in the open position if required, while more recent models have a button to actuate the hold open feature to make this process easier. Concealed, jamb-mounted type door closers, mounted in morticed recesses in the door and door frame, are concealed when the door is closed. These are available in controlled and uncontrolled versions, selected according to the application for which they are intended. Such concealed closers when mounted inside a pocket in the door frame (door jamb) are commonly known as "perco's" or percomatic closers.

When door closers are mounted in the header they are known as transom closers. These can be HO (hold open) or NHO (none hold open).

Door closers that are mounted in the floor directly under the pivot point beneath a decor plate are referred to as floor springs and come in two variations, single action for doors opening one way (right and left hand) and double action for doors that open inward and outward, both types can either be none hold open (NHO) or hold open (HO). They consist of a pivot which protrudes from the top of the device and mates to a shoe (or strap) that the door is connected to, some kind of spring and a damping device to control the rate at which the door closes (very early ones had no damping), these damping devices are either pneumatic (known as an air spring or air check) or hydraulic in nature. When a floor spring is used to control a door, they can be used in conjunction with hinges but generally have a single pivot point at the top of the door, this pivot point is known as a top centre. Floor springs are usually the most expensive and most hard wearing of all the door closing devices in use.

The shoe door closer, known as a heel spring, is housed entirely in the 'heel' of the door, inside a shoe. This shoe looks very much like the shoe used in conjunction with floor springs.

Spring hinge uses a spring mounted in a hinge and is integral to its design. The spring can be either visible or hidden within a tube and can be found more commonly on interior doors. When used on doors that open both ways they are known as double action spring hinges.

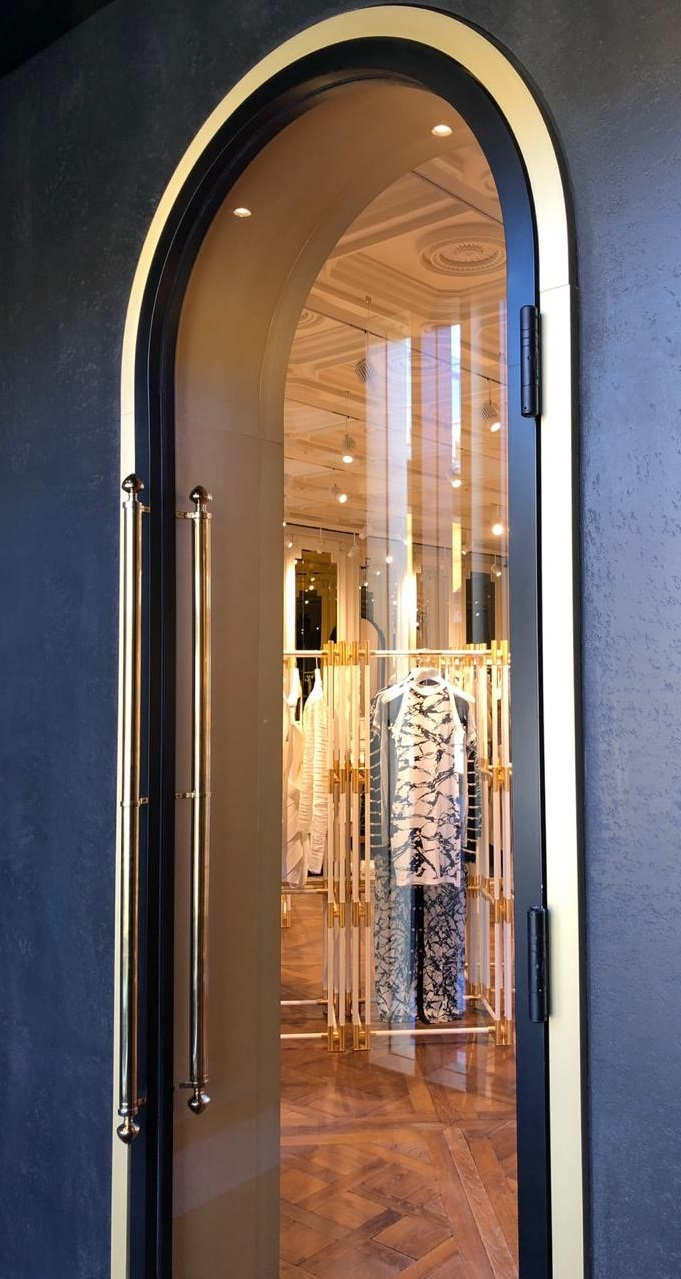
Self-closing hinges are an alternative to using a door closer.

A self-closing hinge combines door closers and spring hinges with an optional hold open feature into one component. These closer hinges eliminate the visual and physical clutter of using additional devices, as well as reduce maintenance problems associated with overhead and in-floor door closers. They are especially useful where other types of closers are difficult to use. The most durable self-closing hinge can handle doors up to 440 lb.

== Usage ==
Door closers are widely used in both residential and non-residential settings. At home, they are most commonly found on screen and storm doors. They are also used in numerous applications in commercial, industrial, institutional, and public facilities from libraries and schools to museums and airports.

=== Fire safety ===
In non-residential settings, door closers are most commonly installed on bathroom doors, fire doors, and exit doors. During a fire, any door that penetrates a firewall must be fire-rated. Fire doors need to be closed in case of fire to help prevent the spread of fire and smoke. Any fire doors which are normally held open must automatically close and lock when a fire is present in the building. The function of an emergency exit rim device (crash bar or panic bar) will permit escape through a fire door, however it must re-latch once released. (A fire door must not be "dogged" to disable its latch.) In most countries fire door performance will be governed by national standards.

=== Temperature control ===
Door closers also play a role in maintaining desired interior temperatures, reducing air movement in and out of conditioned space.

=== Security ===
Door closers also play a role in security at building entrance doors, closing doors once somebody has passed through and re-latching the door lock.

=== Noise control ===
In buildings that require noise control (studios) door closers play an important part in the suppression of unwanted noise both in and out rooms and the buildings themselves.

=== Privacy ===
Door closers are often used to ensure privacy in toilets and washrooms.

=== Hygiene ===
Door closers can also play a part in keeping buildings and rooms free from dirt, debris and pests.

== See also ==
- Door loop, a method for providing electric cabling to a door
