= Citizen (app) =

Public safety application

- Developers: sp0n, Inc.
- Release: March 2017
- Operating system: Android, iOS
- Available in: English
- Type: mobile app (safety, news)
- Website: citizen.com

sp0n, Inc.
- Type: Private
- Founder: Andrew Frame
- Products: Citizen mobile app
- Website: citizen.com

Citizen is a mobile app that sends users location-based safety alerts in real time. It allows users to read updates about ongoing reports, broadcast live video, and leave comments. The app uses radio antennas installed in major cities to monitor 911 communications, with employees filtering the audio to generate alerts. The app is currently available for iOS and Android devices in the United States covering over 60 cities, including New York City, the San Francisco Bay Area, Baltimore, Los Angeles, Philadelphia, Detroit, Atlanta, Indianapolis, Phoenix, Cincinnati, Chicago, Minneapolis, Saint Paul, and Cleveland.

Developed by sp0n, Inc. and originally called Vigilante in 2016, it was rebranded and launched in New York on March 8, 2017. In June 2020, it was reported that the app had over five million active users. Investors include Sequoia Capital, 8VC, RRE Ventures, Founders Fund, Slow Ventures, Greycroft, and Lux Capital. In March 2020, Citizen added the COVID-19 digital contact tracer SafePass. The app has been controversial in its original form of Vigilante, as being an enabler of mob justice.

== History ==
=== Vigilante ===
The original Vigilante app was developed by sp0n, an American technology incubator formed in 2015 by software programmer Andrew Frame, and it was developed to "[open] up the 911 system." Frame, who had previously started public telecommunications company Ooma, Inc. and was an early advisor to Facebook, invested $300,000 in sp0n and recruited several engineers. Frame had the idea for Citizen when "looking at the backs of former tenements in Lower Manhattan. He thought about the modern, invisible signals of wireless calls, Wi-Fi and police radio darting through the 19th-century buildings." Vigilante was backed by a seed round of $1 million, led by Founders Fund.

The Vigilante app was released to New York City, in the App Store on October 26, 2016. The app, which showed users where crime was occurring in real time, went viral. It proved controversial when its marketing videos seemed to encourage user vigilantism, with several publications also raising concerns about racial profiling and harassment. Within 48 hours of its App Store launch, Apple pulled the app due to safety concerns. sp0n subsequently asserted it was working with Apple to "resolve the issue" and still planned on shipping an Android version.

=== Rebrand as Citizen ===
With New York City as its first test market, sp0n relaunched the app in March 2017 as Citizen for iOS and Android. The app increased its safety messaging to discourage users from approaching or interfering with crime scenes. While developing the new iteration, the company had consulted New York city officials, police, public safety experts, and "civil rights leaders—among others" on making it safe to use. Citizen only sent alerts deemed a threat to "public safety," omitting calls about suspicious people, suspicious bags, and drug incidents. According to the company at the time, "there are about 10,000 911 calls per day in New York City. We include 300–400 on average." Citizen received a hostile reaction from critics. They noted that the livestreaming option could tempt people to approach danger or spread unjustified panics. In May 2017, the company said that the app had been downloaded 34,000 times in New York City over the prior few months. In September 2017, sp0n announced that it had raised $12.2 million in Series A funding. The round was led by Sequoia Capital, and the app was valued at $31 million. Other investors included RRE Ventures, Slow Ventures, and Lux Capital. At the time, Citizen had around 20 employees monitoring police and fire calls in all of New York's five boroughs full time, and had around 120,000 users in New York. On September 19, 2017, the app expanded into San Francisco, California, soon after spreading service to the larger Bay Area.

In 2018 and 2019, the app began receiving attention in the press, in particular after alerting a New York school principal of a nearby terrorist attack before the event reached the news. According to CNN, during a fire in 2018 at Trump Tower, "34 simultaneous users live streamed on the app as the fire blazed," and during a shooting at YouTube's headquarters in April 2018, "some of the earliest details were from Citizen livestreams." The Citizen app was also used to livestream a lock-down at Balboa High School in San Francisco in August 2018 and, according to CNN, the app "gained attention after major incidents including an evacuation of CNN's headquarters in December 2018 and a truck attack on New York's West Side." In February 2018, Citizen reported having 250,000 monthly active users, and that overall it had sent a total of 26.5 million notifications.

Although Citizen had "no formal relationships with any municipalities, as of February 2019, downloading the app was mandatory for New York firefighters. The app launched in Baltimore, Maryland in February 2019 after ongoing conversations with elected officials and members of the Baltimore City Council On March 12, 2019, the app launched in Los Angeles, followed by Philadelphia, Pennsylvania, its fifth market. The app was met with mixed reaction from police departments, with CNN writing in March 2019 that "since it relaunched as Citizen in 2017, many of the early fears about the app have faded." Police departments that CNN Business reached out to for comment were "neutral about the app," including San Francisco and Baltimore. Citizen asserted that emergency room doctors used Citizen to anticipate incoming patients, while news organizations scouted the app for breaking stories.

In June 2019, Bloomberg reported that around one million people had downloaded the app in New York City, and that the app consistently ranked in the top ten news apps in the App Store, "often higher than CNN, Buzz Feed, The New York Times and Google News." William Bratton, who had been opposed to the app in 2016 as New York City Police Commissioner, around that time joined Citizen's board of directors. In July 2019, Citizen sent out two million notifications per day and was the tenth most downloaded news app for iPhones, according to The New Yorker. At the time, Citizen had 70 full time employees, including 38 analysts, with Citizen's artificial intelligence software allowing a single person to cover incidents across multiple cities. After raising $27 million in early 2019, in a funding round led by 8VC, by July 2019 the company had raised a total of $40 million. sp0n had not revealed a revenue model, but did state that Citizen would not make profits from ads or share user information. In 2019, an update required continuous location tracking to access the app, resulting in controversy. Citizen in response modified the app to allow users to configure privacy settings.

=== 2020s ===
In February 2020, Citizen reported having 225,000 local users in Philadelphia, continuing to increase the saturation of surveillance in larger cities and potentially specific neighborhoods.

The Wall Street Journal, in early June 2020, wrote that Citizen had become a "key tool during protests" after the police murder of George Floyd in Minneapolis. Recode wrote that Citizen was experiencing a "surprising renaissance as an organizing and broadcasting tool for activists", with protestors using it to monitor protest developments, police responses, and curfews. Fast Company described it as, "on Citizen, users can see a map of exactly where people are gathering, view raw video of demonstrations in progress, look for signs of rioting and looting, and air out their feelings in comments sections."

Some critics noted that Citizen's collection of protest videos tied to identifying information could potentially be used by government entities. In response, Citizen said it only gives user data to law enforcement "in response to valid subpoenas, court orders, or search warrants," but when users delete content, the app "loses access within 30 days", though law enforcement agencies can undertake to preserve it longer. Citizen became the top-ranked news app on the Apple chart on June 3, 2020, up from 744th, and surpassing Twitter, CNN, and Fox News. During the first week of June, around 600,000 news users signed up to Citizen.

In January 2021, Axios reported that Citizen had raised $73 million in new funding, with Greycroft as a new investor. The round included $20 million from Goodwater Capital in March 2020.

In March 2021, Citizen added "activity notifications, private messaging, and the ability to add friends. Around the same time, Citizen reintroduced a feature that lets users create their own incident alerts, instead of waiting for the incident to show up after it's been broadcast on a scanner and added to the app by Citizen's employees." In April, Citizen began sending Magic Moments notifications, "videos that recall incidents where Citizen users came to the rescue or prevented themselves and others from falling victim to an awful tragedy."

In May 2021, Citizen deployed a vehicle and private security personnel in Los Angeles with the intention of providing on-demand private security. In 2022, Citizen planned to trial a version of its private security service in Chicago, with assistance from the company Securitas.

In January 2022, Citizen made its first acquisition, purchasing the disaster-prep app Harbor. Harbor's weather mapping and risk prediction will be incorporated into the Citizen app, but it will continue to operate independently.

In March 2023, The Financial Times reported that early backer Sequoia Capital had resigned its board seat and declined to join Citizen’s next funding round, a sign of investor concern as the company sought fresh capital.

In April 2025, public‑safety technology firm Axon announced a partnership that integrates Citizen with the Axon Fusus real‑time crime‑center platform, allowing law‑enforcement agencies to view live Citizen videos and push verified alerts directly to app users.

== Features ==
=== Alerts and incidents ===
The Citizen app generates alerts sourced from fire, emergency medical services, and 911 calls, with Citizen employees using Citizen software to monitor publicly available information. Specifically, the app maintains a network of their proprietary R1 radios across multiple cities, which monitor "up to 900 public radio channels across a city's first responder network: state and local police, fire and EMS, transit and airport security." Citizen digitizes the reports using a custom artificial intelligence system, which are in turn interpreted by employees. If users are near the report, they receive a push notification on their phone that geolocates the event, as a dot. According to Forbes, the alerts "contain a brief description, exact address and distance from the user. With a tap, the notification expands to a street map, more detail, plus user comments." With more detail added as incidents progress, the alerts include live video. The home screen organizes nearby incidents by distance and recency, and Citizen also allows users to cut off alerts for anything but major events. Some alerts are for non-emergencies, such as large crowds or blocked-off streets.

The company has employees who screen 911 communications, with the main criteria for inclusion being that the information "needs to pose a public safety concern." The operations team includes journalists and former first responders, who are "trained to make on-the-fly decisions about what goes into the app based on complex criteria." By policy, incidents such as suspicious persons, commercial burglaries, minor car collisions, and medical issues are not included; these changes were largely as a reaction from fears that Vigilante, Citizen's original form, would encourage over-reporting innocent people as suspicious.

=== User content ===
To "ensure there are no graphic images," Citizen's moderators review all uploaded photos and videos, filtering graphic images and comments that are derogatory, racist, or explicit." For users close to an incident, a "record" button appears on screen to allow live-streaming. Users are not paid for videos, "nor are videos gamified with rankings or 'likes'." By March 2019, around 100,000 live videos had been recorded using the app. The New York Times reported that Citizen footage was provided to television stations for free, with more than 100 of those videos being used on local news broadcasts on a weekly basis.

=== SafePass ===
In March 2020, Citizen introduced a digital contact tracing system, though launch was delayed for months while Frame awaited Apple's approval, due to concerns that combined use of GPS and Bluetooth may violate user privacy; a compromise was reached by launching the additional SafePass app. That August 13, SafePass went public, and was featured on Emily Chang's Bloomberg Technology show. With 700,000 people having tested the product and 10,000 COVID-19 test results reported in that test group, Citizen called it "the largest private contact-tracing network." It was made available on the App Store and Google Play, with functionality on both iOS and Android.

On August 17, 2020, Stockton, California and San Joaquin County partnered with Citizen on promoting SafePass. Stockton Mayor Michael Tubbs stated that he was "hoping to get as many of the about 750,000 county residents as possible signed up as soon as possible in order to reach critical mass." In September 2020, Los Angeles County, including Los Angeles, Long Beach, and Pasadena, announced that it was partnering with SafePass to "bolster the county's contact tracing initiative and receive info on an opt-in basis." Frame stated that about 1 million of the county's 10 million citizens already used Citizen, with 3.5% having previously opted into SafePass during a limited beta release.

=== OnAir ===
In April 2021, Citizen debuted OnAir, a cable news-style livestream where a host will discuss ongoing events and conduct interviews on the scene of an event. A month later, a livestream with over 1 million views started a search in California, offering a $30,000 reward for information that led to a specific person's arrest, claiming they were an arsonist responsible for the Palisades Fire. While police were indeed looking for this person, they were innocent, and another person was since arrested. A Citizen spokesperson called the incident "a mistake we are taking very seriously."

=== Citizen Protect ===
In August 2021, Citizen released the subscription security feature Protect. Citizen's first paid feature, USA Today says it "lets users contact virtual agents for help if they feel they're in danger." The feature had earlier been beta-tested on 100,000 users. As of January 26, 2022, Protect had over 100,000 subscribers.

== Controversies ==
Early in the investigation of the 2021 Palisades Fire it was ruled by investigators that the fire had likely been intentionally set. Within hours of this announcement, Citizen sent out notifications to 860,000 Los Angeles users that included a photograph of a man, along with unsubstantiated claims that the man in question was the potential arsonist who caused the fire. Citizen also offered a reward of $30,000 to anyone who could provide information leading to an arrest. Soon after, the misinformed campaign to find the purported suspect spread online and many tips were brought forth to Los Angeles Police Department investigators. The man was identified as Devin Hilton and was obtained for questioning by investigators, but he was soon ruled out as the suspected arsonist due to a substantial lack of evidence connecting him to the fire.

Citizen later admitted to the mistake stating, "We publicly posted the photo and offered a cash reward for information without formal coordination with the appropriate agencies. Once we realized this error, we immediately retracted the photo and reward offer. We are actively working to improve our internal processes to ensure this does not occur again. This was a mistake we are taking very seriously."

== See also ==
- List of photo and video apps
- Messaging apps
- Neighbors (app)
- Nextdoor
