= Information systems technician =

An information systems technician is a technician whose responsibility is maintaining communications and computer systems.

== Description ==
Most information systems technicians operate and maintain information systems, facilitating system utilization. In many companies, these technicians assemble data sets and other details needed to build databases. This includes data management, procedure writing, writing job setup instructions, and performing program librarian functions. Information systems technicians assist in designing and coordinating the development of integrated information system databases. Information systems technicians also help maintain Internet and Intranet websites. They decide how information is presented and create digital multimedia and presentation using software and related equipment.

Information systems technicians install and maintain multi-platform networking computer environments, a variety of data networks, and a diverse set of telecommunications infrastructures. Information systems technicians schedule information gathering for content in a multiple system environment. Information systems technicians are responsible for the operation, programming, and configuration of many pieces of electronics, hardware and software. ITs often are also tasked to investigate, troubleshoot, and resolve end-user problems. Information systems technicians conduct ongoing assessments of short and long-term hardware and software needs for companies, developing, testing, and implementing new and revised programs.

Information systems technicians cooperate with other staff to inventory, maintain and manage computer and communication systems. Information systems technicians provide communication links and connectivity to the department in an organization, serving to equipment modification and installation tasks. This includes:

- local area networks : computer network covering a local area, like a home, office or small group of buildings such as a college.
- wide area networks : computer network covering a wide geographical area, involving a vast array of computers.
- minicomputer systems : multi-user computers which make up the middle range of the computing spectrum, usually single-user systems (such as personal computers).
- Macro-computer systems : Usually large multi-user systems (such as mainframe computers) for bulk data processing such as censuses, industry/consumer statistics, ERP, and bank transaction processing.
- associated peripheral devices

Additionally, Information systems technicians can conduct training and provide technical support to end-users, providing this for a departments (sometimes across multiple organizations).

== See also ==
- Computer repair technician
