= Palisades Fire (2021) =

2021 wildfire in Southern California

- Part of the 2021 California wildfires
- Date: May 14, 2021 –; May 26, 2021; (13 days)
- Location: Pacific Palisades, Los Angeles, California
- Coordinates: 34.079046°N 118.558938°W

Statistics
- Burned area: 1,202 acres (486 ha)

Impacts
- Injuries: 1 firefighter

Ignition
- Cause: Arson

Map
- Location in Southern California

Location of Palisades Fire

The Palisades Fire was a wildfire that burned in Topanga State Park, in the Pacific Palisades neighborhood of the city of Los Angeles, California on May 14, 2021. The fire burned a total of 1,202 acres (486 ha) and was fully contained on May 26, 2021.

== Progression ==
At around 10:00 PM PST on Friday, May 14, 2021, the Palisades Fire was first reported on the 1800 block of North Michael Lane. Throughout that night, the fire burned between 10 and 15 acres as helicopters and fire crews were quickly brought in to suppress the brush fire. The fire, which had been named the Palisades Fire due to its proximity to the Pacific Palisades neighborhood, burned in unseasonably dry chaparral that had not been burned in a significant fire within the 50 to 60 years, despite the presence of a marine layer over the area.

Early in the afternoon of Saturday, May 15, after some containment was established, a spot fire was observed expanding far outside the area of the original fire footprint. This spot fire soon became the main body of the fire, expanding in multiple directions into a conflagration of more than 100 acres . By the evening of the 15th, the fire was approximately 750 acres, and containment dropped to 0%. Mandatory evacuation orders were put in place for approximately 1,000 residents east of Topanga Canyon Boulevard, between the Community House and View Ridge Road, as well as north of Entrada, south of Oakwood Drive and east of Henry Ridge Motorway.

By the night of Sunday, May 16, the fire was estimated to have burned about 1,325 acres. On the morning of Monday, May 17, the area of the fire was reassessed at 1,158 acres due to more accurate mapping of the fire perimeter. Several hillside residential areas in Topanga Canyon were evacuated, and Topanga Canyon Boulevard was shut down. Over the course of the day, containment grew to 23%. At 6:00 PM PDT on May 17, all evacuations were lifted.

The Palisades Fire was 100% contained by 6:00 PM on Monday, May 26, 2021.

=== Cause ===
The cause of the fire is believed to be arson, and one suspect was detained, but later released. The main suspect was later identified as 48-year-old man Ramon Santos Rodriguez.

== Failed Citizen app manhunt ==
Early in the initial investigation as to the cause of the fire—while efforts to contain the still active blaze were underway—it was quickly ruled by investigators that the fire had likely been intentionally set. Within hours of this, the privately owned app Citizen, which is a mobile app that sends users location-based safety alerts in real time, sent out notifications to 860,000 Los Angeles users that included a photograph of a man, along with unsubstantiated claims that the man in question was the potential arsonist who caused the Palisades Fire. Citizen also offered a reward of $30,000 to anyone who could provide information leading to an arrest. Soon after, the misinformed campaign to find the purported suspect spread online and many tips were brought forth to LAPD investigators. The man was identified as Devin Hilton and was obtained for questioning by investigators, but he was soon ruled out as the suspected arsonist due to a substantial lack of evidence connecting him to the fire.

Comedian and media figure Kathy Griffin condemned the motion from Citizen, tweeting "OK, I’ve turned against the Citizen app. The hosts are offering a $30K reward for completely unsubstantiated evidence regarding a homeless guy who they think started the (fire). Now people are trying to hunt him down. No proof it was even arson much less this guy. Gross." The company later admitted to the mistake stating, "We publicly posted the photo and offered a cash reward for information without formal coordination with the appropriate agencies. Once we realized this error, we immediately retracted the photo and reward offer. We are actively working to improve our internal processes to ensure this does not occur again. This was a mistake we are taking very seriously."

== See also ==
- 2021 California wildfires
- List of California wildfires
