= Neighbors (app) =

Hyperlocal social network

- Developer: Ring LLC
- Operating system: Android, iOS
- License: Freeware

Neighbors by Ring, also known as simply Neighbors, is a hyperlocal social networking app owned by Ring LLC, a subsidiary of Amazon.com, Inc.

The app allows users to anonymously discuss crime and public safety issues within their local community. It integrates with Ring's smart doorbell and surveillance camera products, allowing users to share photos and video clips from the devices' cameras to accompany their posts. The app is also used as part of partnerships between Ring and local law enforcement agencies, who can make verified public service posts on the service, and use an online portal to collect footage posted on Neighbors to assist in investigations.

== Usage ==
The app displays posts and notifications that fall within a five-mile (8 km) radius of the user's home address. Users can report on news and events within their neighborhood, as well as share photos and video. Users can comment on these reports in order to provide additional information. Unlike competing services such as Nextdoor, the service focuses exclusively on public safety, and posts are moderated to remove off-topic content.

Verified law enforcement agencies can post public bulletins on Neighbors to request assistance for investigations, such as locating a missing person or a suspect in a crime. Members of police departments can request access to the "Neighbors Portal" to collect publicly-posted multimedia from Neighbors to assist in investigations: a case number is required, but no evidence is needed. Up to 12 hours of footage from within the past 45 days can be collected, within a maximum area of 0.5 square miles. Users are automatically notified and asked for permission for footage to be released.

== Reception ==
Neighbors has received criticism over Ring's partnerships with law enforcement agencies. The Electronic Frontier Foundation stated that apps such as Neighbors "facilitate reporting of so-called 'suspicious' behavior that really amounts to racial profiling." Fight for the Future has considered Ring and Neighbors to be a private surveillance network, backed by partnerships with law enforcement that "undermine our democratic process and basic civil liberties".

== See also ==
- Nextdoor
