= 3-pronged parts retriever =

Tool used by computer technicians to retrieve screws

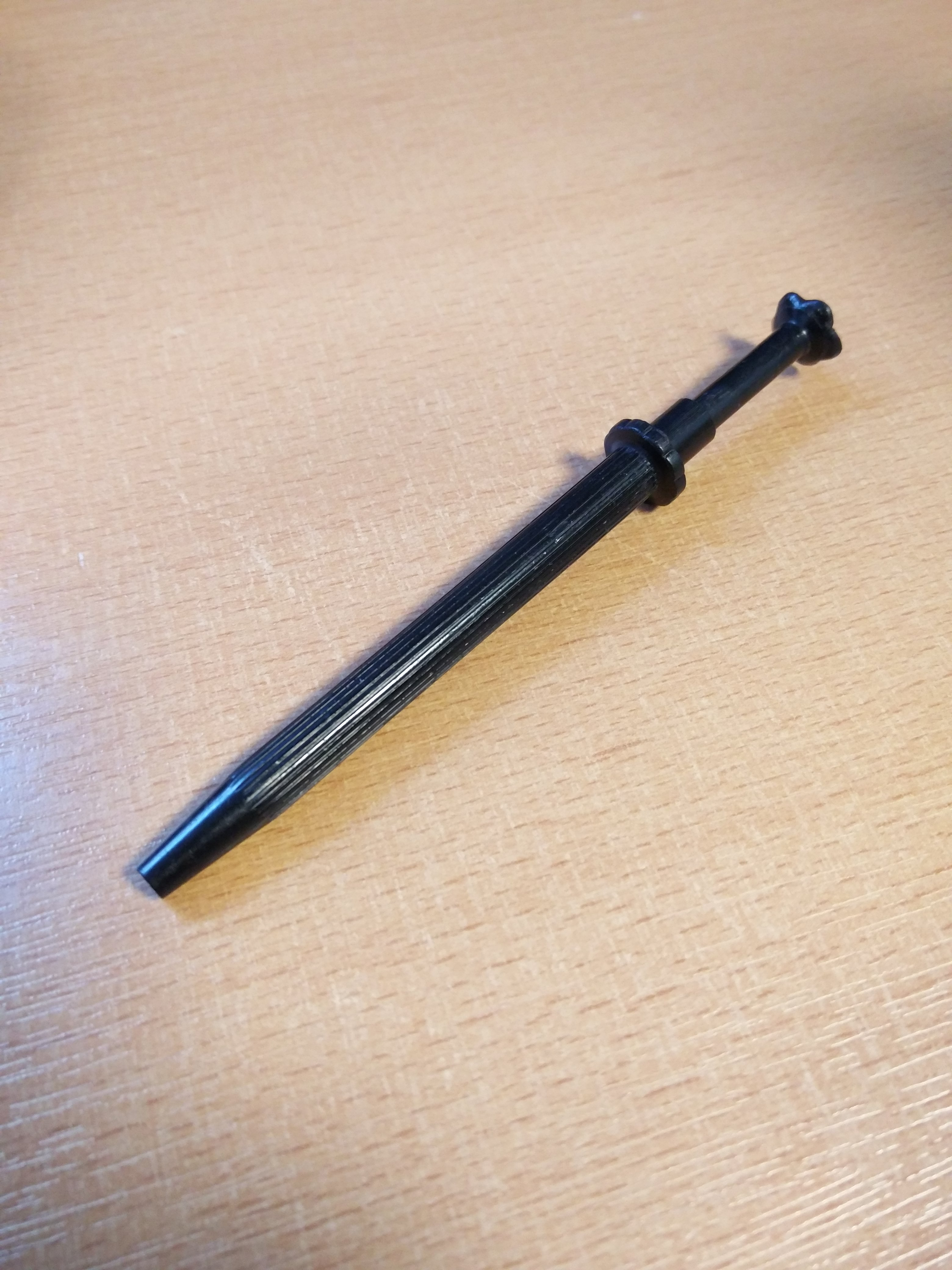

A 3-pronged parts retriever, also known as a Pearl-Catcher, is a tool used by computer technicians.

== Design ==
By pressing the end of it, the user allows the teeth to open up and by releasing their hold, the teeth will grab whatever object is below the grabber.
