= Solenoid bolt =

Electronic-mechanical locking mechanism

A solenoid bolt is a type of electronic-mechanical locking mechanism. This type of lock is characterized by the use of a solenoid to throw the bolt. Sophisticated solenoid bolt locks may use microprocessors to perform voltage regulation, reduce power consumption, and/or provide access control. Depending on the strength of the solenoid, some models can provide a holding force on the order of 1000 kg. A solenoid bolt can be designed either to fail open (the lock opens on power loss) or to fail closed (the device is locked upon power loss). Some models may be suitable for high-security sites.
