= Smart lock =

Electromechanical lock

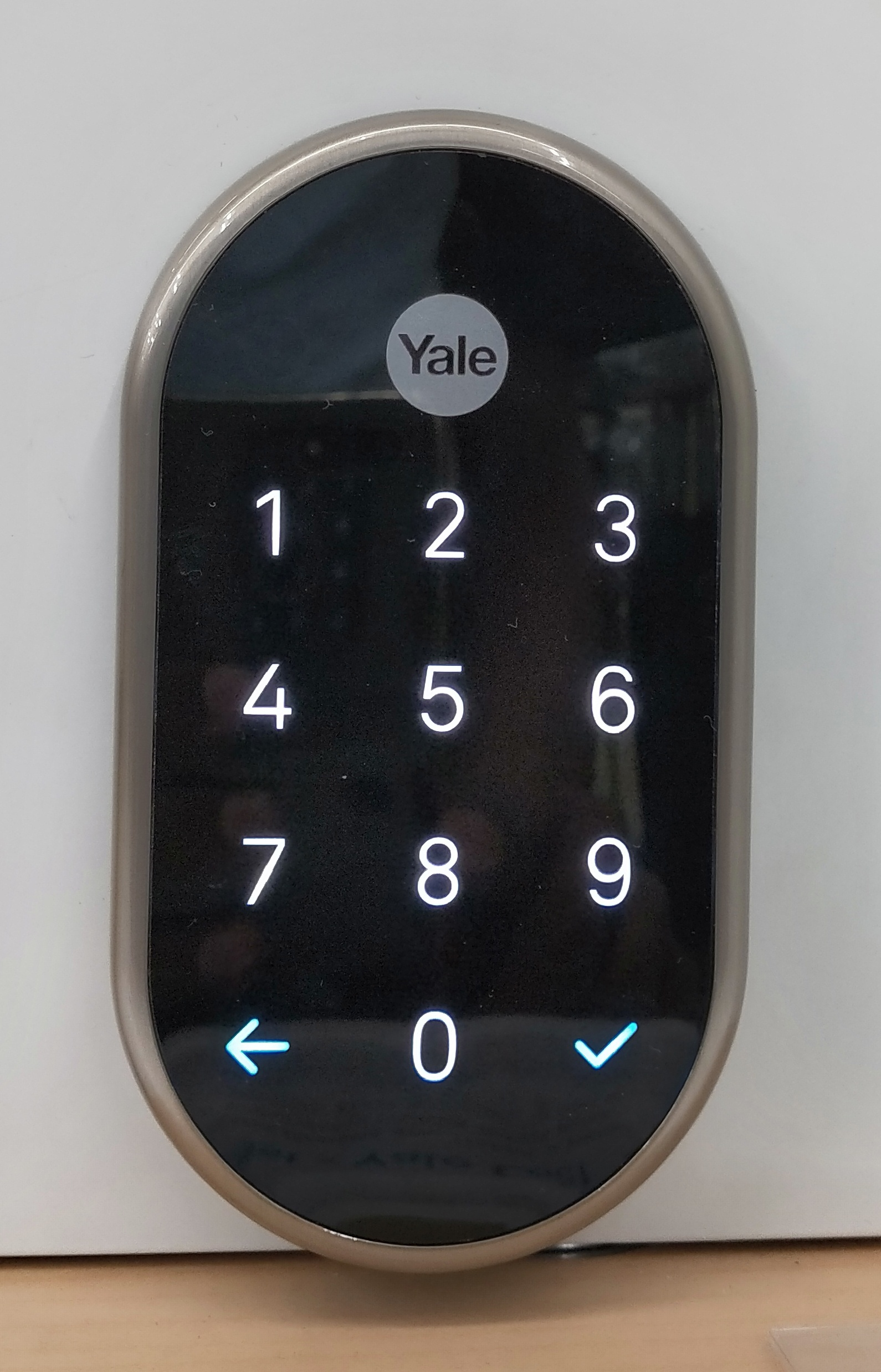
Electronic keypad lock

A smart lock is an electromechanical lock that is designed to perform locking and unlocking operations on a door when it receives a prompt via an electronic keypad, biometric sensor, access card, Bluetooth, or Wi-FI from a registered mobile device. These locks are called smart locks because they use advanced technology and Internet communication to enable easier access for users and enhanced security from intruders. The main components of the smart lock include the physical lock, the key (which can be electronic, digitally encrypted, or a virtual key to provide keyless entry), a secure Bluetooth or Wi-Fi connection, and a management mobile app. Smart locks may also monitor access and send alerts in response to the different events it monitors, as well as other critical events related to the status of the device. Smart locks can be considered part of a smart home.

Most smart locks are installed on mechanical locks (simple types of locks, including deadbolts) and they physically upgrade the ordinary lock. Recently, smart locking controllers have also appeared at the market.

Smart locks, like the traditional locks, need two main parts to work: the lock and the key. In the case of these electronic locks, the key is not a physical key but a smartphone or a special key fob or keycard configured explicitly for this purpose which wirelessly performs the authentication needed to automatically unlock the door

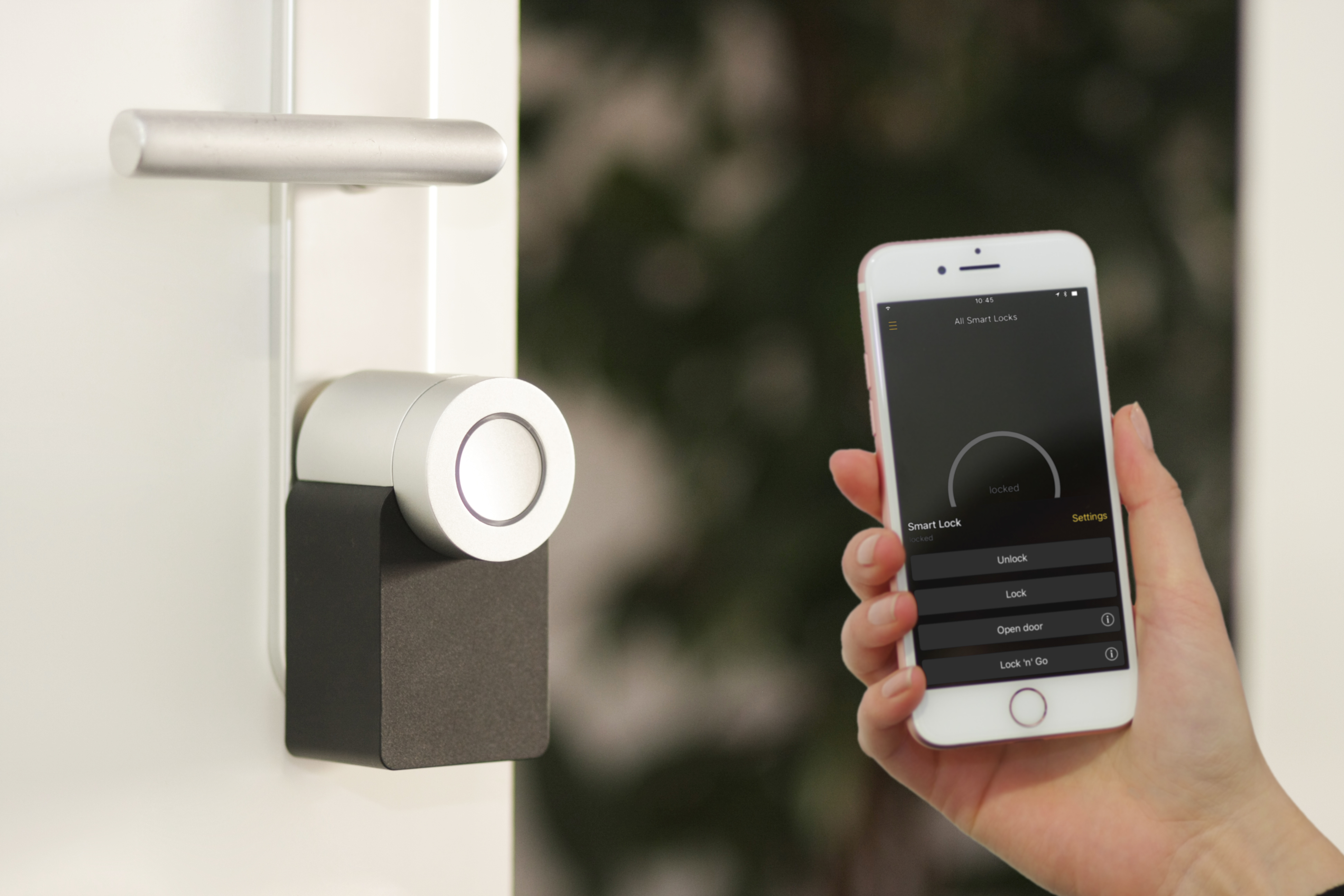
Smart lock controlled by a phone app

Smart locks allow users to grant access to a third party by means of a virtual key. This key can be sent to the recipient smartphone over standard messaging protocols such as e-mail or SMS, or via a dedicated application. Once this key is received, the recipient will be able to unlock the smart lock using their mobile device during the timeframe previously specified by the sender.

Certain smart locks include a built-in Wi-Fi connection that allows for monitoring features such as access notifications or cameras to show the person requesting access. Some smart locks work with a smart doorbell to allow the user to see who and when someone is at a door. Many smart locks now also feature biometric features, such as fingerprint sensors. Biometrics are becoming increasingly popular because they offer more security than passwords alone. This is because they use unique physical characteristics rather than stored information.

Smart locks may use Bluetooth Low Energy and SSL to communicate, encrypting communications using 128/256-bit AES.

== Industry smart lock ==
Industrial smart locks (passive electronic lock) are a branch of the smart lock field. They are an iterative product of mechanical locks like smart locks. However, the application areas of industrial smart locks are not smart homes, but fields that have extremely high requirements for key management, such as communications, power utilities, water utilities, public safety, transportation, data centers, etc.

Industry smart locks mainly have three components: locks and keys, and management systems. Similarly, the key is no longer a physical key, but a special electronic key. When unlocking, the unlocking authority needs to be assigned before. Through the management system, the administrator needs to set the user, unlock date and time period for the key. Whenever the user unlocks or locks the lock, the unlock record will be saved in the key. The unlocking record can be tracked through the management software.

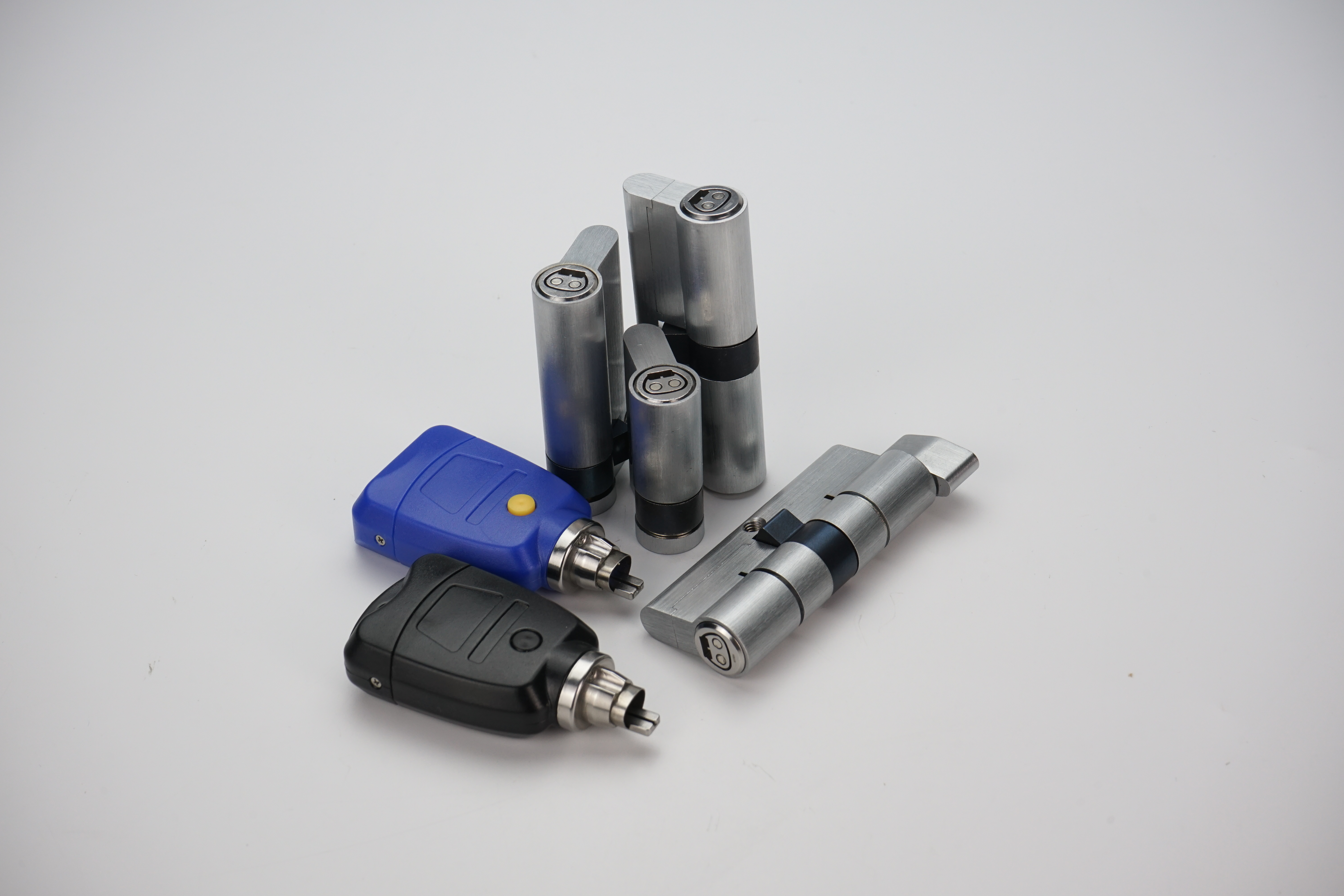
Industry smart lock cylinder (passive electronic cylinder lock)

At the same time, industry smart locks can also remotely assign permissions through a mobile app.

== Security ==
Due to the inherent complexity of digital and wireless technologies, it can be difficult for the end user to confirm or refute the security claims of various product offerings on the market. The devices may also gather personal information; representations by the vendors involved concerning the care and handling of this information is also difficult for the end user to verify.

== See also ==
- Door loop, a method for providing electric cabling to a door
