= Smart doorbell =

Internet-connected doorbell

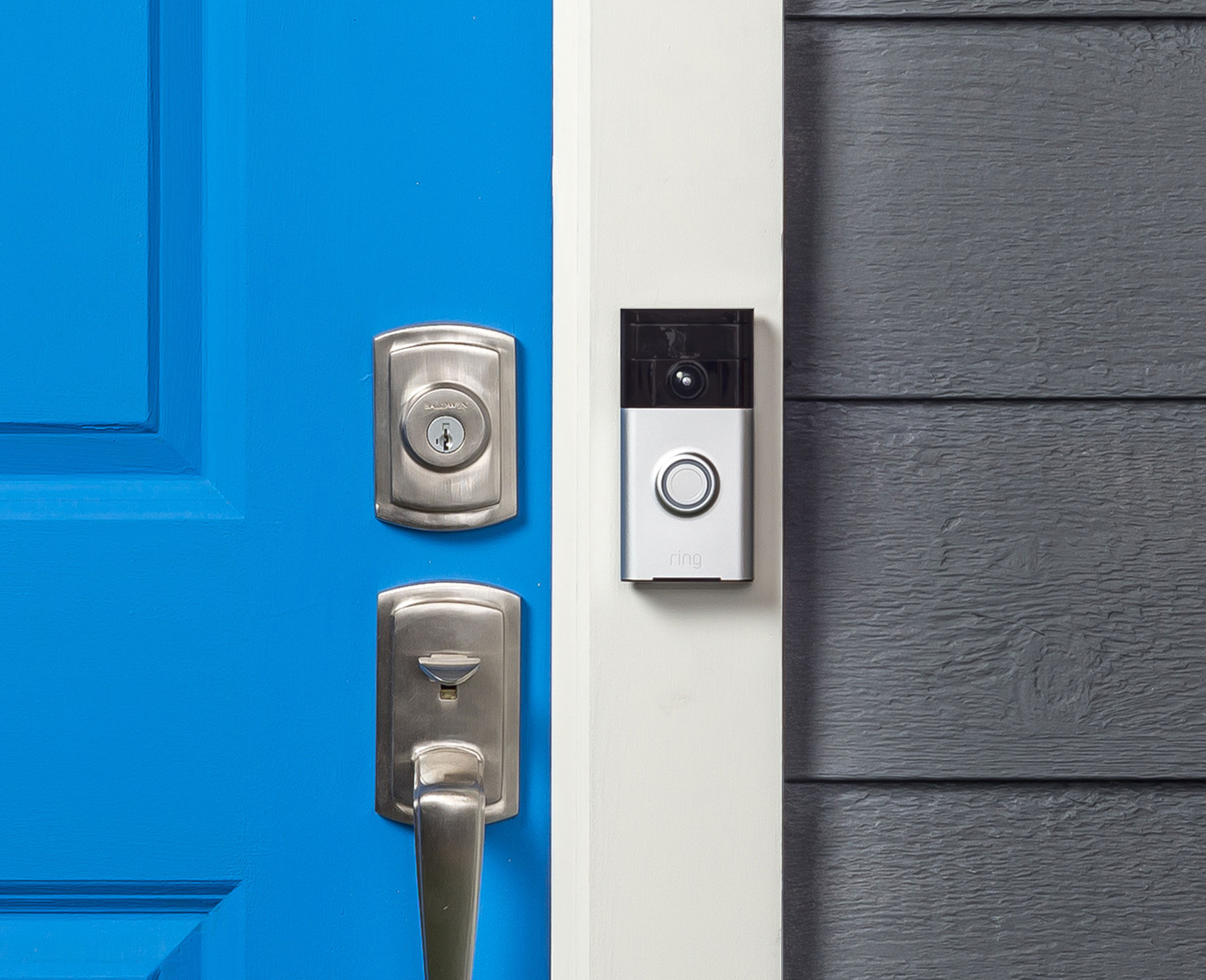
The first-generation Ring video doorbell attached next to the front door of a house.

A smart doorbell is an internet-connected doorbell that notifies the home owner on their device (smartphone or any other gadget) when a visitor arrives at the door. It activates when the visitor presses the button of the doorbell, or alternatively, when the doorbell senses a visitor with its built-in motion sensors. The smart doorbell lets the home owner use a smartphone app to watch and talk with the visitor by using the doorbell's built-in high-definition infrared camera and microphone. They can be either battery operated or wired. Some smart doorbells also allow the user to open the door remotely using a smart lock.

== History ==
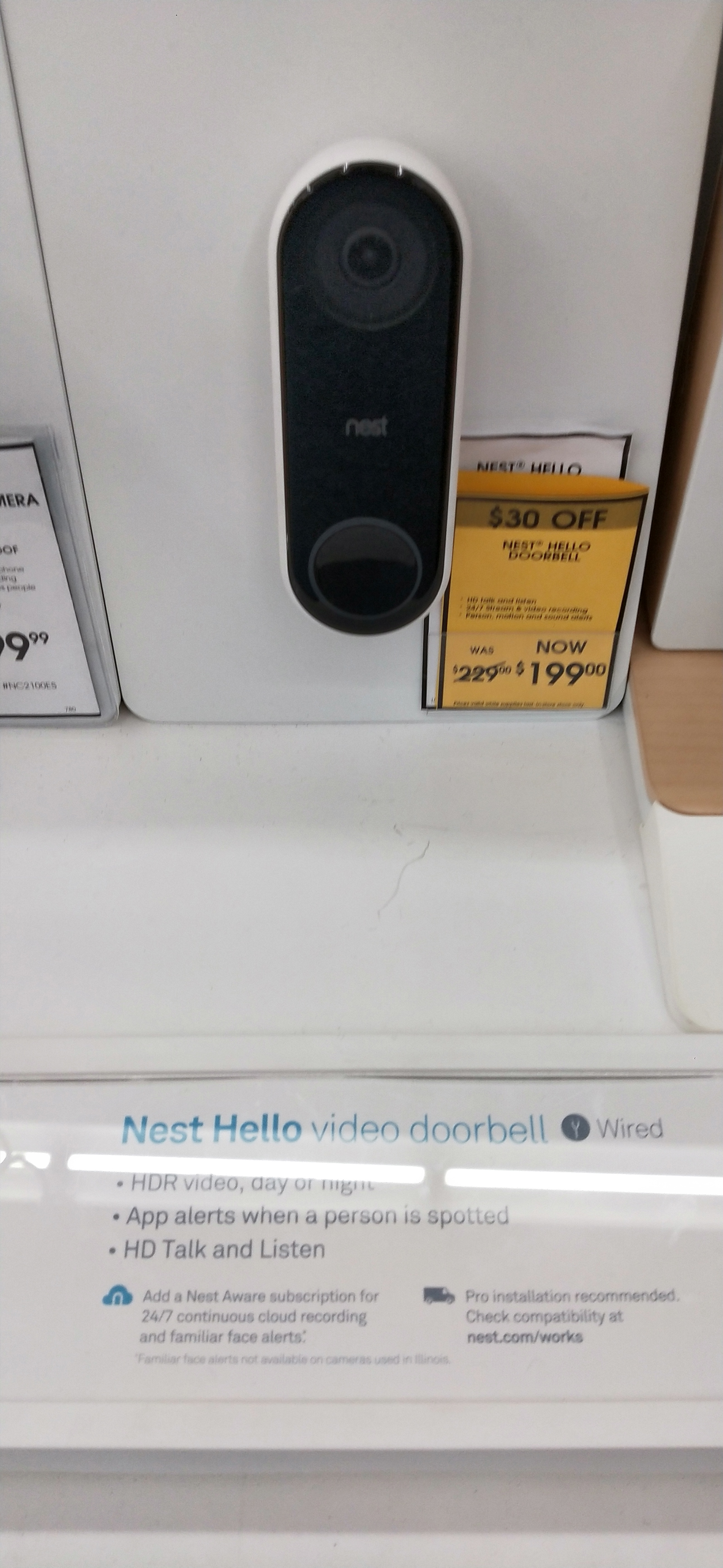
Nest Hello

One of the earliest smart doorbells that entered to the market is the Ring Video Doorbell which was created by entrepreneur Jamie Siminoff in 2013. Since then, several more smart doorbells have been introduced to the market, some of them with additional, unique features. Another major one is Nest Hello.

== Privacy issues ==
Concerns regarding the security of the smart doorbells have been raised. Researchers at Pen Test Partners in the UK have analyzed the Ring smart doorbell and concluded that it is possible for an attacker to gain access to the homeowner's wireless network by unscrewing the Ring, pressing the setup button and accessing the configuration URL. In another security issue that had been observed, a mix-up of two databases allowed some users of the Ring smart doorbell to view live footage from complete strangers' front porches.

== See also ==
- Door loop, a method for providing electric cabling to a door
- Electronic lock
- Home automation
- Intercom
- Internet of things
- Smart, connected products
