= Nextdoor =

Hyperlocal social networking service for neighborhoods

Nextdoor Holdings, Inc.

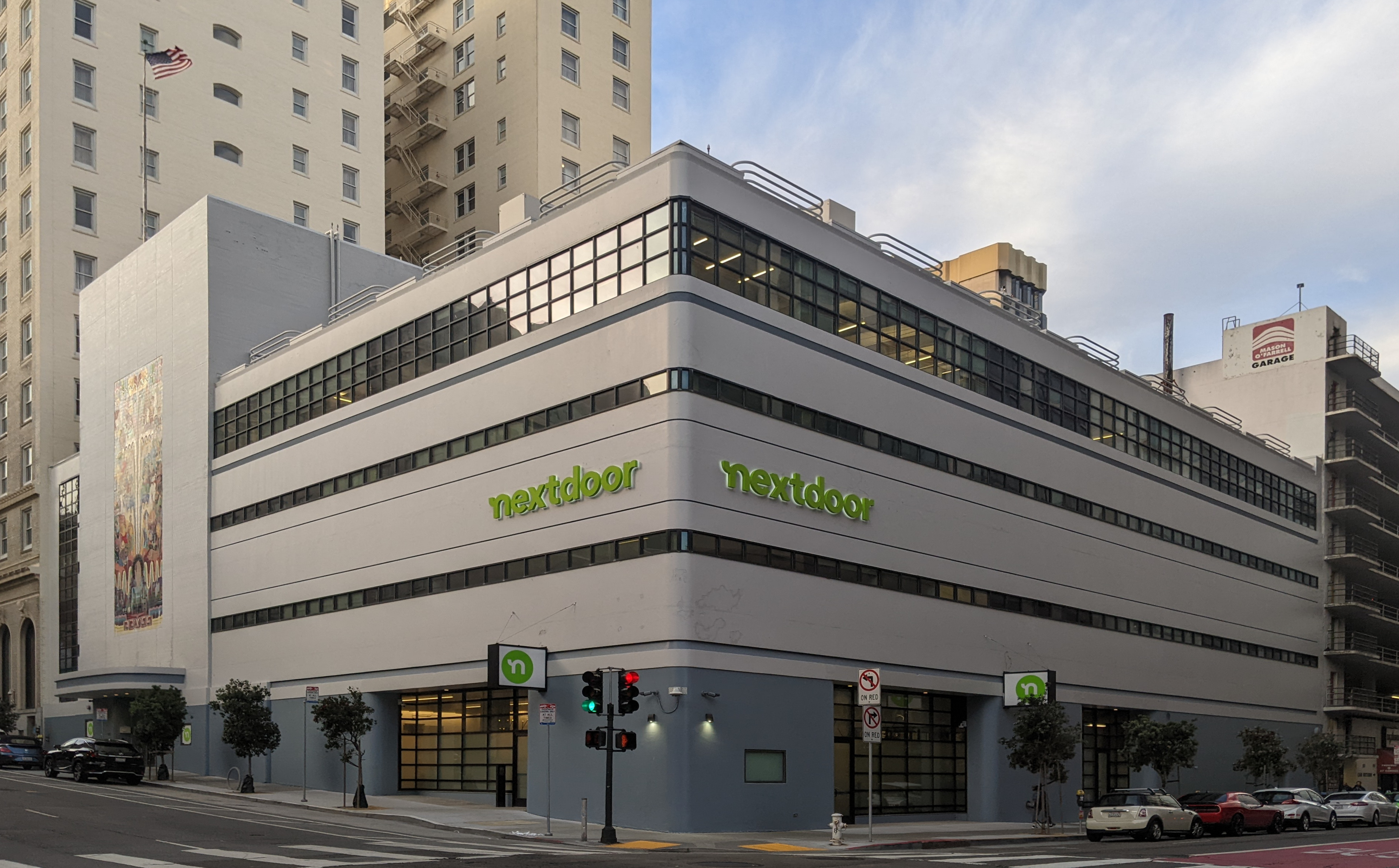
- Headquarters in San Francisco in 2022
- Type: Public
- Traded as: NYSE: NXDR
- Founded: 2008; 18 years ago
- Founders: Nirav Tolia; Prakash Janakiraman; David Wiesen; Sarah Leary
- Headquarters: San Francisco, California, US
- Area served: Australia, Canada, Denmark, France, Germany, Italy, Netherlands, Spain, Sweden, UK, US
- Key people: Nirav Tolia (CEO)
- Revenue: ▲US$218 million (2023)
- Operating income: ▼ −US$172 million (2023)
- Net income: ▼ −US$148 million (2023)
- Total assets: ▼US$655 million (2023)
- Total equity: ▼US$559 million (2023)
- Number of employees: 594 (2023)
- Website: nextdoor.com

Nextdoor Holdings, Inc. is an American company that operates a hyperlocal social networking service for neighborhoods. The company was founded in 2008 and is based in San Francisco, California. Nextdoor launched in the United States in October 2011. It is available in eleven countries as of May 2023. In 2024, the company claimed to have 88 million "neighbors" as members. By June 30, 2026, the company reported 110 million "neighbors" as members.

Users of Nextdoor are required to submit their legal names and addresses to the website.

== History ==
Nirav Tolia, Sarah Leary, Prakash Janakiraman and David Wiesen co-founded Nextdoor in 2008. Tolia had previously helped start Epinions. Early investors included Benchmark Capital, Shasta Ventures, and Rich Barton. The concept and patents that Nextdoor is based on were invented by "FatDoor" CEO Raj Abhyanker in 2006. Abhyanker pitched Benchmark Capital on Nextdoor in 2007. Nirav Tolia worked at Benchmark Capital as Entrepreneur in Residence at that time.

As of February 2014, Nextdoor had 80 to 100 employees. In July 2012, Nextdoor raised US$18.6 million in venture capital funding. Dan Clancy (formerly of Google) joined Nextdoor in February 2014.

On May 14, 2014, Nirav Tolia, then-CEO of Nextdoor, was charged with felony hit-and-run for allegedly fleeing a crash on Highway 101 in Brisbane, California, that left a woman injured. "It's ironic that the CEO of a company that is holding itself out as trying to promote neighborliness, crime watch and things like that flees the scene of an accident that he caused and doesn't bother to call 911 or stay around to exchange information or see if he caused any injuries," said the woman's attorney, Joseph Brent. On June 12, 2014, Tolia pled no contest and served 30 days of community service in lieu of jail time.

In February 2017, Nextdoor acquired the UK local social network service Streetlife in a "multimillion pound deal". Nextdoor's less stringent privacy and safety policies provoked concerns among some users of Streetlife—for example, full names and street addresses are visible to all members of a Nextdoor, but not Streetlife, neighbourhood—some reporting ensuing harm, such as abusive former partner finding out a woman's current address.

Advertising was added to the platform, including real estate advertising, in 2017. Advertising includes posts inside users' feeds about business services and products.

In July 2018, then-CEO co-founder Tolia announced plans to retire as chief executive officer (CEO), stating that he intended to become chair of the company's board following the transition. In October 2018, Square's former chief financial officer Sarah Friar became CEO, succeeding Tolia. Tolia subsequently retained his seat as a member of the company board of directors.

In 2019, Nextdoor acquired Hoodline, a local news aggregator that is considered Pink-slime Journalism. Later that year, HuffPost and Wired reported that Nextdoor paid a firm to improve its reputation by lobbying for changes to the Wikipedia articles on Nextdoor, NBC, and several other corporations.

In November 2021, Nextdoor became a publicly traded company.

In February 2024, Sarah Friar stepped down as CEO and Tolia resumed the role. In March 2024, Tolia was accused of sexual harassment by a former employee.

== Usage ==
Typical platform uses include neighbors reporting on news and events in their "neighborhood" and members asking each other for local service-provider recommendations. The first "neighborhood" boundaries were initially established with Maponics, a provider of geographical information. "Founding" members of neighborhoods can also determine the name of the neighborhood and its boundaries, although Nextdoor retains the authority to change either of these. A member must attract a minimum of 10 households to establish a new "neighborhood", as of November 2016. According to the platform's rules, members whose addresses fall outside the boundaries of existing neighborhoods can establish their own neighborhoods.

=== Local information ===
While allowing for "civil debate", the platform prohibits canvassing for votes on forums. The service does, however allow separate forums just for political discussions. According to The New York Times, these discussions are "separated from [a user's regular] neighborhood feeds". The company had established these separate forums in 12 markets by 2018.

In a 2014 study of three neighborhoods in Atlanta, researchers from the Georgia Institute of Technology found that Nextdoor users from the study tended to be highly engaged with their respective neighborhoods outside of their participation on Nextdoor. For these users, Nextdoor provided a means of communication with individuals in a geographic area, instead of the topic-specific focuses of mailing lists, Facebook groups, and Craigslist posts. Study participants described Nextdoor discussions as civil, and stated that the website's address verification requirement increases trust among users while also raising privacy concerns associated with disclosing one's location to the neighborhood.

=== Buy and sell goods ===
Nextdoor has a section called For Sale & Free for users to buy, sell, or give away items. The Marketplace is based on geographic location and no payments take place on the app. Since Nextdoor vets the identity of its users, facilitating pickup and payment of items has been considered more secure than platforms like Facebook Marketplace and Craigslist. In 2021, the network reported that one-fourth of items listed are free stuff.

=== Crime and safety ===
Users can post on Nextdoor about crime and safety in their community. Starting in 2015, media outlets have reported some Nextdoor users have been racially profiling people of color in neighborhoods across the United States. In 2016, Nextdoor announced that users would be asked to submit identifying characteristics other than race when posting warnings about individuals or events in the neighborhood.

Law enforcement officials in Oakland, California, who had generally embraced Nextdoor as a means to connect with local residents, were wary of being seen as endorsing or associating with a website that critics argue enables racial profiling. Nextdoor changed its user interface, saying the purpose was to make it harder for users to create race-based posts. After the change, the Oakland Police Department said the changes made Nextdoor "more helpful" to the police department's work. Cofounder Tolia claimed in a February 2017 interview with Wired that Nextdoor reduced racial profiling in its crime and safety reports by 75 percent through user interface changes. A BuzzFeed News investigation indicated that racial profiling of people of color was still prevalent on Nextdoor as of May 2017, and that anti-discrimination measures previously announced by Nextdoor and proposed by Nextdoor's community members were incompletely implemented in Nextdoor's website and apps.

The Atlantic discussed further concerns over hyperactive "crime and safety" sections of Seattle's private community pages on Nextdoor. According to The Atlantic, "Seattle Mayor Ed Murray derided an atmosphere of 'paranoid hysteria' he'd witnessed on the message boards of some of Seattle's more upscale neighborhoods." The mayor said on KUOW-FM, the local NPR affiliate, that Seattle's wealthiest areas are some of the most active communities on Nextdoor. "The neighborhoods where most of the social-media complaints are coming out of are not even the neighborhoods that have significant crime problems, which tend to be our communities of color in the south part of the city. If it's simply about creating a sense of paranoia or if it's about stigmatizing folks in our city that are struggling, then I have to think about why we're in that kind of partnership."

The Root described incidents in 2019 in which people of color and one transgender person claimed they were targeted by Nextdoor users with negative comments and "spook alerts" – racially charged accusations of criminal activity – when they were walking in their neighborhoods.

In June 2020, The Verge reported that "Nextdoor has struggled to shed its reputation as a 'snitch' app, used by white and wealthy users to racially profile their neighbors and report them to the police", an issue that New York Representative Alexandria Ocasio-Cortez termed the "Karen problem" in a rebuke of Nextdoor on Twitter. During the George Floyd protests, many members of the National Leads Forum – a community of Nextdoor moderators – criticized Nextdoor's support of the Black Lives Matter movement and expressed a preference for All Lives Matter, a slogan that signifies opposition to BLM. A number of Nextdoor users had their accounts suspended or their posts deleted by Nextdoor moderators after commenting in race-related discussions or mentioning BLM during the protests. On June 11, Nextdoor explicitly instructed its moderators to allow discussions on the Movement for Black Lives, including BLM. In a blog post, CEO Friar denounced "systemic racism in our nation" and pledged to provide its moderators with "resources and support". Subsequently, Nextdoor discontinued its "forward to police" feature, which had, since 2016, let users send posts directly to local law enforcement. The company said for several months it had been examining the feature as one aspect of its anti-racism efforts.

== Partnerships ==
=== Police departments ===
Nextdoor has invited police officers and government officials into its Public Agencies Advisory Council in exchange for a commitment to promote Nextdoor using blog posts and referrals. Members of the council participate in quarterly conference calls with Nextdoor employees and receive at least one trip to the company's headquarters in San Francisco, with all expenses reimbursed by Nextdoor. Nextdoor requires individuals who join the council to sign a non-disclosure agreement that restricts them from disclosing certain types of information about Nextdoor without the company's permission. Representatives of the American Civil Liberties Union and the Electronic Frontier Foundation expressed concerns about the lack of transparency associated with Nextdoor's use of non-disclosure agreements.

The police department in Seattle had been engaging with people through "town hall meetings" held on the platform, but in 2016 local journalist Erica C. Barnett reported the meeting's possible conflict with Washington's open meeting laws.

=== COVID-19 ===
Nextdoor partnered with the Centers for Disease Control and American Red Cross to help distribute information related to COVID-19 to local neighborhoods. Nextdoor also partnered with Walmart to allow users at risk of COVID-19 complications to request shopping assistance during the pandemic. Walmart locations and store hours were placed on a "Help Map" where users could post to offer help to others in their neighborhoods. Nextdoor reported an 80% increase in user engagement during March 2020, especially in areas most seriously affected by the virus.

=== Voting ===
Since 2018, Nextdoor has partnered with Vote.org to launch an interactive Vote Map during elections that mark local poll locations and allow users to share whether they have voted or plan to vote.

The company exchanges services with government agencies such as the California Secretary of State's office and the District of Columbia Board of Elections. These public agencies collect and present voter-education information, such as voting locations and voter registration deadlines. This is offered as a link in the Nextdoor platform for members in those neighborhoods.

=== Disaster relief ===
The platform reports increased activity during disasters. In May 2017, the company offered its services to the Federal Emergency Management Agency (FEMA), to facilitate the delivery of geographically targeted "emergency and disaster preparedness" alerts through the platform. A National Oceanic and Atmospheric Administration partnership allows Nextdoor to send out local-community alerts during extreme weather incidents. A study on the role of social media in disaster recovery following Hurricane Harvey revealed that communities active on Nextdoor were likely to recover at a rate faster than communities that were less active.

=== Local news ===
In July 2025, Nextdoor released the "new Nextdoor," redesigning the core product and announcing three new features: News, Alerts, and Ask. News brought professional local journalism alongside the platform's user-generated content, tailored to neighbor's locations. At launch, Nextdoor reported that it had partnered with over 3,500 local news outlets, with news stories reaching over 75% of its neighborhoods each week. Pew Research found that 33% of Americans regularly got news on Nextdoor in 2025 and Time awarded Nextdoor Local News a special mention as one of the Best Inventions of 2025.

== Marketing ==
Since at least 2019, Nextdoor has used addressed advertising mail to attract new users in several of the countries it operates in, using a form letter referencing the local neighborhood and credited to a local resident. According to Nextdoor, these letters only use the names of residents who have explicitly agreed to send invitations to their neighbors; however, some users claim to have been named in these letters without their permission, or that they thought they were merely clicking a link for more information about the invitations before agreeing to send them. On occasion, authorities not familiar with the service have issued alerts suggesting the mailings were potentially fraudulent, which Nextdoor has denied.

== Financials ==
As of December 2017, Nextdoor had raised $285 million in financing. About $75 million in new funding announced that month put its valuation at $1.5 billion. In a 2017 interview with Fortune, CEO Nirav Tolia had projected "tens of millions" in revenue for 2017, but in 2018 declined to disclose the total revenue for the year as well as whether it is profitable. In May 2019, Nextdoor raised $123 million at a $2.1 billion valuation.

In July 2021, the company announced it would go public in a reverse merger deal with a special-purpose acquisition company funded by Khosla Ventures that is valued at $4.3 billion.

In November 2023, Nextdoor reported a net loss of $38 million, compared to $35 million in the year-ago period, while also announcing a 25% reduction in its employee base.

In May 2026, Nextdoor reported 22.3 million weekly active users, with $62 million in quarterly revenue.

== See also ==
- Neighbors (app)
- List of social networking services
