= CCIE certification =

Certification from Cisco

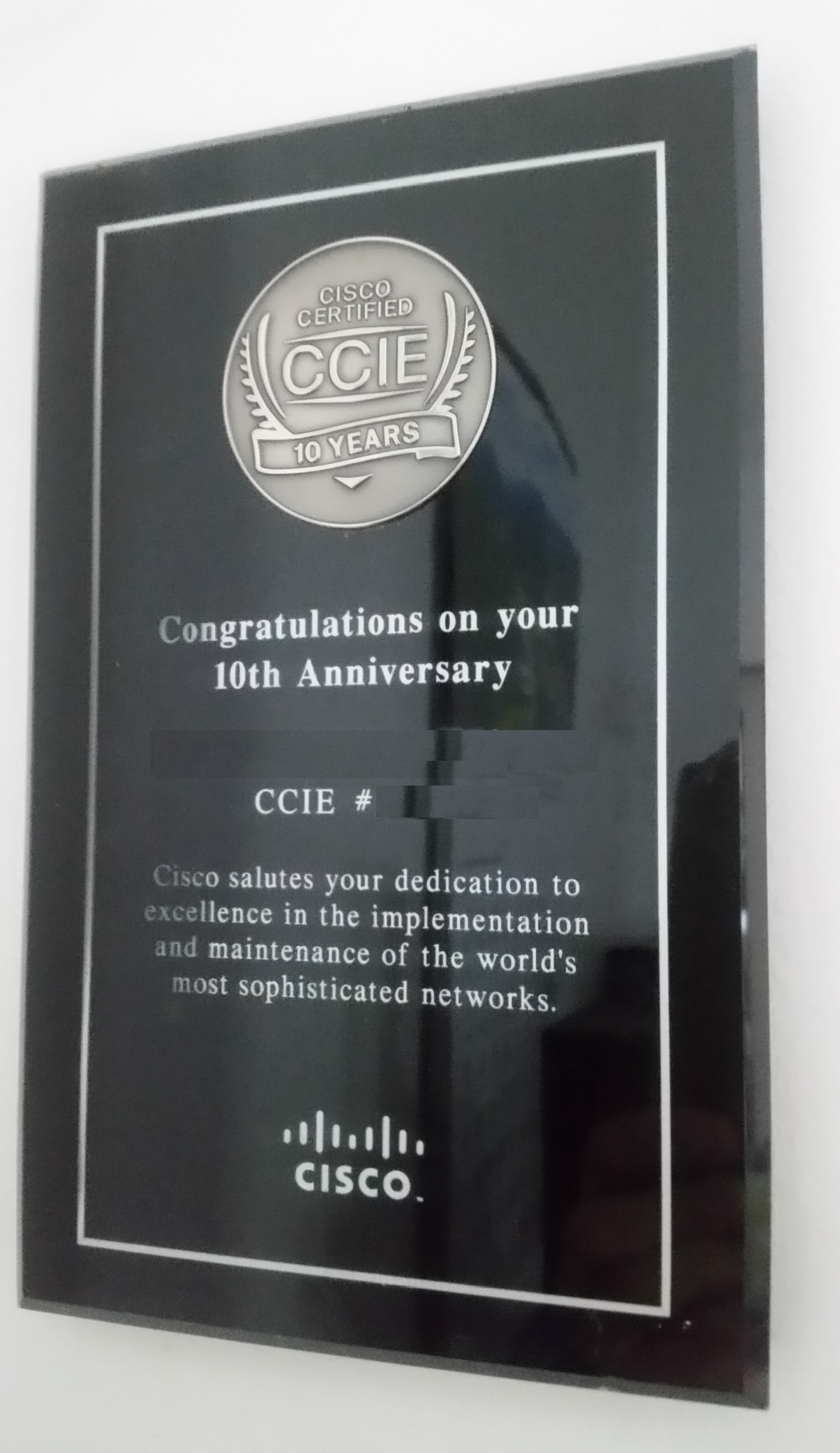
An example CCIE ceramic plaque

The Cisco Certified Internetwork Expert, or CCIE, is a technical certification offered by Cisco Systems. The Cisco Certified Internetwork Expert (CCIE) and Cisco Certified Design Expert (CCDE) certifications were established to certify top internetworking experts worldwide and to assess expert-level infrastructure network design skills worldwide. Holders of these certifications are generally acknowledged as having an advanced level of knowledge. The CCIE and CCDE communities have established a reputation for leading the networking industry in deep technical networking knowledge and are deployed in the most technically challenging network assignments.

The program is currently divided into six different areas of expertise or "tracks". One may choose to pursue multiple CCIE tracks in several different categories of Cisco technology: Routing & Switching, Service Provider, Security, Collaboration, Data Center, and Wireless.

== CCIE Requirements ==
CCIE candidates must first pass a written exam and then the corresponding hands-on lab exam. Though there are no formal requirements to take a CCIE certification exam, an in-depth understanding of the topics covered by the exams and three to five years of job experience are expected before attempting certification.

There are two test sets for the requirement for certification:

- Written Exam: Duration 120 minutes, 90–110 questions with multiple choice and simulation.
- Lab Exam: 8 hours Lab exam (One day), Previously, CCIE Lab Exams were two full-day exams.

Details: The CCIE Routing and Switching Lab exam consist of a 2-hour Troubleshooting section, a 30-minute Diagnostic section, and a 5-hour and 30-minute Configuration section. The format differs per track.

The eight-hour lab exam tests your ability to configure actual equipment and troubleshoot the network in a timed test situation. You must make an initial attempt at the CCIE lab exam within 18 months of passing the CCIE written exam. Candidates who do not pass must reattempt the lab exam within 12 months of their last scored attempt in order for their written exam to remain valid. If you do not pass the lab exam within three years of passing the written exam, you must retake the written exam before being allowed to attempt the lab exam again.

=== Overview of the CCIE Lab exam ===
The CCIE lab exam was first introduced in 1993 with a two-day test. As there was an overwhelming demand for CCIE certification, the waiting time for taking the lab exam was at least six months. In October 2001, Cisco updated the two-day lab exam to one day by removing some of the testing measures like diagramming, IP addressing, and troubleshooting.

When the CCIE lab test was two days:

- The first day comprised: building the network by patching, IP addressing, and configuration to terminal servers: it's the verification method of your performance about the whole layer 2 and 3 configurations. Before the end of the day about 5:15 pm, the proctor would mark your capability, and decide whether you are able to attend the second-day lab exam by passing an 80% pass mark on the first day.
- The second day: You would receive another paper that covered more configuration tasks during the morning session.

To configure the devices correctly, you should be aware of the core technologies. There are various hazards that you should understand as well as demonstrate basic networking knowledge and practical experience. The Proctor would observe your process and let you know whether you can attend the afternoon exam session for the troubleshooting field before the end of the day.

The current CCIE exam consists of eight hours within a day.

- There are three sections for the lab test.
- The troubleshooting module, the diagnostic module, and the configuration module.
- The process of lab examination ensures evaluations of the capabilities to the understanding of the essence of networking knowledge of the candidates.

You would receive the result of the lab exam within 48 hours. The failing score reports incorporate the details of your mark on the primary topic ranges. If you pass your lab exam, you will receive the passing result without the details of the statement.

Many lab centers across the US (e.g. California) have been closed down, leaving only Richardson, Texas open. As of 2020, these are the only available cities, worldwide, in which you can take the lab exam: Bangalore, Beijing, Brussels, Dubai, Feltham, Hong Kong, Johannesburg, Krakow, Mexico City, Moscow, Richardson, Riyadh, Sao Paulo, Shanghai, Singapore, Sydney, Tokyo, and Toronto.

== Tracks of Expert Certification ==
There are seven tracks of Expert Level certifications. It was designed for the requirement of the industry. It was updated over time, and the latest tracks should be verified on the official CCIE website.

- CCDE : Expert-level network design engineers capable of translating business needs, budget, and operational constraints into the design of a converged solution.
- CCIE Enterprise Infrastructure (formerly Routing and Switching, rebranded approx February 2020): The most popular CCIE track; for expert-level network engineers who can plan, operate, and troubleshoot complex, converged network infrastructure.
- CCIE Collaboration: Suitable expert level for Collaboration Architects, Unified Communications Architects, and Voice and Video Network Managers.
- CCIE Data Center: Experts in the planning, design, implementation and management of complex modern IT data center infrastructure.
- CCIE Security: Concerned with modern security risks, threats, and vulnerabilities; for security experts who have the knowledge and skills to architect, engineer, implement, troubleshoot, and support the full suite of Cisco security technologies and solutions using the latest industry best practices to secure systems and environments.
- CCIE Service Provider: Expert-level ISP (Internet Service Provider) network engineers who can build extensible Service Provider infrastructure to deliver rich managed services.
- CCIE Wireless: Experts who are able to demonstrate broad theoretical knowledge of wireless networking and a solid understanding of wireless local area networking (WLAN) technologies from Cisco.

== CCIE Emeritus ==
Active CCIE holders are able to apply for CCIE Emeritus status when they reach their tenth anniversary of CCIE certification. Lifetime Emeritus tenure is applicable to candidates who maintains their CCIE Active or Emeritus status for 20 consecutive years. It is necessary to submit the application of CCIE Emeritus within 60 days of the due date of the license expiry date.

- CCIE Emeritus status generally applies to those who have moved out of "day to day" network and technical work but would like to stay involved in the CCIE program serving as ambassadors to current and future CCIE programs.
- A CCIE Emeritus status holder is a non-active CCIE holder but candidates are recognized for technical proficiency and long term status within the CCIE program.
- CCIE Emeritus holders have the opportunity to re-enter active CCIE status by taking any current CCIE-level written exam.

== Continuing Education Program ==
The Continuing Education Program is an alternative way of re-certification for the CCIE license instead of passing the written exam. This program is managed according to three core principles: Flexibility, Diversity and Integrity.

- Flexibility: Allowing individuals a wide range of options for the re-certification.
- Diversity: Several options of training: online courses, instructor-led training and authoring of content.
- Integrity: Achieved by having Cisco authorized content providers with re-certification requirements validate the credits submitted by an individual.

== Relevance to real-world situations ==
Regarding a new approach to networking with software-defined networking, there are some critics about CCIE certifications that challenge corner-case scenarios of written and lab exams. However, the principle of networking is still the same regardless of whether a router or a switch is a physical device or just a piece of software, the fundamental networking operations remain the same in the real-world internetworking. CCIE holders are still relevant to the software-defined networking era.

== See also ==
- CCNA
- CCNP
- Cisco certifications
