= Entrepreneurs Roundtable Accelerator =

American technology startup accelerator

Entrepreneurs Roundtable Accelerator, LLC
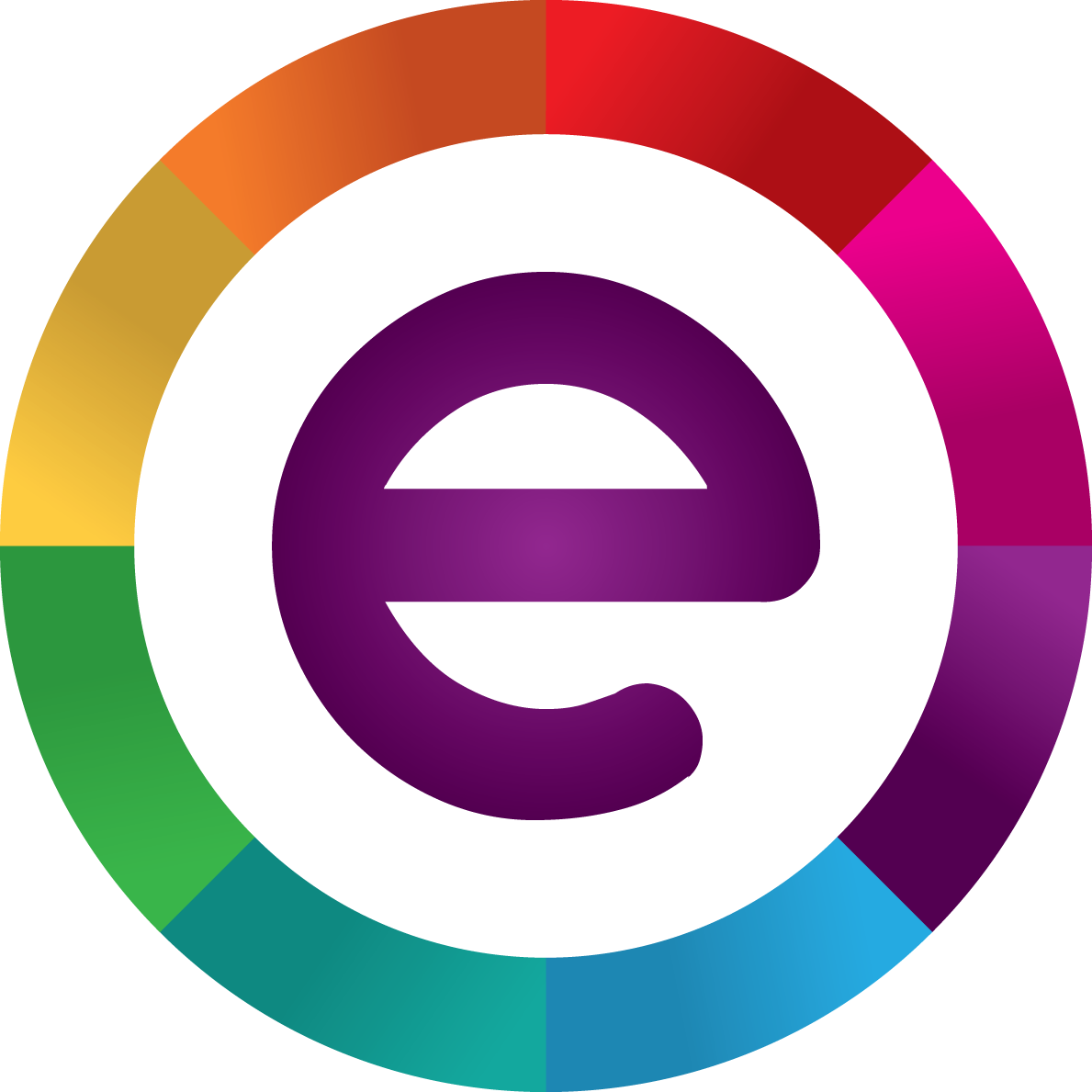
- Type: Limited liability company
- Industry: Startup accelerator Venture Capital
- Founder: Murat Aktihanoglu, Jonathan Axelrod, Charlie Kemper
- Headquarters: New York, New York, United States
- Number of locations: 1 office
- Products: Startup accelerator, Venture capital, Investment
- Website: www.eranyc.com

Entrepreneurs Roundtable Accelerator (aka ER Accelerator, or ERA) is an American seed accelerator launched in January 2011.

ERA runs two four-month startup accelerator programs per year, the first starting in January ("winter program") and the second starting in June ("summer program").

By analogy to education terminology, candidates for each semiannual accelerator program are called "applicants". The group of startup companies admitted into each semiannual cohort are collectively referred to as a "class". Startups that successfully graduate the accelerator program are called "alumni".

ERA alumni startup companies include Parking Panda (online parking app),Cups (mobile coffee app), Select (members-only loyalty charge card), Squarefoot (commercial real estate search and concierge app), WebThriftStore, PublicStuff (app for citizens to submit requests to subscribing municipal governments), numberFire (transparent statistical analysis of sporting data), DogSpot (formerly Dog Parker) (pay-by-the-minute doghouse service), and Flourish Savings (a white-label, turnkey banking app that uses automated saving rules, gamification, sweepstake prizes, and personal trivia to cultivate good financial habits).

ERA has launched over 375 startups which have raised more than US $2 billion and have a collective market valuation of over $10 billion (as of June 2025).

New York City has risen to second place (still behind Silicon Valley) in the startup venture investment market, passing significant global hubs such as London, Beijing, Tel Aviv, Los Angeles, and Boston, according to 2019 global ranking by Startup Genome. Some well-known startups have now sprung out of NYC, such as Foursquare, Kickstarter, Gilt, Etsy, Tumblr, DoubleClick and MongoDB. These developments gave Manhattan the nickname "Silicon Alley". ERA operates within this New York startup ecosystem.

New York's largest organization focused on the New York technology, startup, and entrepreneurial ecosystem, AlleyWatch, described ERA as "the longest-running NYC accelerator program" and a prominent accelerator in the country. Forbes says that many consider ERA to be "the top tech accelerator in New York." Independent academic research organization SARP (Seed Accelerators Ranking Project) ranked ERA in the top 20 seed accelerators of the U.S. in each of the 4 years 2012 -2015, but has never included ERA in their metal tiers (e.g., platinum, gold, silver). Growth Mentor describes ERA as "New York City’s largest accelerator program." Ideamotive included ERA in its list of New York startup accelerators. Of the over 100 accelerators and incubators operating in NYC, Crain's New York Business magazine described ERA as the "best-known" NYC tech accelerator. Crain's also ranked ERA #1 most active VC firm in the New York metropolitan area in 2019 (with 27 investments), and fifth in terms of funding round dollars (with $47.2 million).

== History ==
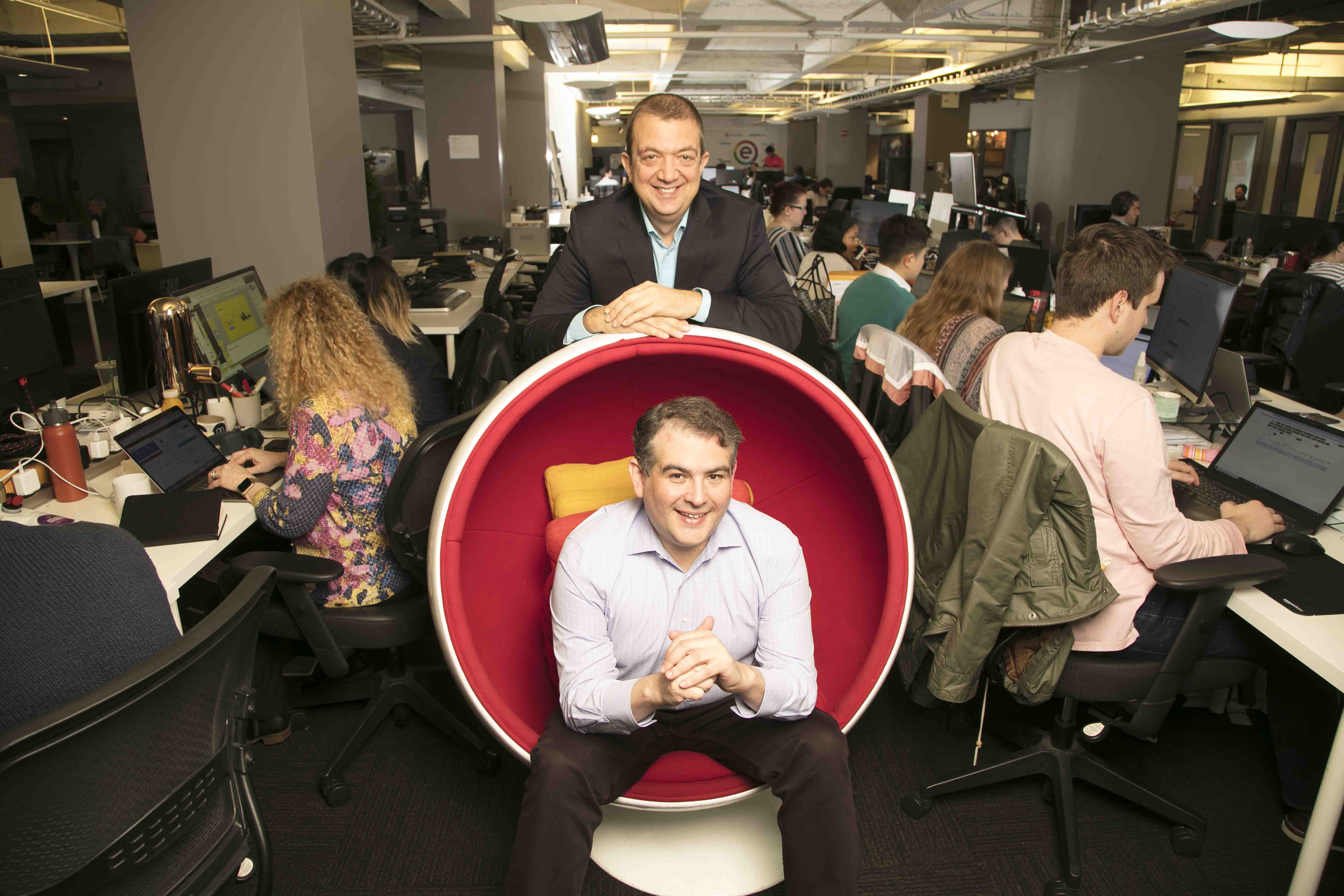
ERA cofounders Aktihanoglu (standing) and Axelrod (seated) in front of startup companies at ERA's New York City headquarters

Entrepreneurs Roundtable Accelerator (ERA) was founded in New York City in 2010 by Silicon Valley IT veteran Murat Aktihanoglu, serial entrepreneur Jonathan Axelrod (creator of MusicGremlin online music platform), and Charlie Kemper, venture capitalist. The first cohort was enrolled in ERA's inaugural summer 2011 accelerator program.

== Qualification for program ==
Entrepreneurs Roundtable Accelerator receives 1,000 to 2,000 web applications for each of its semiannual accelerator programs.

ERA admits 10 to 15 startup applicants (approximately 1%) into each of its semiannual accelerator programs.

Unlike accelerators that specialize in startups who cater to a single industry (e.g., theater, or finance, or fashion), ERA is an industry generalist.

ERA seeks startup companies that would thrive in markets where New York City has a commanding presence, such as Internet technology, mobile technology, FinTech, SaaS, E-commerce, media, marketing, advertising, education, fashion tech, real estate, entertainment, HealthTech, and logistics. Notwithstanding, the startups do not have to be from New York, or even headquartered there. For example, Squarefoot was initially based in Houston, Texas, but upon graduation from the ERA accelerator tried its hand at the much larger New York commercial real estate market.

ERA accepts startup companies who will either serve, or disrupt, these target markets. In fact, some alumni startup companies are "disrupting the disrupters", such as CUPS unifying the independent coffee shop experience to compete against the Starbucks chain, and Dashride automating ride-hailing for legacy taxi services so they can take on Uber.

ERA looks for either pure information technology companies, or companies whose product has a significant information technology thrust. For the vast majority of ERA startups, that IT dimension is software or software-related, not hardware.

ERA is agnostic with respect to whether applicant startup companies serve the B2B market, the B2C market, or both.

As an investor seeking a return, ERA does not accept not-for-profit applicant companies.

ERA invests in consumer-driven products, instead of product that make life better without consumer demand. Their view is that painkillers sell better than vitamins, and so are easier to monetize.

ERA prefers startups with two- to four-person founding teams in which at least one founder has strong technical skills, and where all founders work full-time on the venture.

Most ERA startups are early stage, with an assembled team and having developed an initial product. Many have some early customers and revenue. ERA considers early users and revenue a good sign the product has traction.

ERA expects a startup's pitch deck to illuminate key dimensions such as the problem, solution, business model, market, underlying technology, marketing strategy, sales strategy, competition, risks, scalability, startup team, track record, current status, milestones, and references.

Startup teams must be able to articulate their business model in terms of KPIs such as customer LTV, CAC, TAM, SAM, and SOM.

Applicant startup companies must be willing and able to temporarily relocate to ERA's New York facility for the entire four-month program.

== Description ==
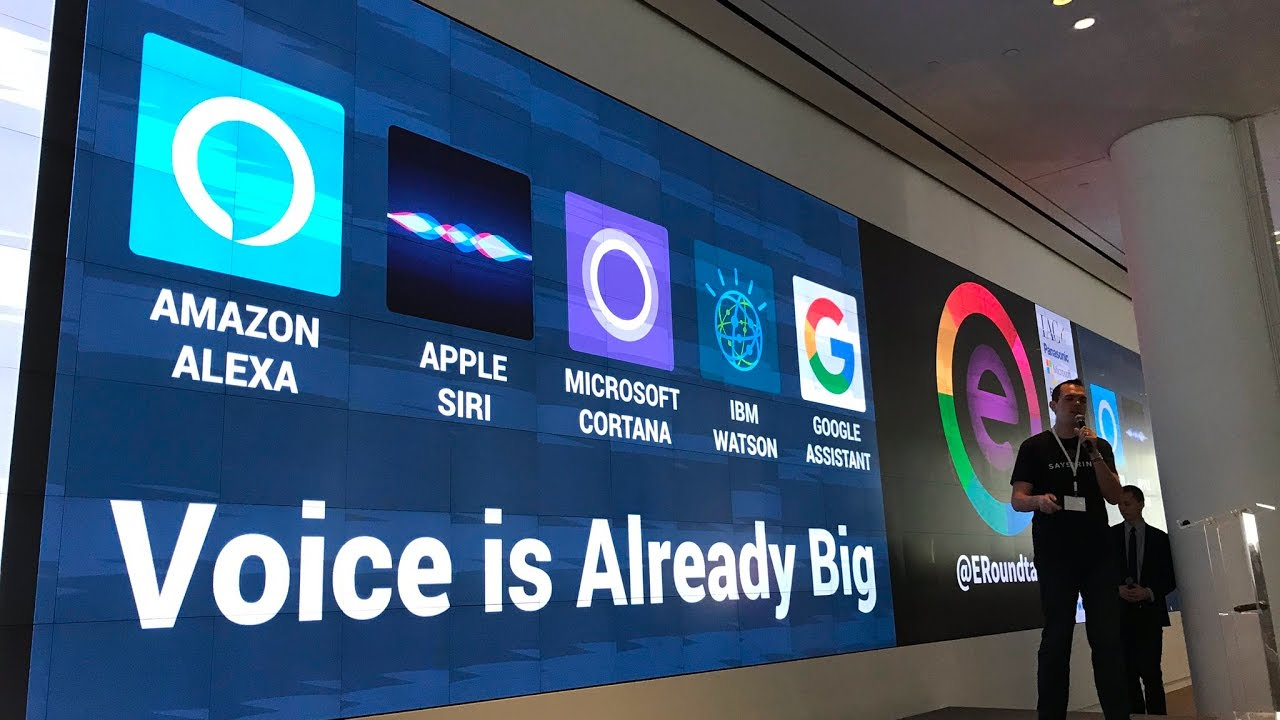
A startup company pitches at Demo Day of ERA winter 2017 program

For each startup company accepted into the ERA accelerator program, ERA claims to deliver coaching and mentorship from over 500 resident experts, members of the New York IT community, and entrepreneurs. Sometimes these mentors also become investors.

ERA tailors the curriculum to match the individual startup's requirements. For example, if a startup's founders need to implement mobile payments or protect IP, ERA delivers that specific training.

The ERA accelerator program culminates in Demo Day, where each startup company pitches their business to an audience of approximately 700 potential investors. Each presenter is introduced by unique walk-on music. Reporters covering Demo Day have described it as "part Shark Tank, part commencement ceremony." During the 2020 COVID-19 pandemic, ERA instead conducted Demo Days online via live streamed videoconferences.

ERA also connects startups with a network of angel investors, VC investors, and hybrid super angel investors.

In addition, ERA provides each startup company accepted into the accelerator program:

- free office space for duration of program
- over $100,000 free webhosting credits with larger cloud IT providers such as Amazon Web Services (AWS), Microsoft Azure, and Google Cloud Platform
- tens of thousands of dollars in free webhosting credits with smaller New York-based cloud providers such as IBM Cloud (formerly Dallas-based SoftLayer Technologies), and DigitalOcean
- $15,000 in credits from internet e-payment processor Stripe
- $50,000 in credits from internet e-payment processor PayPal Startup Blueprint Program
- free access to SendGrid Pro plan for 30K emails/month from Denver-based direct marketing and transactional email facilitator Twilio SendGrid
- legal service benefits from the Venture Technology team of multinational law firm Dentons
- finance services
- accounting services, including discounted support from external accounting firms such as WithumSmith+Brown
- 1 year free VoIP phone, messaging, and secure web video conferencing service from Phone.com (no relation to Openwave unit by the same name)
- free bank account and other services from technology startup specialist bank Silicon Valley Bank
- discounted services from NYC-based stock image firm Shutterstock, US carsharing company Zipcar, inbound marketing software maker HubSpot, automated relationship intelligence platform SalesforceIQ (formerly RelateIQ), SaaS big data BI platform RJMetrics, internet discussion forum InVision, incident record management and collaboration system FreshDesk, and SaaS customer support system Zendesk

ERA invests $150,000 on a post-money SAFE in return for 6% of each company accepted into a given cohort.

ERA does not take a management or board position in the startup company.

== Staffing ==
Below are illustrative examples of the type of people and expertise that ERA assigns to each startup company in the accelerator program.

ERA surrounds the startup company with:

- on-site ERA staff (e.g., Justin Smithline - founder of SoundCloud's Instinctiv unit for music discovery, management and synchronization)
- resident entrepreneurs (e.g., Nik Bonaddio - founder of numberFire for statistical analysis of sporting data)

ERA also connects the startup company with mentors. The mentors specialize in various fields such as IT technology, product design, UI, and UX. For example:

- Andrew Stroup, the founder of ERA alumni LVRG (pronounced "leverage"), an AI-driven vendor relationship management platform
- Fred Wilson, the cofounder of Union Square Ventures, a New York City venture capital firm
- David Pakman, internet entrepreneur and partner in Venrock, a VC firm that grows the wealth of the NY-based Rockefeller family

Finally, ERA partners the startup with investing experts such as:

- angel investor Alan Chung (investor and founder of Perka mobile loyalty platform)

== Outcomes ==
Startup advocate Don Dodge identified five outcomes that a startup venture seeks from any accelerator or incubator: 1) speeding business maturation 2) developing the product 3) honing a pitch 4) raising capital 5) gaining exposure to investors and media.

=== Business and product ===
Entrepreneurs Roundtable Accelerator (ERA) aims to strengthen a startup company's business model. Several ERA alumni companies credit their time in the accelerator program with rapidly building their business model. For example, Mariya Nurislamova, Founder of Scentbird, quantifies her learning pace inside the ERA accelerator program at six times faster (up to 2 years of self-discovery compressed into the then 3-month program). Nurislamova was thus able to use the first half of the program to sequentially test four unsuccessful business strategies, before following a mentor's suggestion to develop her immediately successful subscription-based business model. Likewise, it was at the suggestion of ERA mentors that alumni startup Chicory started charging food brands a virtual slotting fee to put their product directly into the buyer's online shopping cart.

=== Pitch ===
Jason E. Klein, CEO of VC firm On Grid Ventures and Chairman of New York's largest angel investor group, New York Angels, described ERA Demo Day pitches as "head and shoulders above any of the others I’d seen in NYC."

Alumni founders attribute the strength of their messaging to feedback they received from both ERA accelerator mentors and classmates.

=== Raising capital ===
ERA alumni companies have received funding from dozens of investors, including 500 Startups, Atlas Venture, Bessemer Venture Partners, Blumberg Capital, Comcast Ventures, Cowboy Ventures, Elevation Partners, ff Venture Capital, FirstMark Capital, First Round Capital, Founder Collective, Great Oaks Venture Capital, High Peaks Venture Partners, iNovia Capital, Insight Partners, The Kraft Group, Lerer Ventures, Lightbank, MATH Venture Partners, Matrix Partners, Milestone Venture Partners, NextView Ventures, Payment Ventures, Pilot Group, Plug & Play Ventures, RRE Ventures, Tribeca Venture Partners, True Ventures, as well as various seed funds and angel investors.

For example, The Wall Street Journal reported that Young Alfred (machine learning AI-powered licensed digital broker that integrates with insurance carriers such as Progressive and Lemonade) landed $10 million funding a few months after graduating from the ERA winter 2018 accelerator program. CNBC reported that Parking Panda has raised over $5 million, with the first investor coming through ERA.

Sometimes ERA itself will elect to make a follow-on investment in an alumni startup's subsequent funding rounds.

=== Exposure ===
If an ERA startup company shows promise, the startup typically leverages its newly established New York City presence and ERA media networks to garner media exposure. For example, ERA alumni company WebThriftStore has been covered by NYC-based Condé Nast's magazine Glamour, NYC-based Hearst's magazine O, The Oprah Magazine, NYC-based magazine Business Insider, and NYC-based e-magazine NY Convergence. The New York Times devoted an article to ERA startup alumni Daivergent (connects IT companies such as SAP with a pool of candidate workers on the autism spectrum). In 2013, Forbes highlighted ERA alumni PublicStuff's founder Lily Liu as having built an "outstanding company." Forbes also ranked ERA alumni company PublicStuff #85 in its America's Most Promising Companies 2014, but dropped it off the list two years later. In 2019, NYC-based Fox Business News television broadcast their interview of the cofounders of ERA alumni company With Clarity (delivers 3D printed wedding rings to try on at home). The New York Times published an article on ERA startup alumni CUPS (mobile coffee app). The NYC-based Wall Street Journal ran a piece on ERA alumni Appy Couple (mobile wedding app).

This media reach can extend thousands of kilometers away from New York. For example, when ERA alumni PublicStuff expanded its customer footprint into the San Francisco Bay Area in 2013, the flagship publication of NYC-based Hearst Communications, the San Francisco Examiner, reported that the Daly City planner had declared their iHelp app "a huge success." Similarly, the London-based Financial Times ranked two ERA alumni startups (With Clarity, Fund That Flip) in the top 5% of independent Western Hemisphere companies based on top-line organic CAGR over the 3-year period 2015 - 2018.

ERA alumni companies are sometimes featured in video pieces in major publications. For example, cofounder Jessie Zeng was a "Featured Honoree" in a Forbes magazine video about ERA startup Choosy (an online, on-demand, small run fashion app based on social media likes and comments). NYC-based NBC published on the web their television interview of the founders of ERA alumni startup Triplemint (technology-enabled real estate brokerage).

Six ERA alumni companies made it onto Inc. Magazine's 2019 Inc. 5000 list, which ranks the 5,000 independent, for-profit, U.S. private companies with the fastest revenue growth over the preceding 3 years (2015 - 2018). For example, alumni startup Fund That Flip (graduate of ERA summer 2015 accelerator program) placed #42 with 3-year revenue growth of 6,018%.

At least five ERA alumni startup founders have been recognized on Forbes’ list of 30 under 30. For example, Forbes list 30 Under 30 - Retail & Ecommerce 2020 featured Yuni Sameshima and Joey Petracca, the two cofounders of ERA's startup Chicory (app that turns recipes into shoppable ingredient lists).

=== Other ===
In 2025, ERA portfolio company Rockerbox was acquired by DoubleVerify (DV) for $85M; DV is publicly traded on the NYSE.

In 2021, ERA portfolio company, Katapult, was acquired by a Special Purpose Acquisition Corporation (SPAC) that valued the company at $1 billion. The company is now publicly traded on the NASDAQ stock exchange under ticker, KPLT.

In 2021, ERA portfolio company, TripleLift, sold a majority stake in its business to Vista Equity Partners, valuing the former at $1.4 billion.

Prior to 2021, ERA had not launched any unicorns.

Not all ERA alumni startup ventures survive and flourish. For example, the WebThriftStore website indicates it is now closed.

Similarly, alumni startup Consignd appears to have ceased operations, and its cofounders joined forces with founders of another startup (VocalizeLocal) they had met in the same ERA winter 2013 cohort to form a new $400 million e-commerce unicorn called Casper.

== Regulatory ==
Entrepreneurs Roundtable Accelerator (ERA) is licensed and registered under the Central Registration Depository (CRD) system that is maintained by the U.S. private self-regulatory organization FINRA.

ERA is also registered with the U.S. federal SEC and state securities authorities, and annually updates the Form ADV filing after its December fiscal yearend pursuant to the SEC-enforced U.S. federal Investment Advisers Act of 1940.

== See also ==
- 500 Startups
- AngelPad
- MassChallenge
- Techstars
- Y Combinator
