= Rescue organization =

Rescue organization can refer to:

- Animal rescue group
- Wildlife rehabilitation
- Search and rescue organization, for people
