= SquareFoot =

- Type: Private
- Founded: April 2011
- Founders: Jonathan Wasserstrum; Justin Lee; Aron Susman
- Headquarters: New York City, United States
- Area served: Houston; Austin; Dallas; New York City; Los Angeles; Atlanta; Nashville
- Key people: Michael Colacino (president)
- Number of employees: 45
- Website: www.squarefootfinance.com

SquareFoot Inc. is a PropTech company that provides brokerage services, an online database of commercial real estate listings, and a technology-enabled office search process. The headquarters are located in New York City. Jonathan Wasserstrum is the incumbent chief executive officer of the company.

It was founded in 2011 by Jonathan Wasserstrum, Justin Lee, and Aron Susman.

== History ==
The company was incorporated by Jonathan Wasserstrum, Justin Lee, and Aron Susman in 2011 and launched the first prototype in the spring of 2012 at VentureBeat's DEMO Conference in San Francisco. The first market for the company was in Houston, Texas, where they initially raised $350,000.

In 2013, SquareFoot completed its first leasing project involving an e-commerce tailoring company, Knot Standard. In the same year, it was also included in the 4th class of the Entrepreneurs Roundtable Accelerator in New York. By April 2013, it had expanded to Austin, Dallas, and New York City. Later, TechCrunch named SquareFoot as one of the "Top 5 Startups to Watch". They closed another round of $500,000 from investors in the summer of 2013 to continue growth with Boston as one of the next markets in 2014.

In April 2015, SquareFoot announced its first institutional financing round led by Primary Venture Partners, with participation from RRE Ventures and Triangle Peak Partners.

In 2018, it raised $7 million in funding led by Rosecliff Ventures and other investors including RRE Ventures, Triangle Peak Partners, and Armory Square Ventures.

In 2019, SquareFoot raised another $16 million from investors including Triangle Peak Partners, RRE, and Rosecliff. In November 2019, Michael Colacino, former president of Savills, joined SquareFoot as its new president.

In March 2021, SquareFoot started expanding outside of its New York City headquarters, opening offices in Houston and Los Angeles.

In July 2021, after the acquisition of TranscendCRE, SquareFoot expanded to Atlanta and Nashville.

== Acquisitions ==
In February 2019, the company acquired PivotDesk, also known as the Airbnb of office space, for an undisclosed amount.

In June 2021, SquareFoot acquired Upsuite, a private co-working and workplace company.

In July 2021, the company acquired TranscendCRE, a company founded by Patrick Braswell.
