= Internet Miniature Pinscher Service =

Non-profit animal-rescue organization

- Formation: July 1, 1998; 28 years ago
- Founder: Petie Hoving Durand
- Purpose: Pet rescue
- Region served: United States of America, Canada
- Official language: English
- Website: Official website

Internet Miniature Pinscher Service (IMPS) is a non-profit animal rescue organization based in United States of America. The organization was established in 1998 by Petie Hoving Durand and is dedicated to adoption and rescue of Miniature Pinscher, a small breed of dogs originating from Germany. Internet Miniature Pinscher Service (IMPS) is the largest single breed rescue service in America. Currently, organization operates in United States of America and Canada. The organization has to date rescued over 20,000 dogs and currently has 500 volunteers throughout the United States and Canada.

== Activities ==
Internet Miniature Pinscher Service (IMPS) was formed in 1998 by Petie Hoving Durand as a rescue group that focuses on the Miniature Pinscher breed. The organization assists the animals by providing foster care, transport, adoptive homes, veterinary care and other services and information for the well-being of Miniature Pinschers. Internet Miniature Pinscher Service (IMPS) mission is to improve the lives of homeless and abandoned animals through rescue. The organization rehabilitates and secures new homes for Miniature Pinschers who have been abandoned by their owners. It also runs microchipping and neutering programs in the United States and Canada, in order to reduce the number of unwanted litters of puppies and stray dogs euthanized by other organizations. All Miniature Pinschers placed through IMPS are spayed or neutered prior to placement and then thoroughly evaluated by a breed representative for temperament and training needs.

== See also ==
- Animal welfare in the United States
