= Web Thrift Store =

- Website type: Online thrift store
- Founded: 2011
- Headquarters: New York City, United States
- Founders: Douglas Krugman; Lynn Zises
- Website: webthriftstore.com
- Current status: Closed

Web Thrift Store was an American charitable fundraising platform based in New York City that enabled nonprofit organizations to raise money by selling donated goods online. Founded in 2011 by Doug Krugman and Lynn Zises, the company allowed donors to contribute items without charities maintaining their own inventory. During its operation, the platform partnered with dozens of nonprofit organizations and launched several donation campaigns and mobile initiatives before ceasing operations.

== History ==
Web Thrift Store was founded in 2011 by Doug Krugman and Lynn Zises in New York City. The stated goal of the company is to allow non-profit organizations to run online thrift stores without having to maintain inventory. The two founded the organization to get people to donate things that they do not use in order to raise cash for non-profits. Items donated to the website earn money for charities. People who donate items through WebThriftStore receive tax deductions and can choose which charities they want to donate the money to.

=== Partnerships ===
When the website began it had a total of three partners. By early 2015, more than 60 nonprofit organizations participated on the platform, including ASPCA, New York Cares, Ronald McDonald House Charities, People for the Ethical Treatment of Animals (PETA), National Geographic Society, American Red Cross, Maccabi USA, and Orphans Africa.

Other organizations included:

- Connections to Success
- The North Shore Animal League
- MAG America
- Generation Rescue
- Children's Brain Tumor Foundation
- Biblical Life Ministries
- Colonel Potter Cairn Rescue Network
- Bark & Meow Foundation
- 7th District Foundation
- Wild Animal Sanctuary
- Alliance for Lupus Research
- Animal Legal Defense Fund

=== Campaigns ===
In 2013, WebThriftStore, in conjunction with select charity partners, announced a donation competition called #OneGoodThing to raise new item donations.[6] It also created a donation drive called #SpringCleanForACause for similar purposes to take place on March 20, 2015. Web Thrift Store released a mobile app called ThriftSNAP, which allows people to donate items quickly. The website runs an annual Valentine's Day event called "Donate Your Heartbreak", where people are encouraged to donate gifts from ex-lovers to charity. People who donate items such as these for this event are also invited to share stories related to the items through Web Thrift Store. WebThriftStore collaborated with animal-related charities including ASPCA, PETA, the Bark & Meow Foundation, Colonel Potter Cairn Rescue Network, Fidelco Guide Dog Foundation, Internet Miniature Pinscher Service, RedRover, and the Spay-Neuter Assistance Program in a "Coats for Canines" drive to encourage people to donate coats and sweaters to these charities for dogs in order to help them combat the cold. New York Cares held a donation drive from June 20 to June 22, 2014, in conjunction with WebThriftStore and the taxi service Uber and its "UberRUSH" service. The collaboration was for the purpose of encouraging people to donate their possessions by having Uber drivers pick the things up. In November 2014, Web Thrift Store joined the Blackbaud Partner Network.

== Recognition and media coverage ==
Web Thrift Store has been covered in multiple magazines, including Glamour and O, The Oprah Magazine. Web Thrift Store, along with nine other startups, were given space in Times Square offices for three months in 2011 by Entrepreneurs Roundtable, as well as $25,000 and access to more than 180 mentor figures in exchange for a percentage of the company's stake. Web Thrift Store was covered by Business Insider in its article about 10 New York City-based startups. It was also covered in a list of five New York City startups by NY Convergence. Columbia Business School Magazine suggested that Web Thrift Store could be good competition for The Salvation Army. The website "Looking Fly on a Dime" praised the organization for allowing non-profits to choose where the earnings from their donations go, which is not something that all thrift stores tell. The website "Connect With Your Teens Through Pop Culture and Technology" included it in a list of four social entrepreneurships "where you can do good." Web Thrift Store was selected to speak at the South by Southwest Interactive 2014 event for a discussion called "Doing Good and Making Money." The website miratel solutions inc. speculated that Web Thrift Store may indicate that online charity shops may become more prominent in the future. Web Thrift Store attended an event called COMMON Pitch NYC, an event where businesses present pitches for their product or service to a panel of celebrity judges and compete with each other.

For the whole of 2013, sales and donations grew more than 200 percent according to The Alumni Magazine of the Columbia Business School.
