= Animal rescue group =

Rescue organization is dedicated to pet adoption

An animal rescue group or animal rescue organization is a group dedicated to pet adoption. These groups take abandoned, abused, or stray pets and attempt to find suitable homes for them. Many rescue groups are created and run by volunteers, who take animals into their homes and care for them—including training, playing, handling medical issues, and solving behavior problems—until a suitable permanent home can be found.

Rescue groups also exist for many types of small companion mammals, including guinea pigs, rabbits, rats, mice, and hamsters. For animals with many breeds, rescue groups may specialize in specific breeds or groups of breeds. For example, there might be local Labrador Retriever rescue groups, hunting dog rescue groups, large-dog rescue groups, as well as general dog rescue groups.

Animal rescuers take the animals and care for the animals in need.

Animal rescue organizations have also been created to rescue and rehabilitate wild animals, such as lions, tigers, and cheetahs; a job which is normally shared or backed by zoos and other conservation charities. These animals are normally released back into the wild where possible, otherwise they will remain in captivity and, for endangered species, may be used in breeding programs.

Widely recognized as an umbrella organization for animal rescue groups, Petfinder.org is an online, searchable database of more than 13,000 shelters and adoption agencies across the United States, Canada and Mexico. The American Kennel Club maintains a list of contacts, primarily within breed clubs, with information on breed rescue groups for purebred dogs in the United States.

Animal shelters often work closely with rescue groups, because shelters that have difficulty placing otherwise healthy pet animals would usually rather have the animal placed in a home than euthanized; while shelters might run out of room, rescue groups can often find volunteers with space in their homes for temporary placement. Some organizations (such as Old Dog Haven) work with older animals whose age would likely cause them to be euthanized in county pounds. Each year, approximately three to four million cats and dogs are euthanized in shelters due to overcrowding and a shortage of foster homes.

In the United Kingdom, both shelter and rescue organizations are described using the blanket term rescue, whether they have their own premises, buy in accommodation from commercial kennels, or operate a network of foster homes, where volunteers keep the animals in their homes until adoption.

Kennels that have a council contract to take in stray dogs are usually referred to as dog pounds. Some dog pounds also carry out rescue and rehoming work and are effectively rescue groups that operate a pound service. Some rescue groups work with pounds to move dogs to rescues. By law, a dog handed in as a stray to a UK pound must be held for seven days before it can be rehomed or euthanized.

In the US, there are three classifications for pet rescue:

- A municipal shelter is a facility that houses stray and abandoned animals, as well as animals that people can no longer care for, on behalf of local governments.
- A no-kill shelter is a usually private organization whose policies include the specification that no healthy, pet-worthy animal be euthanized.
- Not-for-profit rescue organizations typically operate through a network of volunteer foster homes. These rescue organizations are also committed to a no-kill policy.

Many modern not-for-profit rescue organizations now not only focus on rehoming rescued animals, but rehabilitating and training them as well. Severely abused animals cannot move quickly from their previous environment into a new home. Specialized and trained rescue staff must identify signs of aggression and anxiety and work to remedy these behaviors. As with people, the recovery process is different for all animals. Some may recover immediately while others may always show signs of trauma.

== Rescue groups and shelters ==
There are two major differences between shelters and rescue groups. Shelters are usually run and funded by local governments. Rescue groups are funded mainly by donations and most of the staff are volunteers. While some shelters place animals in foster homes, many are housed on-site in kennels. Some rescue groups have facilities and others do not. Foster homes are heavily utilized in either case.

Within the dog rescue community, there are breed-specific and all-breed rescues. As its name implies, breed-specific rescues save purebred dogs of a certain breed; for example, Akitas, Boxers, Dalmatians, Labrador Retrievers, etc. Almost every breed is supported by a network of national and international rescue organizations with the goal to save abandoned dogs of this breed. All-breed rescues are not limited to purebred dogs. Instead they save dogs of any breed. Many work with specific shelters to support their efforts.

== Adopting through a rescue group ==
Most rescue groups use similar adoption procedures, including completing an application, checking a veterinary reference, conducting an interview (either in person or by phone), and a home visit. Rescue organizations are usually volunteer-run organizations and survive on donations and adoption fees. The adoption fees do not always cover the significant costs involved in rescue, which can include traveling to pick up an animal in need, providing veterinary care, vaccinations, food, spaying and neutering, training, and more.

Most animals in the care of rescue groups live with foster home volunteers as members of the family until an appropriate adopter is found. There are a number of different techniques that can be used to make the transition from life at a rescue's foster home to an adoptive home easier on the animal. Generally, rescue groups provide adopters with basic information to aid in a successful transition.

Often adoption counsellors are involved in the process to ensure that the pet is being sent to a suitable home. Questionnaires for adoption vary between organizations, but are essentially used to ensure that the animal being adopted suits the lifestyle of the prospect owner and will have all of their needs fulfilled.

The Canadian Federation of Humane Societies accounts for the largest number of dog and cat shelters in Canada. With 172 shelters throughout the country, it is estimated that 103,000 cats and 46,000 dogs were taken in during 2013. Of these, 60% of cats and 49% of dogs were strays, 28% of cats and 34% of dogs were surrendered by their owners, 2% of cats and 3% of dogs were cases of abuse, and the rest were either transferred from neighbouring facilities or born in the shelters themselves.

Of the thousands of animals in shelters in Canada in 2013, only 47% of dogs and 45% of cats were adopted. The remaining majority were left to be euthanized, sent back to their previous owners, or stayed in the shelters, possibly being transferred from one to another to increase adoptability.

The rise of social media has since aided in adoption of pets. Shelters and rescue groups can now post pictures and biographies of the animals on their social media pages. These outlets allow people to find suitable pets in need of homes. Online interviews are now also possible, as well as international adoption through many organizations. Developments such as social media pages help shelters find appropriate adopters by venturing outside of their immediate surroundings and creating online networks, allowing more people to be exposed to the information and possibility of animal adoption. Dogs and Cats of the Dominican Republic, for example, is an organization that creates profiles for stray animals in the Dominican Republic, and uses an almost entirely online platform to find homes for them, usually overseas, before sending them by plane, spayed and neutered, to be picked up by their new owner.

== Wildlife rescue groups ==
Wildlife rescue groups, unlike many other animal rescue organizations, focus on the rehabilitation of sick, injured and orphaned wild animals. There are also groups which rescue animals from illegal breeders, roadside circuses, and many other abusive situations. They do not seek to find adoptive homes for the animals, but rather to reintroduce the animals to lifestyles that suit their needs and that allow them to live freely, sometimes even releasing them into the wild.

== See also ==
- List of animal sanctuaries
- List of animal welfare groups
- Royal Society for the Prevention of Cruelty to Animals
- Society for the Prevention of Cruelty to Animals
