= Oltac Unsal =

Turkish Technology Investor

- Education: Stanford University
- Occupation: Venture Capitalist
- Employer: Smyrna Capital
- Known for: Gezi Park protests
- Website: https://unsal.com

Oltac Unsal is a Turkish technology investor and economic development executive who is notable for creating the fastest political crowdfunding campaign in history for the Turkish Gezi Protests. Unsal created a crowdsourced and crowdfunded advertisement in The New York Times with Murat Aktihanoglu and Duygu Atacan. It was the fastest political crowdfunding campaign in history. The ad featured demands for "an end to police brutality", "a free and unbiased media", and "an open dialogue, not the dictate of an autocrat". The editing of the final advertisement involved thousands of people, and the ad was published on 7 June 2013.

Despite its financing by 2,654 online funders, Turkish Prime Minister Erdoğan and his administration blamed a domestic and foreign "interest rate lobby" and The New York Times for the ad.

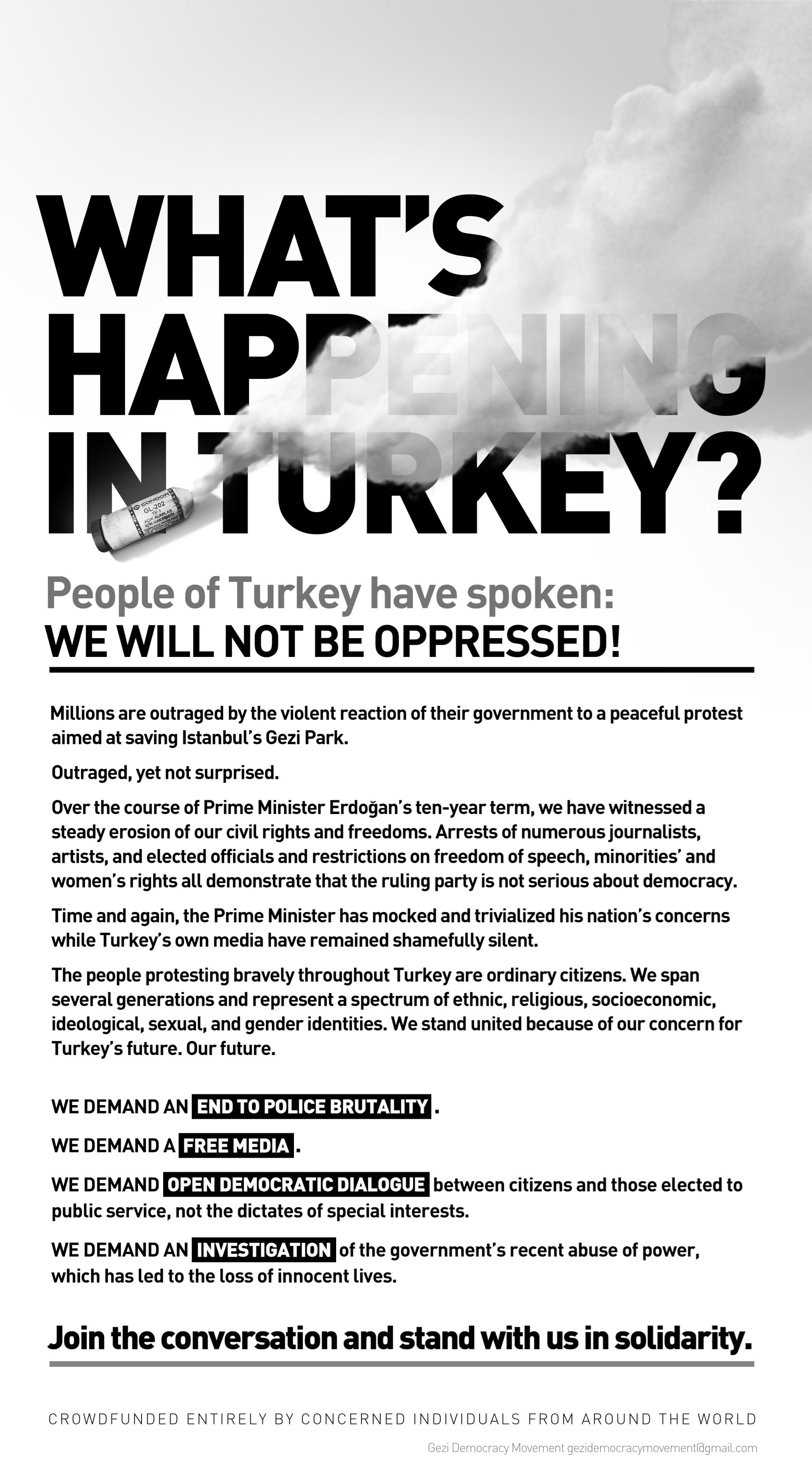
New York Times ad "What's Happening in Turkey?"

Unsal also co-founded the Good Party in Turkey on October 25, 2017, which went on to win 10% of national vote 8 months later.
