= Jason E. Klein =

American businessman

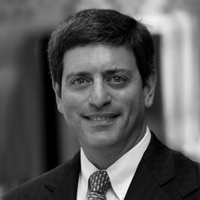
Jason E. Klein

Jason E. Klein is an American media executive. He is the founder and CEO of VC firm On Grid Ventures LLC, an advisory and investment firm in digital media, marketing and information focused on GeoDisruptive businesses. He is also chairman of Harvard Business School Angel Investors of New York and co-president of Harvard Business School Alumni Angels Association. He was the president and CEO of Newspaper National Network LP from 2003 to 2012.

Klein is the former president and CEO of Times Mirror Magazines (TMM), a leading magazine publisher with $300 million in revenue and 25 titles including Field & Stream, Outdoor Life, Golf Magazine, and Popular Science. He helped engineer Tribune Company’s $475 million sale of the former TMM to Time Inc. in 2000. This was part of the $8.3 billion transaction that is the largest acquisition in the history of the newspaper industry.

He was recognized by Media Life Magazine as one of the “100 people to know” in the media industry.

== Career ==
=== Newspaper National Network (2003–2012) ===
Klein previously served as the president and CEO of Newspaper National Network LP (NNN), the leading national network for local media. He led its expansion from a focus on daily print newspapers to a full line provider of scalable, integrated marketing solutions encompassing web, mobile, and tablet formats. While CEO NNN led in the use of media effectiveness metrics.

=== MDconsult.com and Healthy Living Media (2001–2003) ===
He is a founder of MDconsult.com, an aggregator of medical information for professionals, now owned by Elsevier. He also founded Healthy Living Media, a private-equity backed venture, with North Castle Partners.

=== Times Mirror Magazines (1993–2001) ===
Klein was the CEO of Times Mirror Magazines, a leading magazine publisher with $300 million in revenue and 25 titles including Golf Magazine, Popular Science, Transworld Skateboarding, Outdoor Life, Field & Stream, and Skiing; and leading vertical digital properties including popsci.com, and golfmagazine.com.

He ran Times Mirror Magazines when its parent company was sold to Tribune Company in 2000, and he oversaw the divestiture of Times Mirror Magazines to Time Inc. for $475 million, and ran the integration into Time Inc. and rebranding as Time4Media (currently Bonnier Group, as of 2007).

He joined the company as president and Group Publisher of Field & Stream and Outdoor Life magazines, and oversaw their turnaround from record losses to the company's most profitable magazines. He also completed the acquisition of 15 companies in two years and built a consumer health information sector for Times Mirror's medical and professional division.

=== Management Consulting (1982–1993) ===
Klein began his career at Bain & Company as an associate consultant focused on consumer goods, technology, and health care.

He worked at McKinsey & Company from 1986 to 1993, where he was the Director of Strategy and Personal Information. His clients included television networks, consumer packaged goods companies, magazine publishers, and department stores.

== Personal ==
Klein is the chairman of Harvard Business School Alumni Angels of Greater New York and a member of New York Angels. He also serves as a mentor for several NYC-area incubators, and is on the advisory board of 72Lux, the leading e-commerce solution for publishers. He is the former chairman of the editorial board of the Dartmouth College Alumni Magazine, a trustee for the New York City Police Foundation, and a former board member of the Magazine Publishers of America.

He holds an MBA from Harvard Business School ('86) and an AB from Dartmouth College ('82), where he graduated Phi Beta Kappa and magna cum laude in computer science. Klein has two adult children, Michael and Jill.
