= Dog Parker =

American membership-based doghouse service

Dog Parker is a membership-based pay-by-the-minute doghouse service launched in a private pilot program in Brooklyn, NY in October 2015. The company plans to install dog houses across New York City, as well as other locations across the US.

In November 2016, Dog Parker announced the release of their new model that would be installed in various Brooklyn neighborhoods. The new model contains an internet-connected webcam that users can view their dog with. Members use either the app or a membership card to lock and unlock the Dog Parker. Dog Parkers are also fitted with a UVC sanitation light, which handles surface level cleaning of the Dog Parker between daily maintenance visits. The membership works similar to services such as Car2Go.

Dog Parker was founded by Chelsea Brownridge and Todd Schechter in 2015 and completed the Entrepreneurs Roundtable Accelerator in NYC in 2016.
