= Cups (app) =

Cups (stylized as CUPS) was a mobile app launched in New York City in April 2014. It was a mobile payment and discovery platform for independent coffee shops nearby. The app was active in more than 400 cafes in New York, San Francisco, Philadelphia, Nashville, Minneapolis and Saint Paul, and other U.S. cities.

== History ==
Cups was founded in Israel in 2012 by Gilad Rotem and four other co-founders, who were all high school friends. The company ran a limited beta pilot in Tel Aviv and Jerusalem, featuring 80 locations, from September 2012 until September 2014. Customers received all-you-can-drink coffee at certain coffee shops in Tel Aviv for approximately $45 a month. In October 2013, the founders relocated to New York. Cups participated in the Entrepreneur's Roundtable Accelerator program and went live in New York in 2014, initially working with 50 small coffee shops in Manhattan and Brooklyn.

In early 2016, the company launched 30 locations in Philadelphia in February, followed by 40 more locations in San Francisco in March.

== Functionality ==
The Cups app gave the user a list of the nearest participating coffee shops to their current location. The app user can order a drink using the app and pay the cashier with their phone. The cashier would enter a code that entered the purchase into the app's system. The app also allowed for onboard tipping and food purchases. The company reimbursed the coffee shop and kept a portion of their sales.

In early 2016, the Cups Café Network was launched, using bulk purchasing power to land discounts with service providers which would normally be reserved for larger chains. In this way, the company aimed to help its café partners compete with the larger coffee chains.
