= Old Dog Haven =

US non-profit organization

OldDog Haven logo

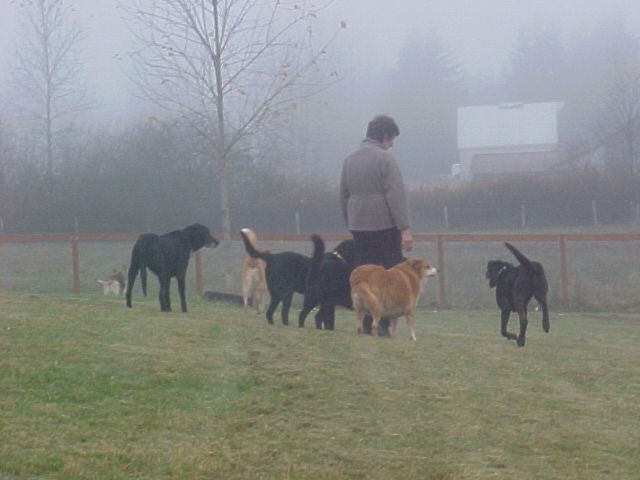
A walk in the field at Home Base

OldDog Haven is 501(c)(3) not-for-profit charitable organization whose goal it is to improve the quality of life of geriatric or "senior" dogs that need care and homes, mainly in the western part of Washington state.

== History ==
The group was formed in 1994 by shelter volunteers who saw senior dogs overlooked by adopters. OldDog Haven uses a network of people to provide loving and safe homes for abandoned senior dogs. A Home Base where the founders live and care for a number of dogs is located in Arlington, Washington. OldDog Haven does not have a shelter. All of the dogs in its care live happily in homes with foster families who love and cherish them as valued family members.

The organization has seen that many dogs of advanced years are rejected by owners, or are left behind when an elderly owner must move to an independent or assisted living facility or a nursing home: these animals are often left at animal shelters—where their chance of adoption is negligible—or pass to family or friends who are not prepared to deal with the needs of an older dog. As a result, many of these animals are in poor physical condition, making them even less adoptable.

== Activities ==
Wherever possible, OldDog Haven employs a network of foster homes and supporters to take in and care for the animals: every effort is made to adopt out dogs with a reasonable life-expectancy; the others are cared for as long as their quality of life remains good in what are called "Final Refuge" homes. OldDog Haven also attempts to assist owners or their families in finding new homes for senior dogs through its website and through referrals.

== Funding ==
OldDog Haven does not receive any state or federal funds: the organization relies on donations and fund-raising activities for its income. All donations to OldDog Haven are tax-deductible.

== See also ==
- Animal Aid Unlimited
