= Human uses of mammals =

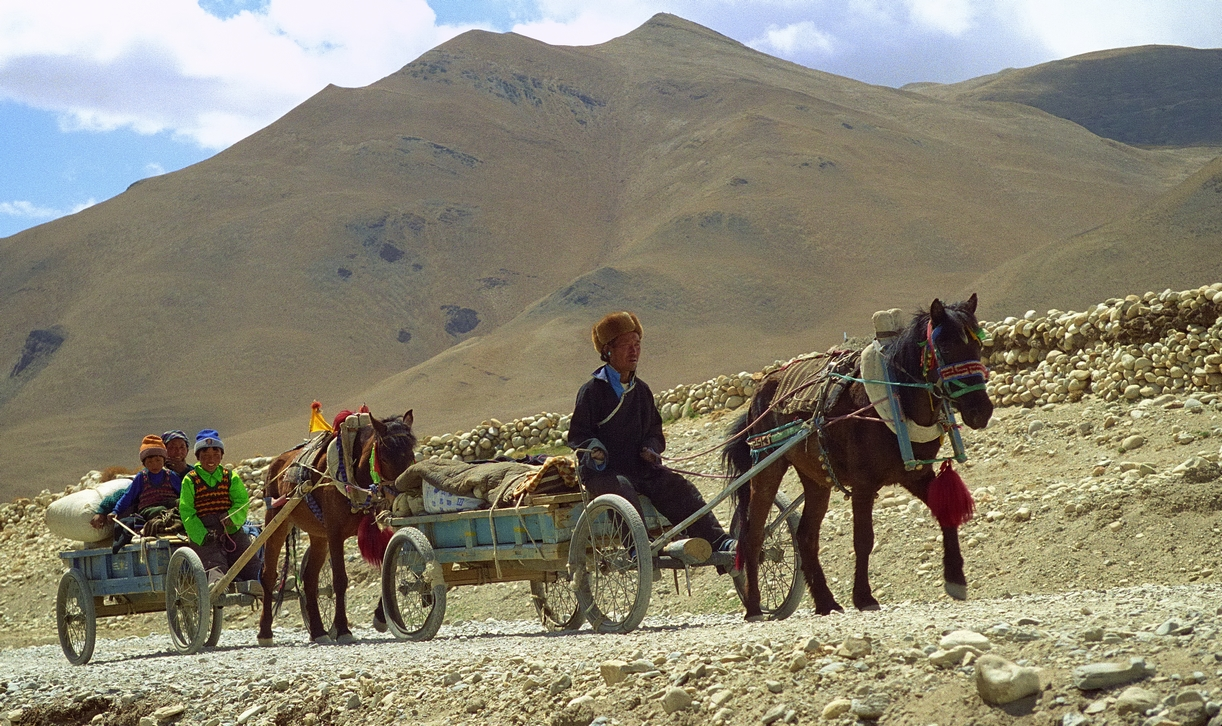
Domestication of mammals provided society with power for transport.

Human uses of mammals include both practical uses, such as for food, sport, and transport, and symbolic uses, such as in art and mythology. Mammals have played a crucial role in creating and sustaining human culture. Domestication of mammals was instrumental in the Neolithic Revolution's development of agriculture and of civilisation, causing farming to replace hunting and gathering around the world, and cities to replace scattered communities.

Mammals provide dairy products and much of the meat eaten by the human population, whether farmed or hunted. They also yielded leather and wool for clothing and equipment. Until the arrival of mechanised transport, domesticated mammals provided a large part of the power used for work and transport. They serve as models in biological research, such as in genetics, and in drug testing.

Mammals are the most popular of pets, with tens of millions of dogs, cats and other animals including rabbits and mice kept by families around the world. Mammals such as horses and deer are among the earliest subjects of art, being found in the Upper Paleolithic cave paintings such as at Lascaux. Major artists such as Albrecht Dürer, George Stubbs and Edwin Landseer are known for their portraits of animals. Animals further play a wide variety of roles in literature, film, mythology, and religion.

A major way that people relate to mammals (and some other animals) is by anthropomorphising them, ascribing human emotions and goals to them. This has been deprecated when it occurs in science, though more recently zoologists have taken a more lenient view of it.

== Context ==
Culture consists of the social behaviour and norms found in human societies and transmitted through social learning. Cultural universals in all human societies include expressive forms like art, music, dance, ritual, religion, and technologies like tool usage, cooking, shelter, and clothing. The concept of material culture covers physical expressions such as technology, architecture and art, whereas immaterial culture includes principles of social organization, mythology, philosophy, literature, and science. This article describes the roles played by mammals in human culture, so defined.

== Practical uses ==
=== Domestication in the Neolithic agricultural revolution ===
Charles Darwin, Jared Diamond and others have noted the importance of domesticated mammals in the Neolithic development of agriculture and of civilisation, causing farmers to replace hunter-gatherers around the world. (Note: Diamond discussed this matter further in his 1997 book Guns, Germs, and Steel.) This transition from hunting and gathering to herding flocks and growing crops was a major step in human history. The new agricultural economies, based on domesticated mammals, caused "radical restructuring of human societies, worldwide alterations in biodiversity, and significant changes in the Earth's landforms and its atmosphere... momentous outcomes".

Diamond observed that the large mammals that were domesticated were unusual in sharing a set of desirable characteristics. They consumed a diet that humans could readily supply; they grew rapidly and gave birth frequently; they had a mild disposition; they were willing to breed in captivity; they had convenient herd dominance hierarchies; and they remained calm in enclosures. Carlos Driscoll and colleagues reached a similar conclusion, observing that "it was intelligently designed changes to the genetic composition of natural biota that made the real tools. In some sense, Neolithic farmers were the first geneticists and domestic agriculture was the lever with which they moved the world." Driscoll and colleagues list recurring characteristics of domesticated mammals as "dwarfs and giants, piebald coat color, wavy or curly hair, fewer vertebrae, shorter tails, rolled tails, and floppy ears or other manifestations of neoteny."

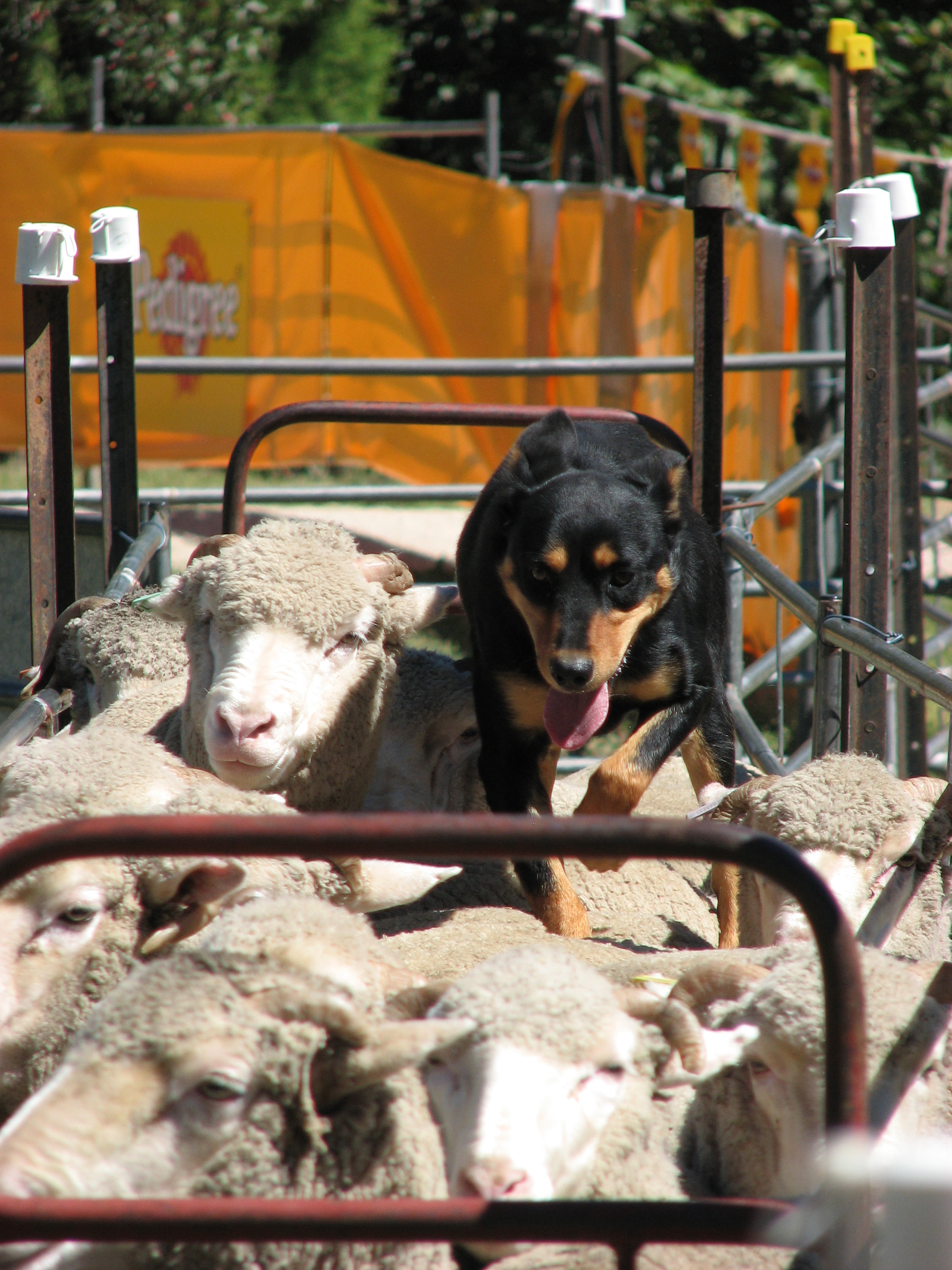
Dogs and sheep were among the first animals to be domesticated.

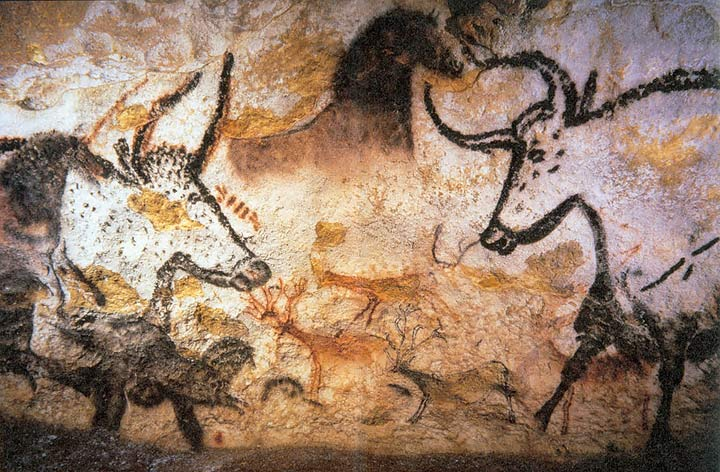
Upper Paleolithic cave painting of aurochs, horses and deer, Lascaux, c. 17,300 years ago

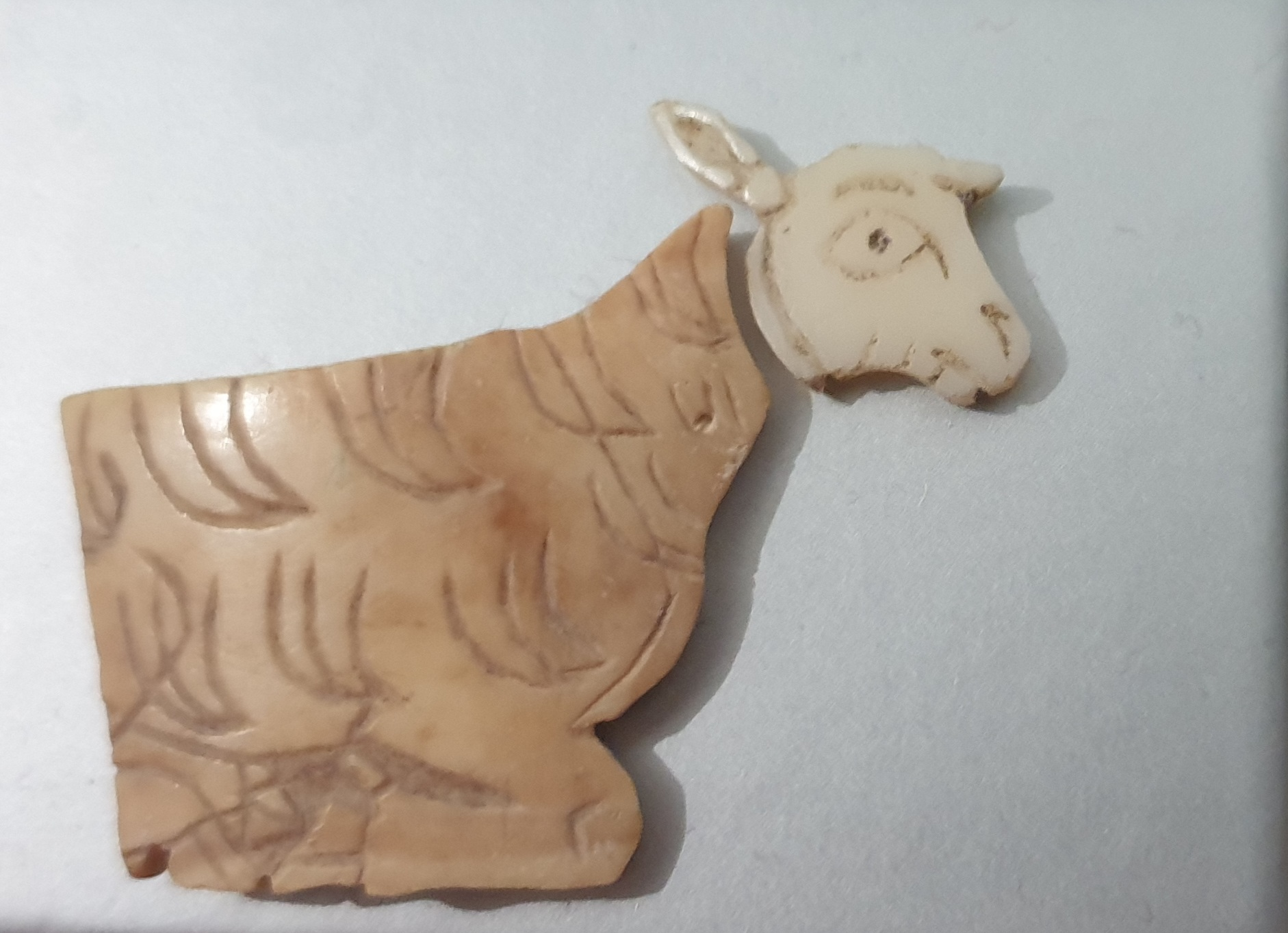
Shell inlay fragments forming the body and head of a sheep, Sumerian, c. 27th–24th century BC

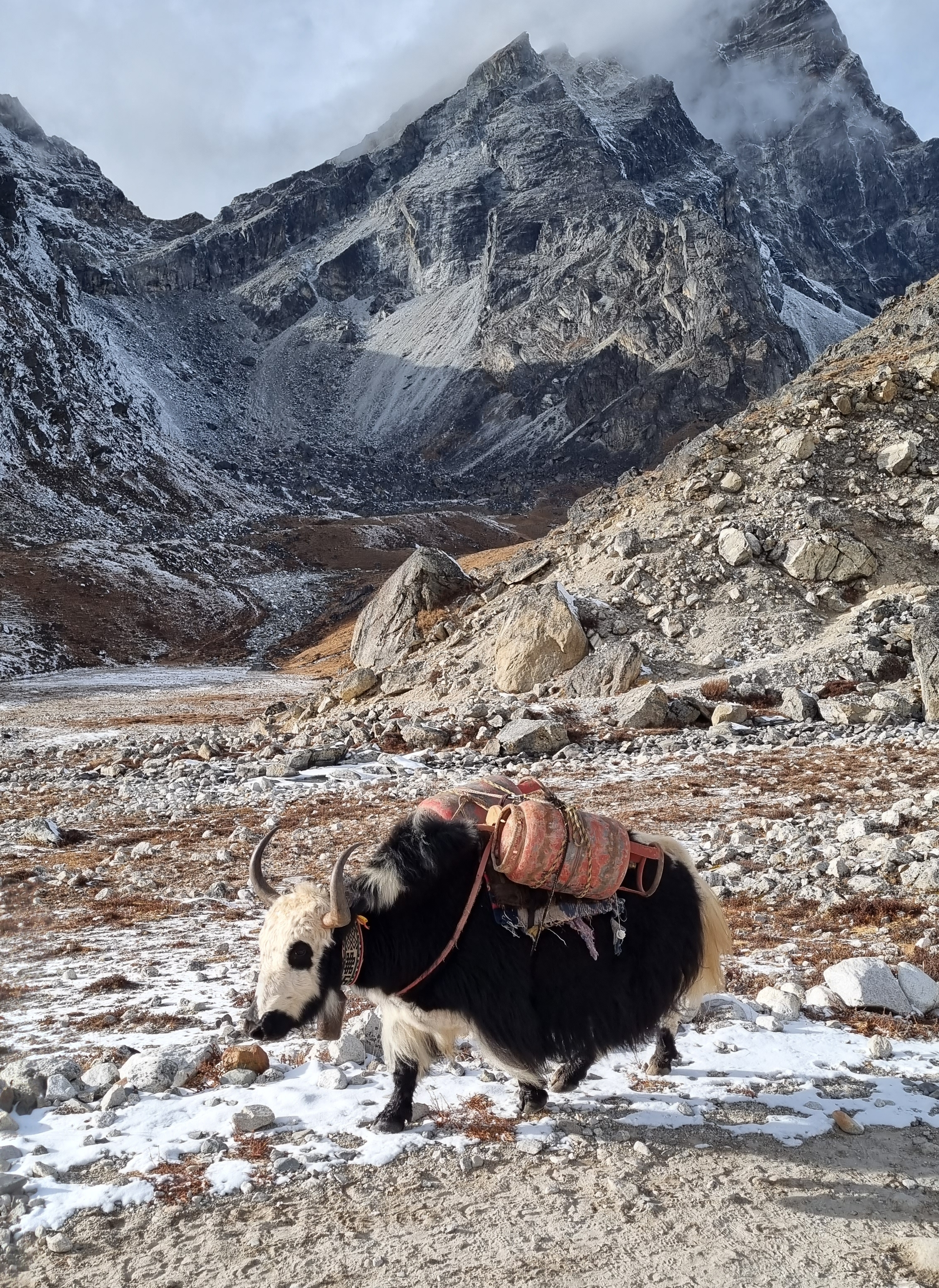
A domestic yak carrying equipment up to the Everest Base Camp

=== For food and other products ===
Humans and their livestock make up more than 90% of the biomass of all terrestrial vertebrates, and almost as much as all insects combined. Mammals form a large part of the livestock raised for meat and dairy products across the world, whether intensively farmed or by more or less mobile pastoralism. They include (2011) around 1.4 billion cattle, 1.2 billion sheep, 1 billion domestic pigs, and (1985) over 700 million rabbits.

Cattle provide a large part of the leather used for clothing products such as shoes, handbags and belts, as well as for upholstery. Wool has been used for centuries for clothing including suits and tweed jackets as well as knitwear such as pullovers. The primary source of wool is sheep, but goats provide angora and cashmere, and alpacas provide a luxurious fleece.

=== For work and transport ===
Working domestic animals including cattle and horses have been used for work and transport from the origins of agriculture, their numbers declining with the arrival of mechanised transport and agricultural machinery. In 2004 they still provided some 80% of the power for the mainly small farms in the third world, and some 20% of the world's transport, again mainly in rural areas. In mountainous regions unsuitable for wheeled vehicles, pack animals continue to transport goods.

=== In science ===
Mammals serve a major role in science as experimental animals, both in fundamental biological research, such as in genetics, and in the development of new medicines, which must be tested exhaustively to demonstrate their safety. Millions of mammals, especially mice and rats, are used in experiments each year. A knockout mouse is a genetically modified mouse with an inactivated gene, replaced or disrupted with an artificial piece of DNA. They enable the study of sequenced genes whose functions are unknown. A small percentage of the mammals are non-human primates, including the grivet, the rhesus macaque, and the crab-eating macaque, which are used in research for their similarity to humans.

=== As pets ===
Mammals are the most popular pets in the Western world, with the most kept species being dogs, cats, and rabbits. For example, in America in 2012 there were some 78 million dogs, 86 million cats, and 3.5 million rabbits. There is a tension between the role of animals as companions to humans, and their existence as individuals with rights of their own.

=== For sport ===
Mammals, including deer and wild boar, are among the game animals most often hunted for sport and for food. Predatory mammals, most often dogs, are used to help catch game, and to retrieve shot birds. Mammals are widely raced for sport, often combined with betting on the outcome, especially in horse racing and greyhound racing.

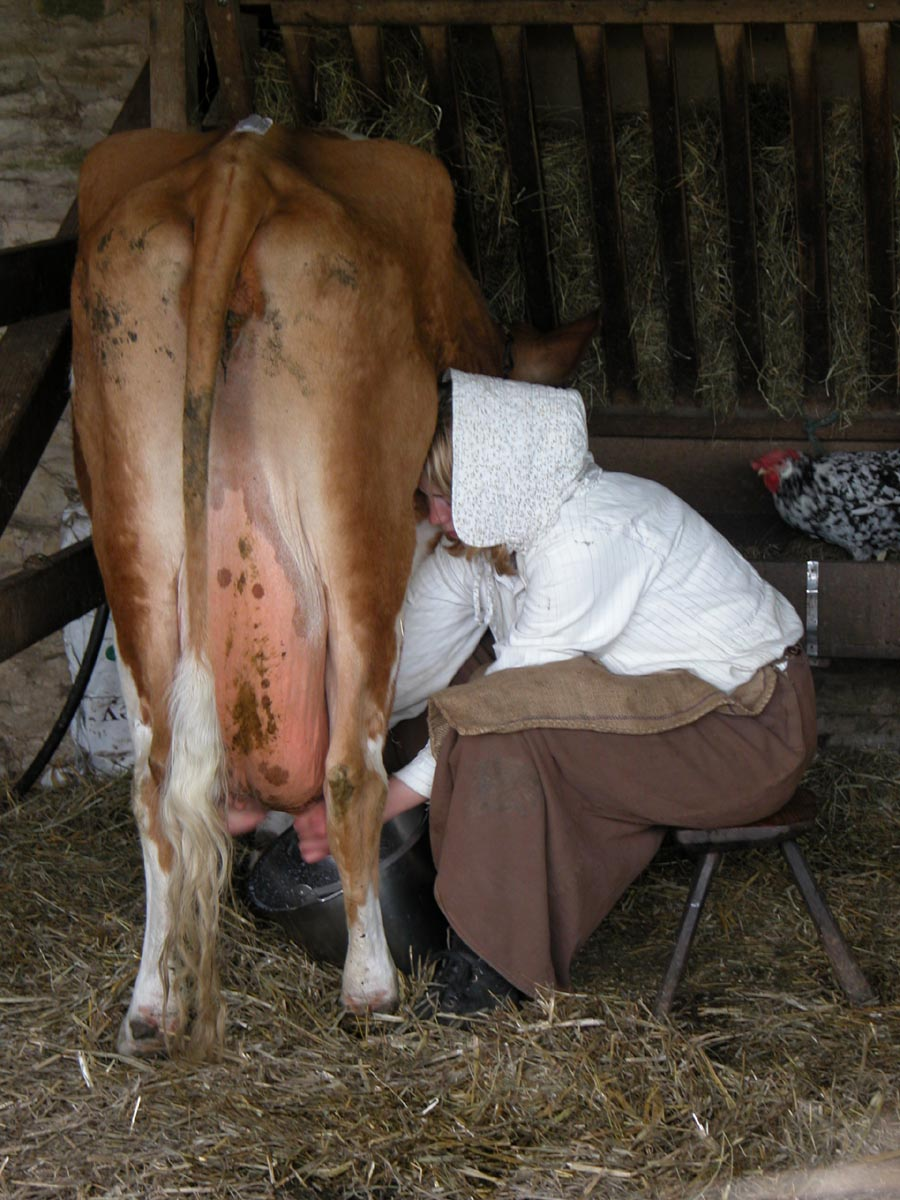
Cattle have been kept for milk for thousands of years.

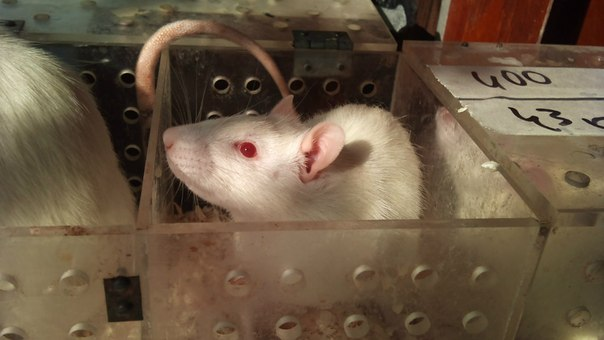
A laboratory rat in a Skinner box

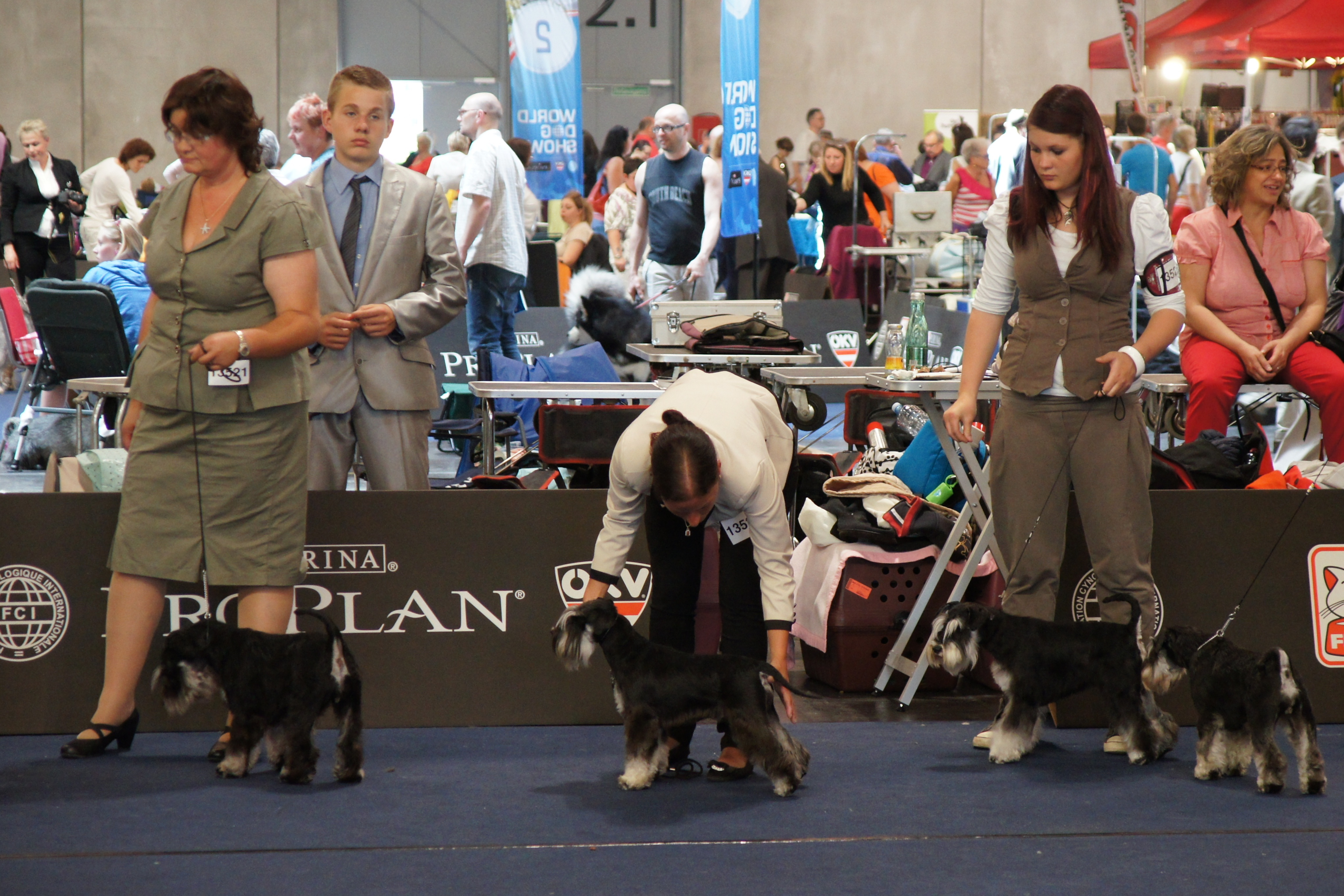
Pet owners and their dogs at the World Dog Show, 2012

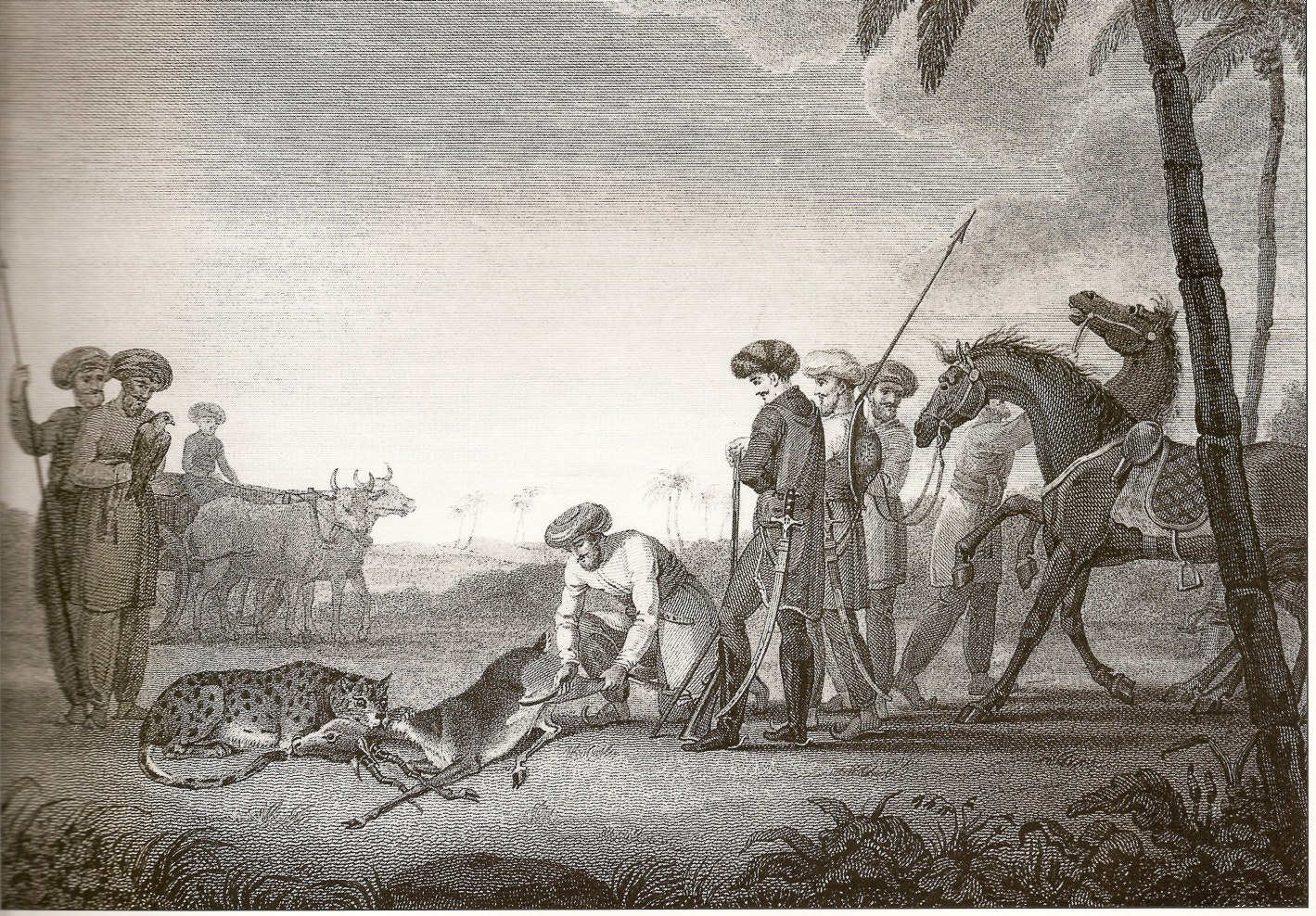
Mughal hunters using a cheetah to catch a blackbuck, Gujarat, 1812. Illustration by James Forbes

== Symbolic uses ==
=== In art ===
Mammals have been the subjects of art from the earliest times, both historical, as in Ancient Egypt, and prehistoric, as in the cave paintings at Lascaux and other sites in the Dordogne, France and elsewhere. Major animal paintings include Albrecht Dürer's 1515 The Rhinoceros, George Stubbs's c. 1762 horse portrait Whistlejacket, Edwin Landseer's 1851 The Monarch of the Glen, and Henri Rousseau's 1891 tiger in an imaginary landscape, Surprised!.

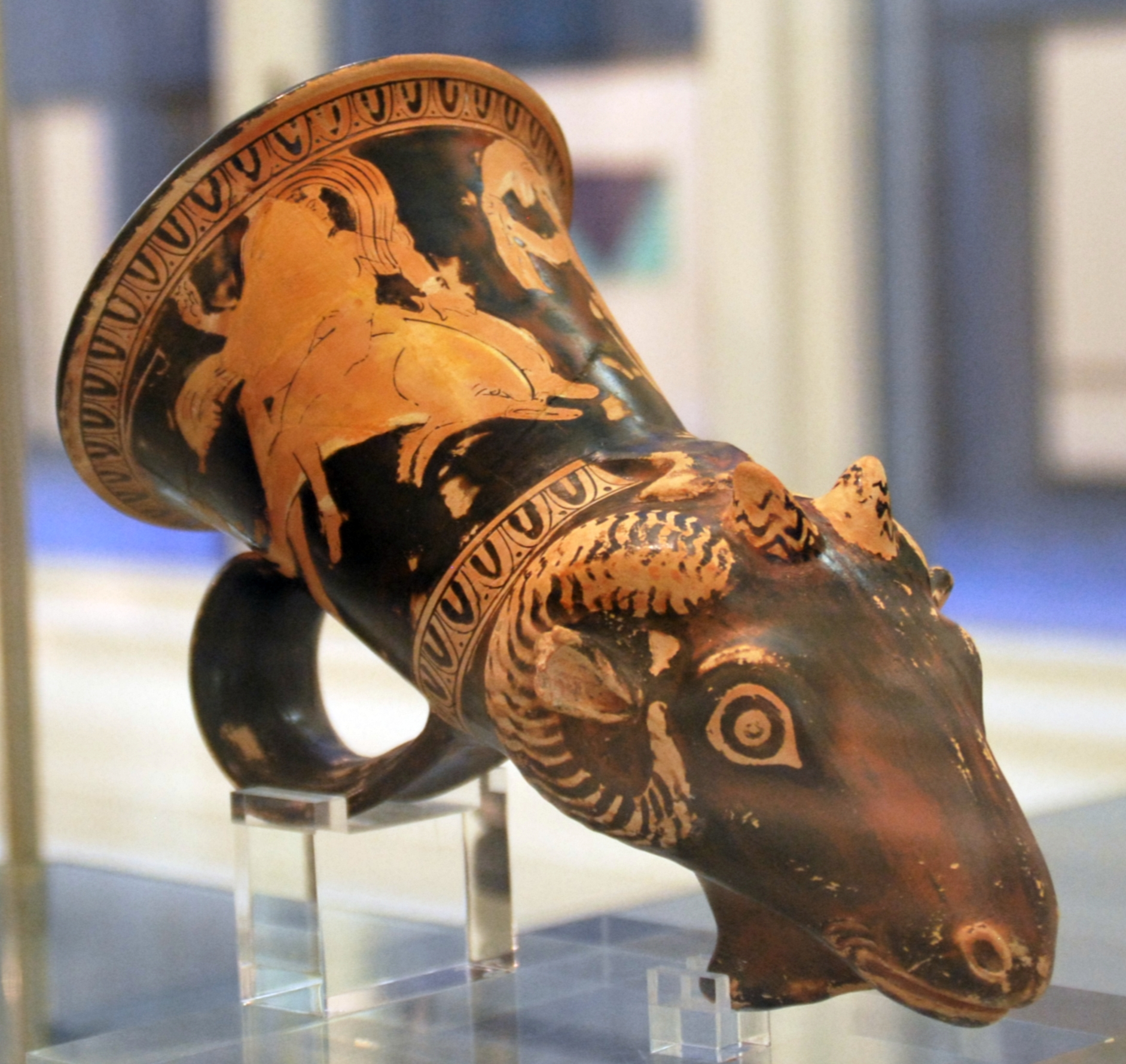
Ancient Greek red-figure ram-head rhyton, c. 340 BC

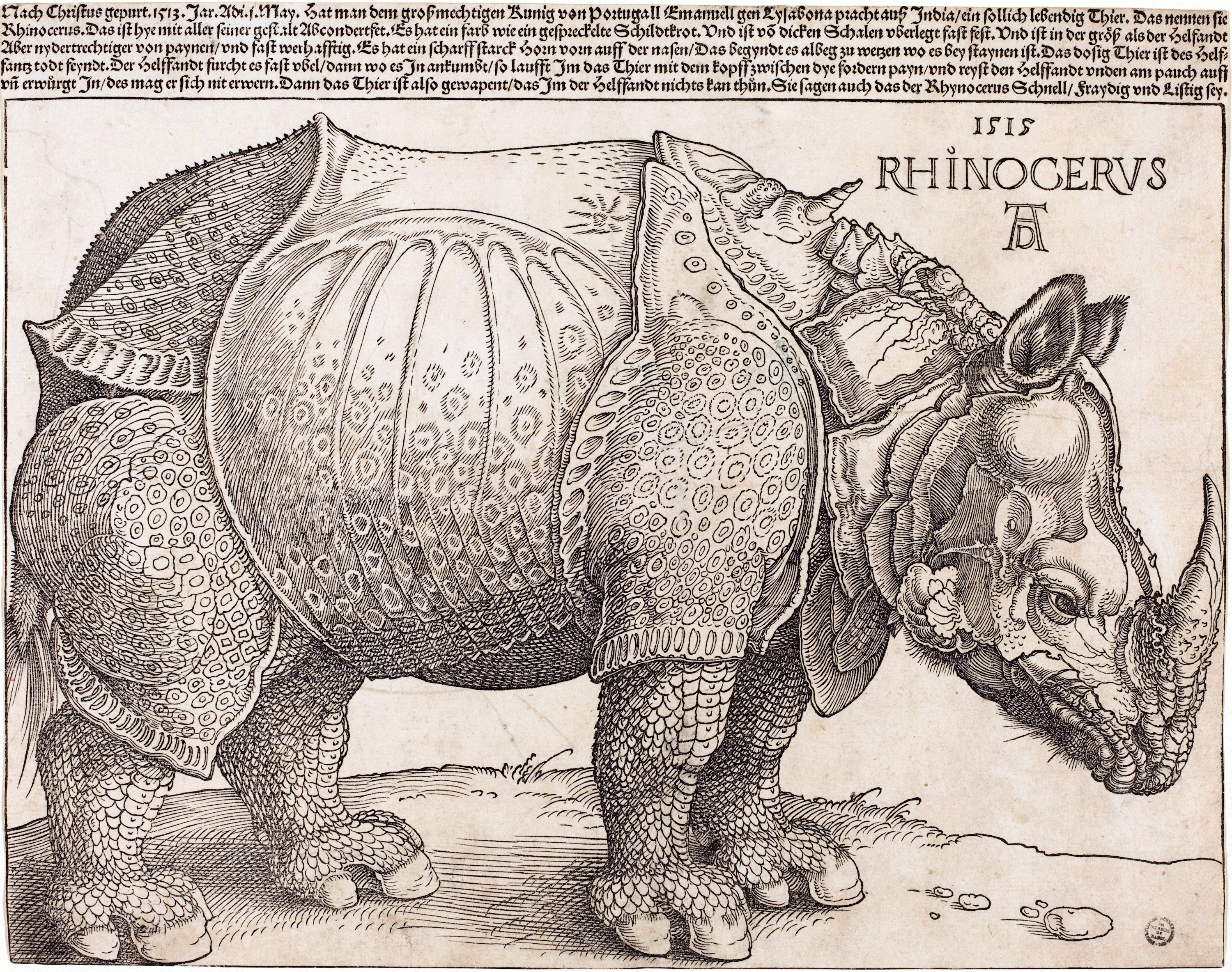
Albrecht Dürer's 1515 The Rhinoceros

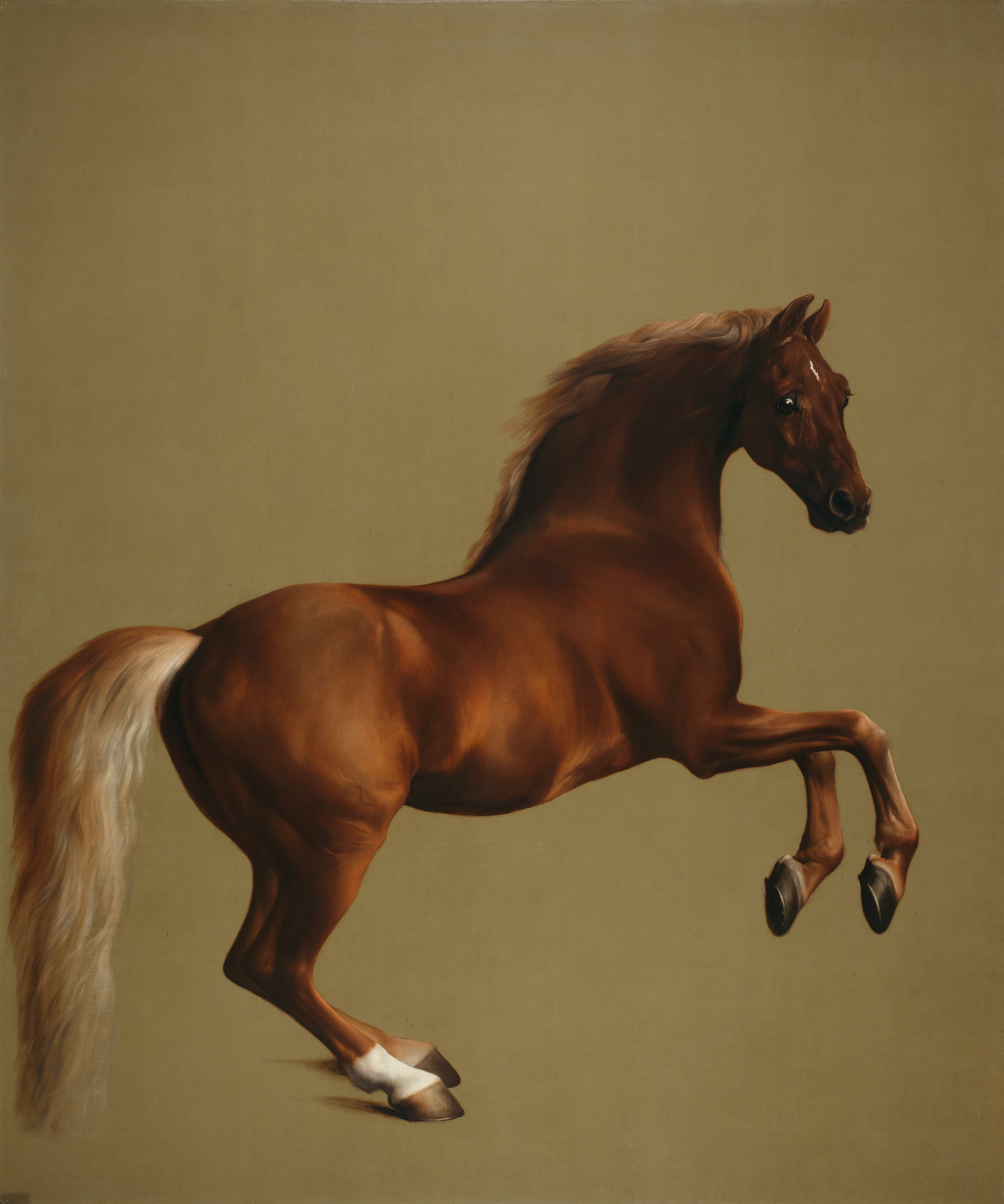
George Stubbs's c. 1762 Whistlejacket

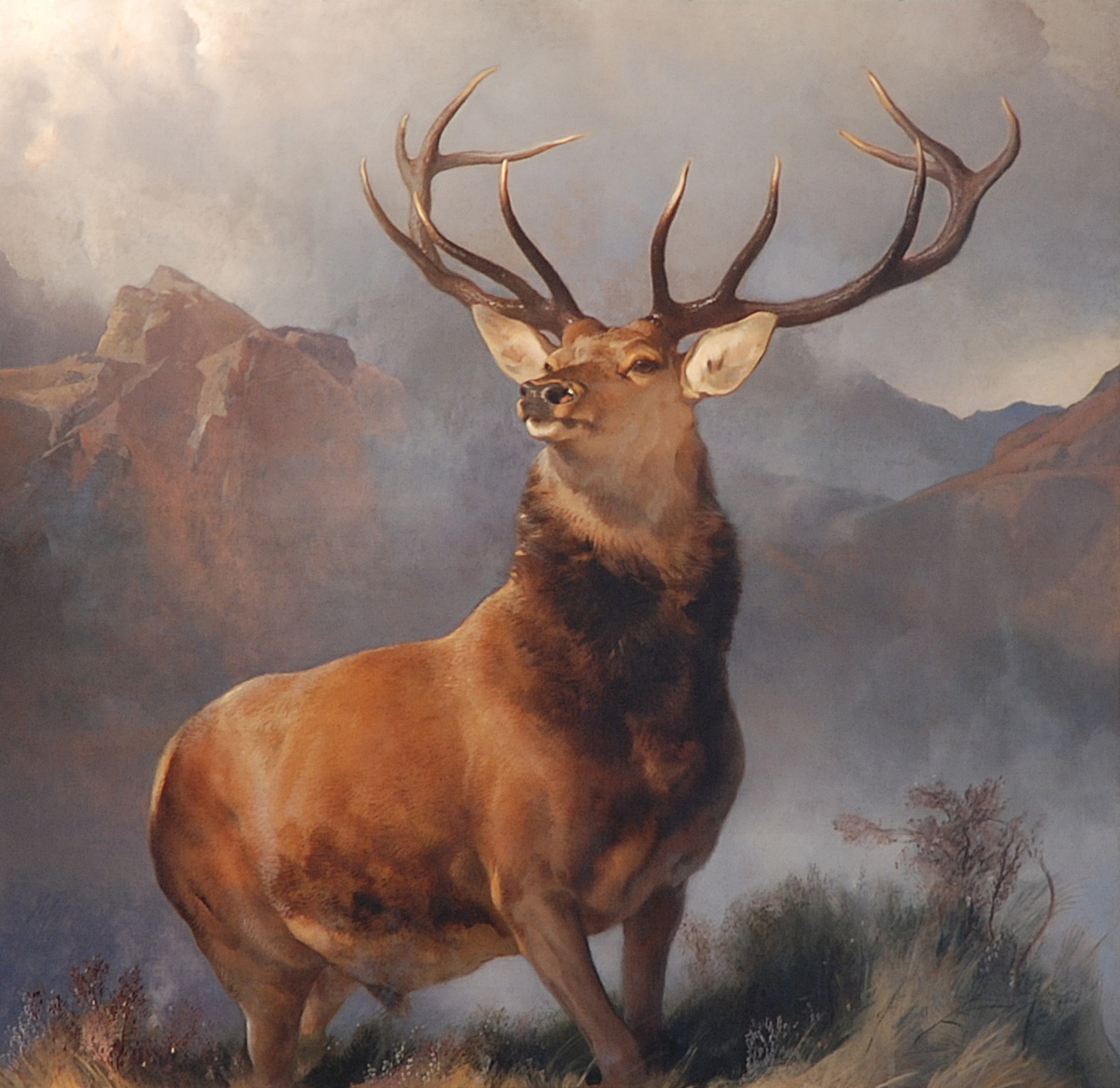
Edwin Landseer's 1851 The Monarch of the Glen

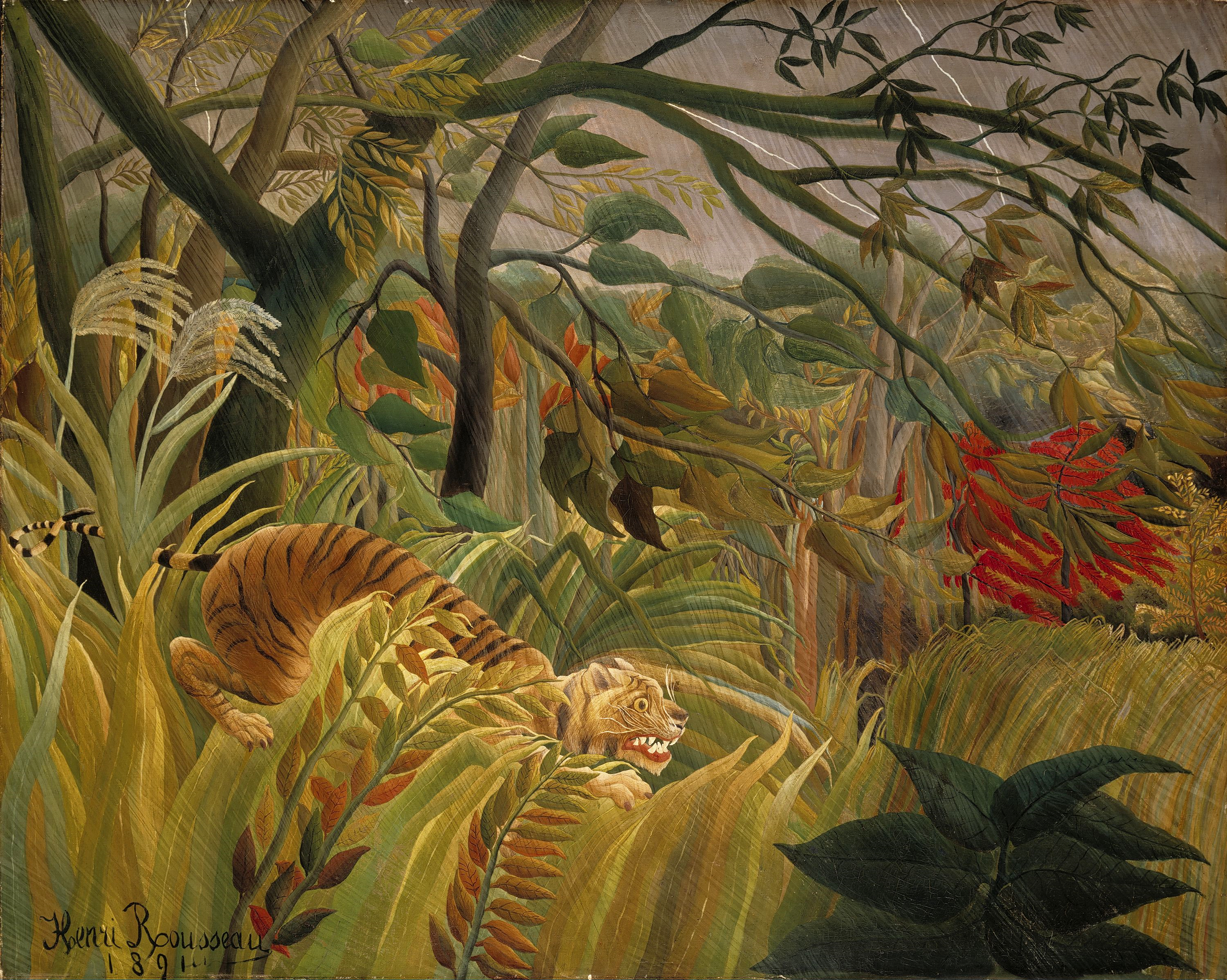
Henri Rousseau's 1891 Surprised!

=== In culture ===
Mammals including cattle, deer, horses, lions and wolves, along with creatures derived from them, such as werewolves, figure in mythology and religion. Jacques Cauvin has argued that Neolithic animal symbols, with early art depicting figures such as bull gods, derive from the critical importance of domesticated mammals in that period.

Mammals from mice and foxes to elephants play a wide variety of roles in literature and media including photography and film.

Soft toys often have the forms of juvenile mammals, especially bears. The teddy bear was developed apparently simultaneously by the toymakers Morris Michtom in America and Richard Steiff in Germany in the early years of the 20th century. It was named after the big game hunter President Theodore "Teddy" Roosevelt. The teddy bear became an iconic children's toy, celebrated in story, song, and film.

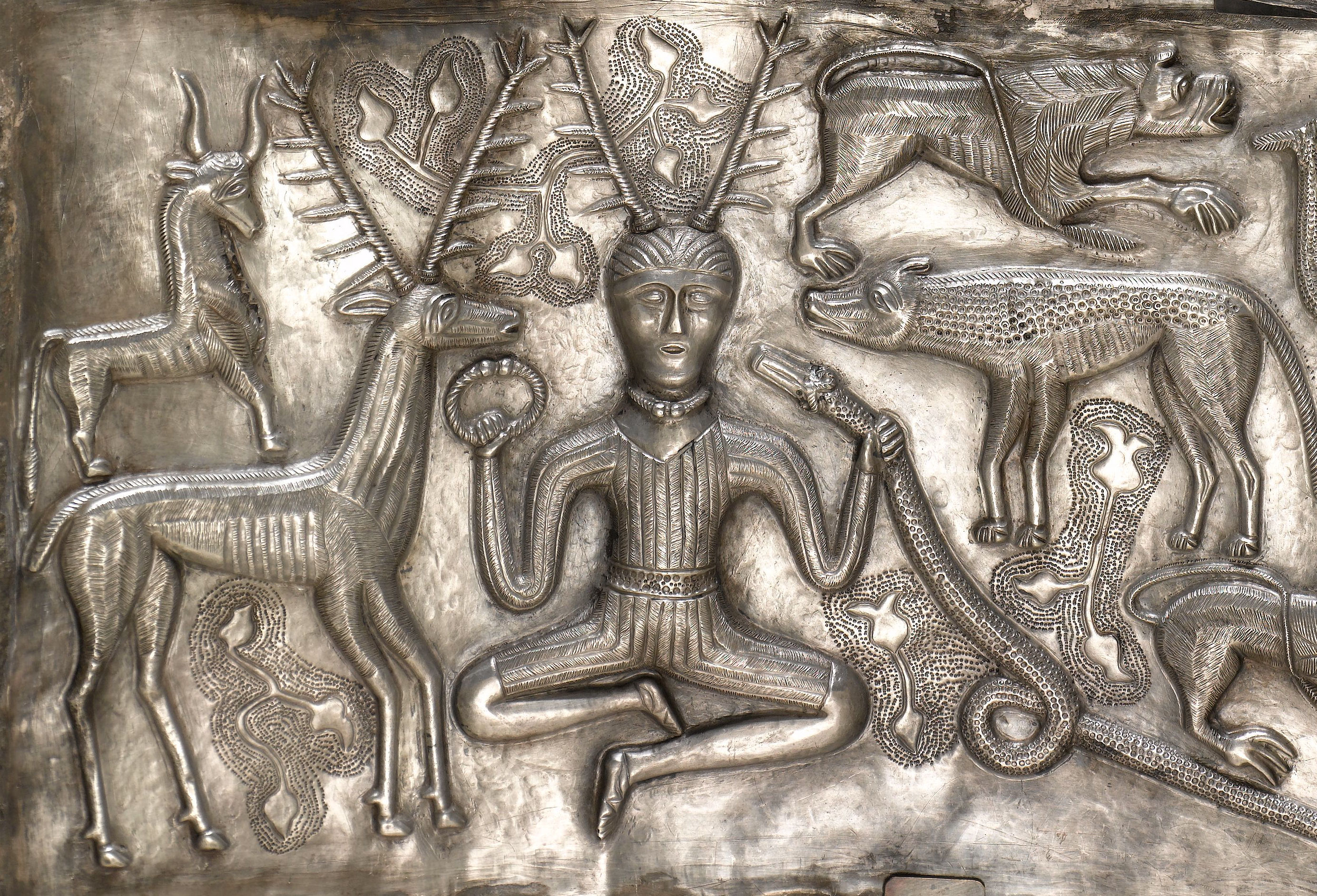
Deer and an antlered figure from the Gundestrup Cauldron, 1st or 2nd century BC

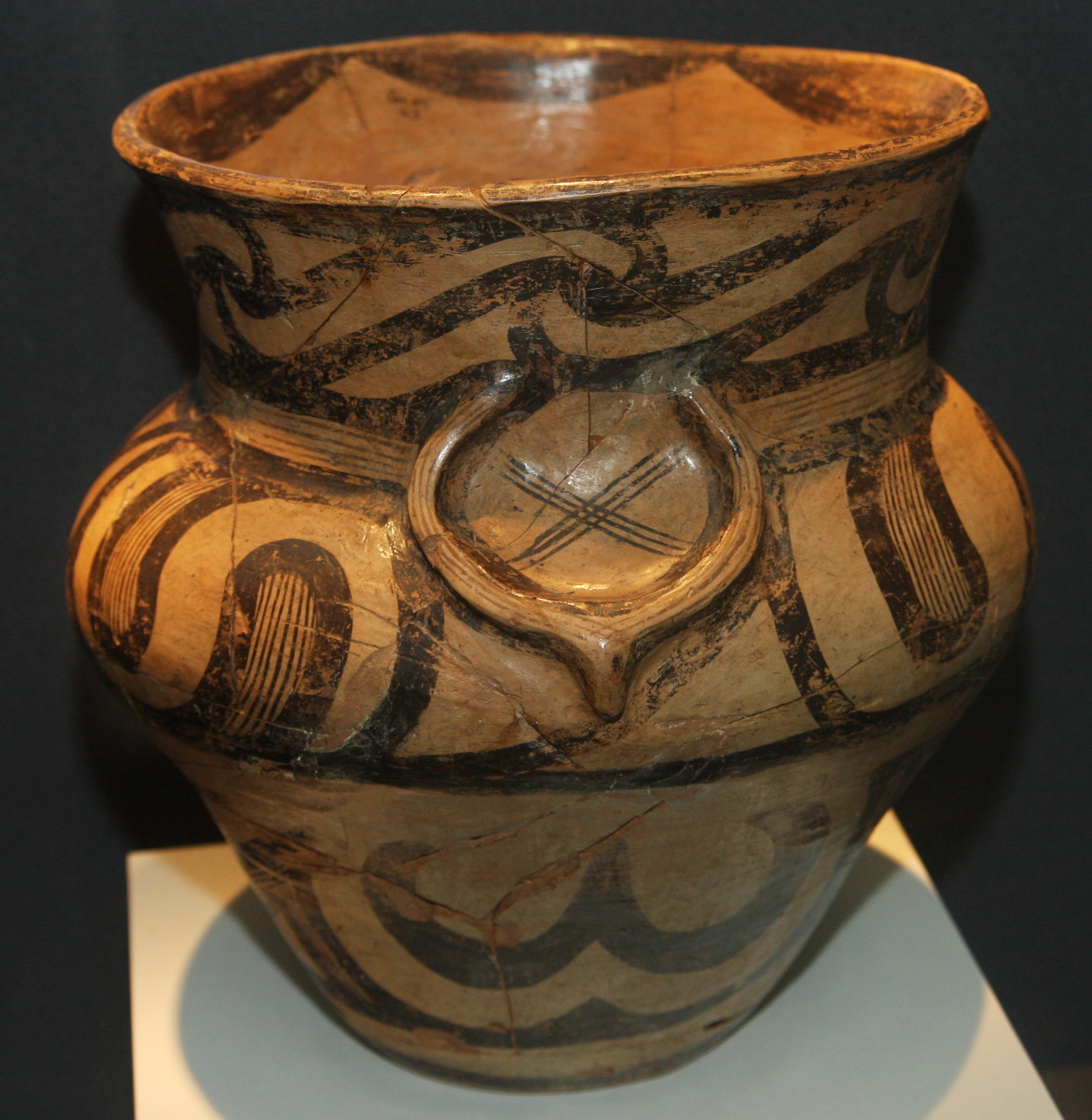
Representation of bull horns in Cucuteni culture pottery

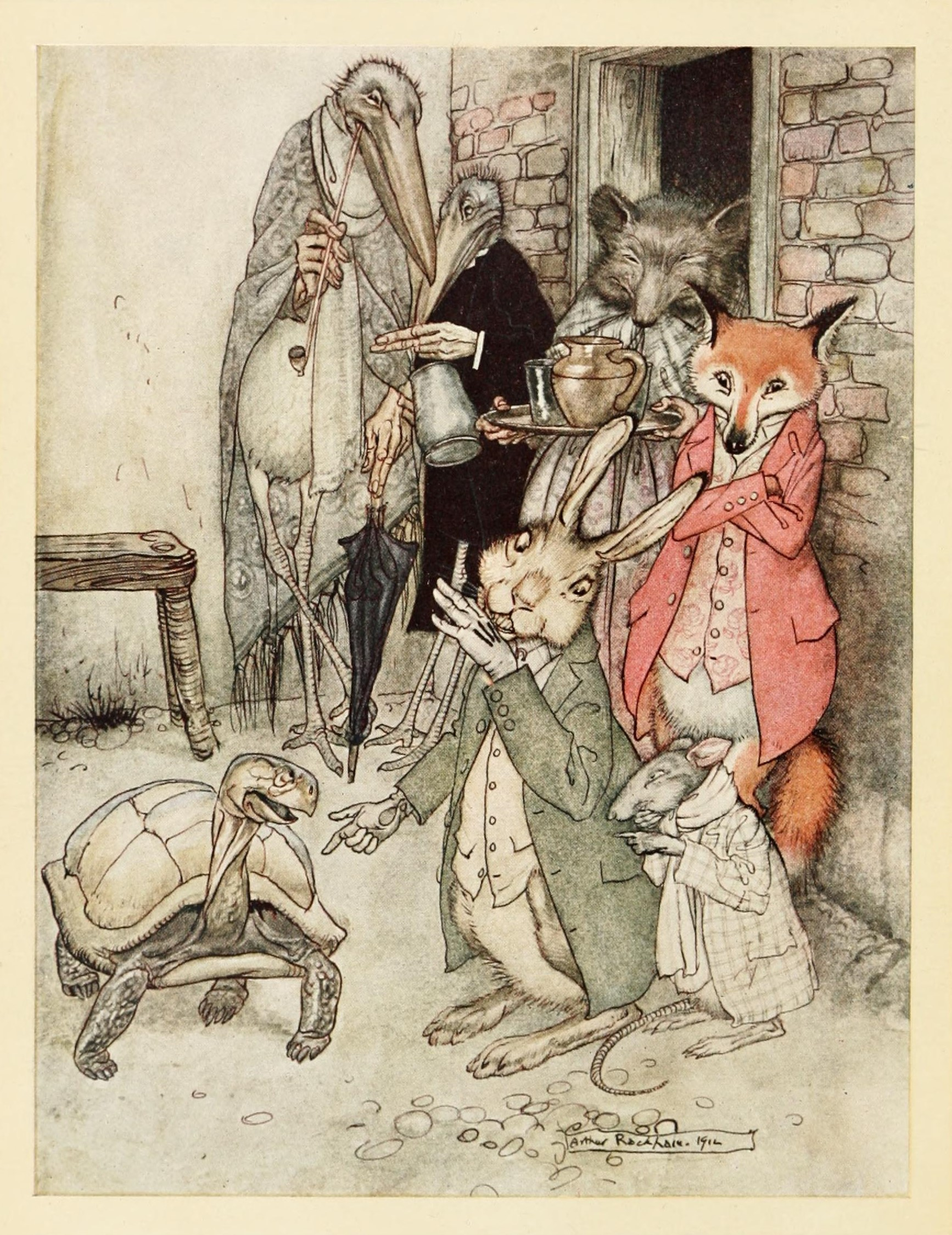
Animals dressed as humans in "The Tortoise and the Hare", from an edition of Aesop's Fables illustrated by Arthur Rackham, 1912

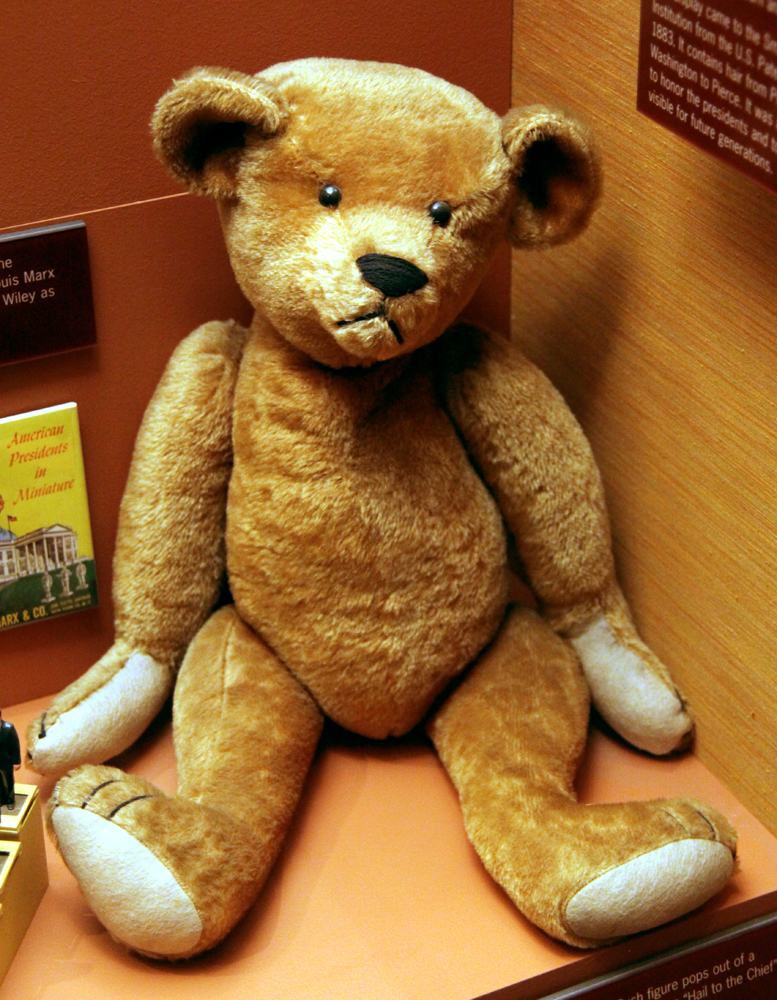
An original 1903 teddy bear, made by Benjamin Michtom

== Attitudes towards animals ==
Anthropomorphism, the attribution of human traits, emotions, or intentions to non-human animals, most commonly to mammals, is an important part of the way that people relate to mammals. Attitudes and behaviour to animals ranges from cruel to sentimental.

=== In popular culture and the arts ===
In literature, fables such as those of Aesop have been told to teach wisdom through intentional fictions about characters such as apes, asses, bears, cats, sheep, deer, dogs, foxes, hares, horses, lions, and mice. Anthropomorphic children's literature became popular from the nineteenth century with works such as Lewis Carroll's 1865 Alice's Adventures in Wonderland and Rudyard Kipling's 1894 The Jungle Book. In the twentieth century, many of the most popular works for children have anthropomorphic characters, including Beatrix Potter's 1901The Tale of Peter Rabbit, Kenneth Grahame's 1908 The Wind in the Willows, and C. S. Lewis's The Lion, the Witch, and the Wardrobe in all of which the animals, mainly mammals, wear human clothes and have human attributes of character.

=== In science ===
Anthropomorphic language, implying the existence of intentions and emotions in animals, was deprecated for most of the 20th century, as indicating a lack of scientific objectivity. In 1927 Ivan Pavlov wrote that animals should be considered "without any need to resort to fantastic speculations as to the existence of any possible subjective states". In 1987 The Oxford Companion to Animal Behaviour still advised that "one is well advised to study the behaviour rather than attempting to get at any underlying emotion". Charles Darwin however had accepted the idea of emotion in animals, writing his 1872 book The Expression of the Emotions in Man and Animals on the subject. Darwin believed that mammals had social, mental and moral lives. In The Descent of Man (1871), he wrote: "There is no fundamental difference between man and the higher mammals in their mental faculties."

Biologists remained wary of the idea, even for the great apes, but this led to serious difficulties, as Donald O. Hebb explained in 1946:

A thoroughgoing attempt to avoid anthropomorphic description in the study of temperament was made over a two-year period at the Yerkes laboratories. All that resulted was an almost endless series of specific acts in which no order or meaning could be found. On the other hand, by the use of frankly anthropomorphic concepts of emotion and attitude one could quickly and easily describe the peculiarities of individual animals... Whatever the anthropomorphic terminology may seem to imply about conscious states in chimpanzee, it provides an intelligible and practical guide to behavior.

In the 1960s the three leading primatologists nicknamed "Leakey's Angels", Jane Goodall studying chimpanzees, Dian Fossey studying gorillas, and Biruté Galdikas studying orangutans, were all accused of "that worst of ethological sins – anthropomorphism" as they sought to explain primate behaviour using empathy. The primatologist Frans de Waal summarised the dilemma: "To endow animals with human emotions has long been a scientific taboo. But if we do not, we risk missing something fundamental, about both animals and us."
