= PublicStuff =

Digital communications system for residental issues

- Industry: Software
- Founded: 2010
- Founder: Lily Liu, Vincent Polidoro
- Headquarters: United States
- Products: Digital Communication Systems
- Website: PublicStuff.com

PublicStuff is a digital communications system for residents to submit real-time requests in their neighborhoods. Accessed by traditional web browser, smartphone app, phone, or SMS, residents can use the system to submit issues, such as road maintenance or waste management, and create an issue tracking ticket.

Co-founders Lily Liu and Vincent Polidoro began to develop PublicStuff in 2009 and officially launched the service in 2010.

To date, PublicStuff is used in approximately 250 cities in the United States. In 2015, PublicStuff was acquired by Accela, a San Ramon, CA-based Govtech company.

== Background ==
Liu created PublicStuff after a 10-year career in urban administration positions in California, Washington D.C., and New York City. In a 2013 Forbes Magazine article, Liu was quoted as saying that, "I started really understanding how difficult it was for a city that wanted something that I believe every city should have: the ability to provide great customer service. But it was so difficult and so expensive. There wasn’t anything out-of-the-box, ready-to-go that allowed cities to better communicate with their residents."

Early adopters of the PublicStuff software include Philadelphia, PA and Plano, TX. The company has since added Tallahassee, FL, North Miami Beach, FL, Asheville, NC, Newport Beach, CA, Aurora, CO, Palo Alto, CA, and Daly City, CA, among others.

== Use ==
Local governments generally engage with PublicStuff on a contractual basis. As clients, municipalities have access to a CRM backend that allows staff to manage workflow, and make internal or public comments on resident requests. Municipalities can customize the mobile app experience by, for example, modifying the user interface or adding widgets.

Push notifications enable government officials to alert residents of ongoing events, emergency alerts, and status updates.

PublicStuff is also available in municipalities that are not enrolled in the service. Requests in unsubscribed municipalities, termed "orphan requests," are routed to the PublicStuff staff, who manually route the requests to the correct municipal department.

=== Submitting a request ===
PublicStuff routes location-tagged photographs, written descriptions, and telephone-reported issues to relevant municipal departments and then relays status and outcome back to the user who filed the request. Users can monitor issue status and add comments to request additional information.

=== One Voice ===
PublicStuff's One Voice technology translates from 16 different languages, allowing residents that speak English as a foreign language to more easily submit requests.

== Funding ==
Prior to acquisition, PublicStuff raised $6.55 million in funding from FirstMark Capital, the Knight Foundation, Lerer Ventures, First Round Capital, and High Peaks Venture Partners.

== Achievements ==
In 2014, Forbes listed PublicStuff at #85 on its list of America's Most Promising Companies.
