= Murat Aktihanoglu =

American venture capitalist

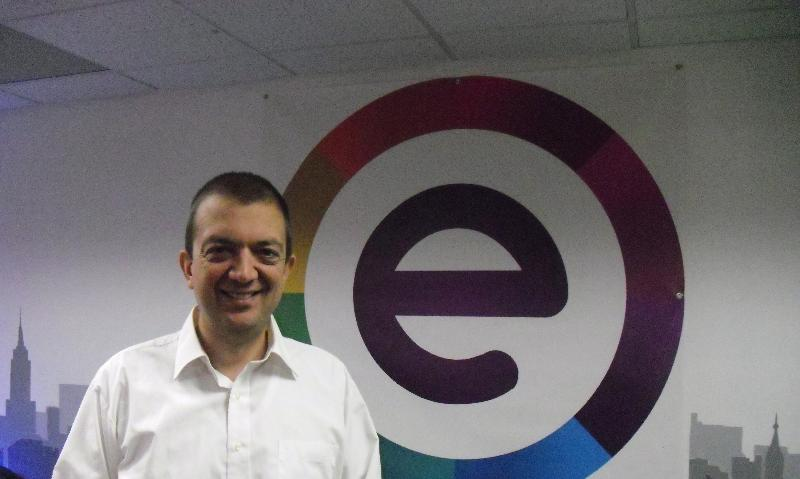
- Education: Bilkent University
- Occupation: Venture Capitalist
- Employer: Managing Partner at Entrepreneur's Roundtable Accelerator
- Known for: Gezi Protests

Murat Aktihanoglu is an American venture capitalist who is notable for helping create the fastest political crowdfunding campaign in history for Turkish Gezi Protests. Aktihanoglu helped create a crowdsourced and crowdfunded advertisement in the New York Times with Oltac Unsal and Duygu Atacan. It was the fastest political crowdfunding campaign in history. The ad featured demands for "an end to police brutality"; "a free and unbiased media"; and "an open dialogue, not the dictate of an autocrat." The editing of the final advertisement involved thousands of people, and the ad was published on 7 June 2013.

Despite its financing by 2,654 online funders, Turkish Prime Minister Erdoğan and his administration blamed a domestic and foreign "interest rate lobby" and The New York Times for the ad.

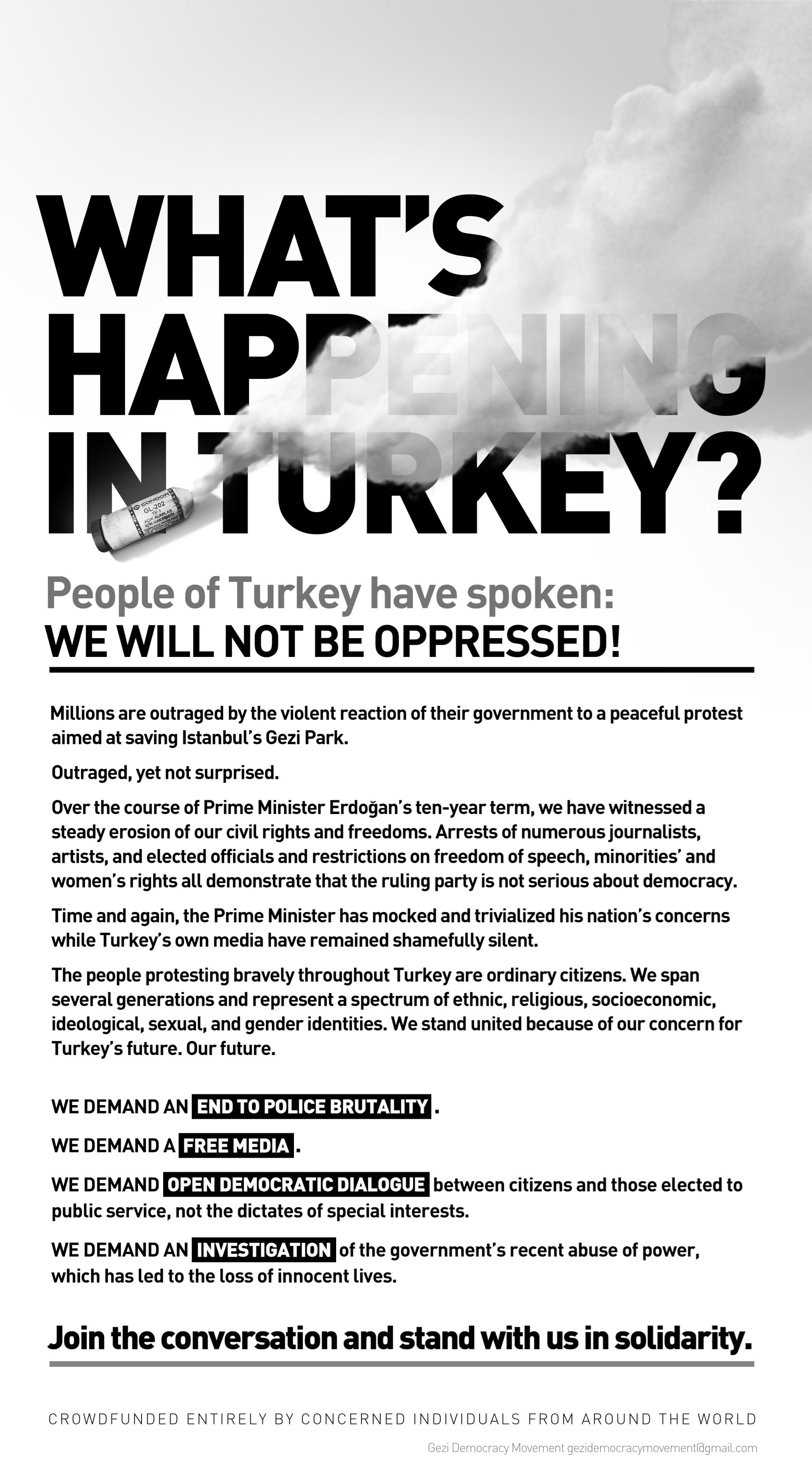
New York Times Ad "What's Happening in Turkey"
