= MusicGremlin =

MusicGremlin was a portable digital music player, as well as a subscription based online music service that could be accessed wirelessly directly from the device without the use of an intermediate computer. Both the player and the service were provided by a small New York based company, MusicGremlin Inc. The company was founded by Jonathan Axelrod and Robert Khedouri. The company was bought in 2008 by SanDisk.

== Device specifications ==
The MusicGremlin, also known as the Gremlin mg-1000, measures 4 x 3.4 x .76 inches, and is currently only available in black. It has a 2-inch QQVGA LCD color screen. It features a standard five-way navigation pad, as well as dedicated volume control buttons. It has an 8GB hard drive, and a battery that lasts 10 hours of playtime.

A fairly unusual feature to the Gremlin is its ability to share licensed music directly with other MusicGremlin players on the same Wi-Fi network, as well as access music directly from the MusicGremlin online service without the use of an intermediate computer. It can also transfer music directly from a personal computer, but only one running Microsoft Windows.

The music player can also play files uploaded from a computer in MP3 or WMA format, but these files cannot be shared with other users.

The retail price of the unit was currently US$249.99.

== Service details ==
The MusicGremlin online service is offered in two forms:

- Subscription service- For $14.99/month USD a MusicGremlin user can download and have access to all the music that they like, and freely share this music with other subscribers. As with previous subscription-based music services, these files expire when you cancel your subscription.
- A la carte - Users can also purchase tracks individually for $.99 USD.
- Gremlists - A unique value-add feature for all subscribers to MusicGremlin's unlimited downloads service. Available in a wide variety of genres and themes, Gremlists are preprogrammed playlists that are automatically, and wirelessly, downloaded to the user's device. Current titles include "Punk Rock Royalty", "Non-Stop 70s", and "Hot Brown's Love Lounge." Users can subscribe (for free) to as many Gremlists as they want, as well as stream them on MusicGremlin.com.

== Reviews ==
- In a Wall Street Journal review, Walter Mossberg and Katherine Boehret said that they liked the player and were impressed by its "fresh approach", but found that it had some "annoying rough edges" that would impede the device's market penetration if unfixed.
- In 2010, Time named the Gremlin MG-1000 one of their "All-TIME 100 Gadgets"
