= Top-line growth =

Sales Growth

Top-line growth is the increase in revenue or gross sales by a company over a defined period and is used to indicate the financial strength of a business and its potential for growth in the future. It is usually measured over periods of one-half or full years and is often reported as a percentage growth compared to the previous year or period. Top-line growth does not accrue across periods, instead it is recalculated based on the performance of the business in a specified reporting period. It is a gross figure that represents economic inflows to the company, prior to the deduction of expenses or changes in equity contributed by the business owners or the investors. Top-line growth is often used as a metric for business growth potential and overall operating performance. In most businesses, it forms an integral part of their strategic planning and a means of assessments for such strategies.

== Calculation ==
Businesses calculate the top-line growth figure using official financial statements, which must adhere to the appropriate accounting standards for the country that the business operates in.

=== Using financial statements ===
The statement of profit and loss, also known as the income statement, for the specific period contains a gross-revenue figure which is located at the beginning of the statement. Expenses are then deducted on the statement to derive the "bottom-line" figure which is a net value. To make top-line growth comparable across periods, a business may use a percentage-change formula to see the amount of growth or decline in the top-line figure.

=== Modelling top-line growth ===
This figure can be modelled into trend lines and graphed. The graphs regarding top-line growth are often then reported to shareholders, or potential creditors, to show the pace of growth or expansion for new and existing businesses. These revenue models (RMs) are influenced by the industry the business operates in, the product it provides and the business environment at the time. RMs are useful to businesses when predicting top-line growth, because they present a forecast of future sales that the business can incorporate into its present and future business strategies. The rate is used to determine business performance and predict future performance.

=== Relationship to bottom-line growth ===
Top-line growth is sometimes thought to be exclusive of bottom-line growth (also referred to as net income), as an increase of gross revenue or general economic inflows to the business is usually associated with greater output and operating expenses, which would decrease the net-figure bottom-line growth at a proportionate rate. Despite the issue of increasing expenses, neoclassical theories link bottom-line growth or profitability with top-line revenue growth. In the past, theorists have determined that sales growth is a function of the rate of profit in an accessible market that contains no restrictions on output. Under these conditions, bottom-line growth is seen to be influencing a business's capital structure decisions. A business is thought to be more likely to invest in projects that drive sales and top-line growth, rather than to save the money in retained earnings.

=== Managerial limitations ===
While useful to business managers, top-line growth is not used in isolation, as it does not indicate how efficient a business is. An inefficient business can generate many unnecessary expenses and costs which could prevent the company from becoming profitable, but it could still potentially report a positive top-line growth figure. The chief sales officer (CSO) of a company is responsible for mediating between factors of growth and expense. The CSO is tasked with the role of motivating the salespeople, creating enjoyable experiences for the customer through efficient business procedures, and capitalising on new growth opportunities. The CSO must answer to the shareholders of their company when reporting on the performance of growth strategies.

== Business Lifecycle ==
Trends in top-line growth can emerge depending on the stage in a business's life cycle. It is known that there are typically four stages in the life of a business: establishment, early growth, later growth, and post-maturity. Throughout this life cycle, businesses can face varying challenges in achieving top-line growth. In the establishment period a business may struggle to grow their top-line due to an unestablished customer base which can prevent extensive sales growth. The early-growth stage can see large top-line growth as the business may have developed a growing network of customers. During the later-growth stage, the business may see their top-line growth slow down or stop as the business has grown and expansion strategies plateau. New products may be introduced in this phase, to continue top-line growth. During the final stage, the most stable, the business relies on its established network and assets to maintain a healthy and maintainable top-line growth figure.

=== Small Business Revenue ===
Small businesses have historically experienced greater operational risk and more varied levels of top-line revenue growth. Some small businesses can experience more volatility due to their smaller customer base and limited revenue streams. The top-line growth of these businesses can be greatly impacted by broader economic conditions, as a small change in customer base can represent a large proportion of future revenue. Sustained top-line growth for a small business can signal business expansion, increased size, and profitability.

== Practical business applications ==
Businesses use the top-line growth rate to inform their decision-making regarding cost-cutting and sales techniques. Managers will analyse the top-line growth rate to gain insight into how everyday business operations are performing. If they do not meet predetermined targets set by the business, new strategies for increased growth—higher sales turnover, and pricing—may be considered to improve the trend.

=== Goal-setting ===
Traditionally, companies will tend to set growth (top-line) and cost-cutting (bottom-line) targets simultaneously to make sure they optimise their profit margins and maximise the economic benefit of their revenue growth. Growth can bring extra costs, so businesses emphasize cost-cutting to capture the benefits of top-line growth. Businesses often report their top-line growth to shareholders when they have recently implemented a growth strategy to determine if it has been successful.

=== Top-line growth as a key performance indicator ===
Performance management is popular among public and private businesses. Some managers view key performance indicators (KPIs) as a way to increase the effectiveness of their management strategies. KPIs are predetermined, interrelated targets given to members of staff, to help them in achieving the broader objectives of the business. Companies can align these goals with critical success factors (CSFs). CSFs are procedures implemented to improve sales during operations. A company's reliance on CSFs can be determined by sudden dips in top-line revenue growth and help a business achieve its KPIs. A KPI of increased sales can be implemented to achieve the business goal of top-line revenue growth. Such KPIs allow the manager to measure business progress at an incremental level to allow for assessment and change in moving forward.

== Strategies ==
Over time, many popular theories regarding top-line growth strategies have emerged, each reflecting the popular business attitudes of their respective eras. Two main schools of thought have been identified: expansion into emerging markets and meeting unmet consumer demand in developed countries. Businesses can use a combination of these strategies to make their revenue streams more diversified and therefore achieve a more sustainable top-line growth trend. A diversified growth strategy is popular, and businesses believe it will protect them in times of economic collapse or radical innovation in the marketplace. Incremental top-line growth can be achieved using sales tactics or through seasonal demand, but businesses do not see this as a sustainable way to maintain a positive top-line growth trend.

=== Expansion into emerging markets ===
The strategy of expansion into emerging markets was popular during the 1980s due to globalisation, the Westernisation of many countries, and developments in technology. This strategy is considered the traditional approach to top-line growth and infers that a global expansion is necessary to grow the top-line exponentially. Statistically, the top 500 non-financial companies in the US have historically improved their top-line growth by expanding into emerging markets to capture sales momentum above the GDP growth of developed nations. This strategy to improve top-line growth is mostly applicable to businesses with large capital budgets and the extensive infrastructure in place to facilitate a physical or online global expansion. This approach to top-line growth is usually adopted by companies who are not already operating in many locations, as they then have room left to expand into. This strategy can be viewed as less helpful for large global companies who have already dominated emerging markets, or perhaps sell a product that generates no demand in emerging markets.

=== Meeting unmet consumer demand ===
In contrast, a recent strategy is that for businesses to sustain high top-line growth in a globalised economy they should invest in research and development leading to innovation to target unmet consumer demand in their established markets, instead of investing to establish new markets in emerging economies. Increased competition domestically and overseas forces businesses to capture top-line growth by capitalising on a shift in consumer behaviour or preferences. Businesses can invest in research activities and data analytics through loyalty programs to gain market insights or identify trends and the increased demand resulting from such trends.

=== Innovation approach ===
A strategy closely linked to "meeting unmet consumer demand", innovation requires the development of new products and services that will be cutting-edge and face no established competitors in the marketplace. Managers face the challenge of enacting new creative business models and preserving established revenue streams that are essential to maintaining the top-line revenue. For these managers, human resources are key, as they can contribute to conceptualising new business ideas and executing them effectively. An innovation approach to top-line growth is said to be most suited to established businesses with large capital expenditure capacities, due to the large amount of research and development costs incurred.

=== Consumer-behaviour approach ===
The consumer-behaviour approach to sustaining or increasing top-line growth focuses on establishing a unique point of customer service to meet the unmet demands of consumers in established markets. By analysing the needs, wants, and psychological motivations of the consumer, businesses can tailor their marketing and product offerings to increase sales. The chief marketing officer (CMO) will create a strategy to capture consumers in all revenue streams. These streams consist of the acquisition of new customers, extra sales from previous customers, and returning business of old customers, all of which can theoretically increase the top-line growth of a company.

== Top-line growth for nonprofit entities ==
Top-line growth is also measured by entities that do not operate purely for profit. Such entities include nonprofit (NPO), such as non-government (NGO) and charitable organisations. These entities do not operate to deliver high returns to shareholders; instead they aim to service the community and achieve their "mission". Among NPOs, top-line growth is a tool to implement their services rather than an end goal, due to their charitable nature.

=== Sources of top-line growth for non-profit organisations ===
NPOs engage in revenue-seeking behaviour by establishing government subsidies, corporate donations and partnerships, and private donations. The strategies to grow their top-line revenue are unique, as NPOs rely on external bodies to fund their operations. Business-relationship management and marketing are strategies commonly used by NPOs to achieve these goals.

=== Top-line growth uncertainty ===
The operations of NPOs rely on income from major donors. If this top-line revenue growth is uncertain, managers can view the future of the NPO as uncertain. NPOs have reported instances where concerns of revenue growth have become the primary function of the business and undermined their mission.
