= New York Angels =

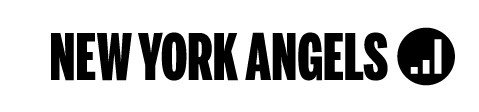
- Industry: Venture capital
- Headquarters: New York, New York
- Products: Venture capital
- Website: www.newyorkangels.com

New York Angels is an organization of seed capital angel investors that provides equity capital for early stage companies, primarily in the field of technology and new media. It is based in New York City.

Founder Rose and former chairman Brian Cohen each serve as New York Angels chairman emeritus, with Mark H. Schneider as chairman, and Elizabeth Lindsey as executive director.
