= Found =

Found may refer to:

== Arts and media ==
=== Visual art ===
- Found object, art created from undisguised, but often modified, objects or products not usually considered art

=== Film and television ===
- Found (2012 film), an American horror film
- Found (2021 film), an American-Chinese documentary
- Found (TV series), an American procedural drama series
- Found (Shameless), an episode of the American TV series Shameless
- "Found" (NCIS: Los Angeles), a 2010 TV episode

=== Literature ===
- Found (novel), a 2014 young adult novel by Harlan Coben
- Found, a 2008 young adult science fiction novel by Margaret Peterson Haddix
- Found Magazine, a publication of collected ephemera

=== Music ===
- Found (Push Play album), 2009
- Found (Seventh Day Slumber album), 2017
- Found, a 2013 album by Rival Schools
- Found (band), an experimental pop band from Edinburgh, Scotland
- "Found" (song), a 2016 song by Dan Davidson

== Other uses ==
- Found (horse), Irish-trained thoroughbred racehorse foaled in 2012
- Found (Rossetti), an unfinished oil painting by Dante Gabriel Rossetti
- Found Aircraft, an aircraft manufacturer based in Ontario, Canada
- Katie Found, Australian filmmaker, writer-director of 2020 film My First Summer

== See also ==
- Find (disambiguation)
- Foundation (disambiguation)
- Founding (disambiguation)
