= Ahmed Haitham =

Maldivian politician

- އަޙްމަދު ޚައިތަމް
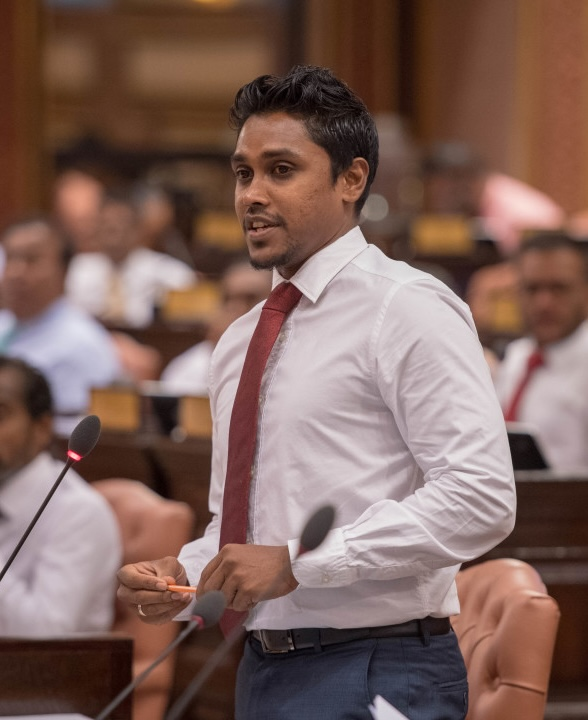
- Haitham in 2019

Member of the People's Majlis
- In office 28 May 2019 – 28 May 2024
- President: Ibrahim Mohamed Solih; Mohamed Muizzu
- Speaker: Mohamed Nasheed; Mohamed Aslam
- Preceded by: Abdulla Sinan
- Succeeded by: Musthafa Hassan
- Parliamentary group: Maldivian Democratic Party; People's National Congress
- Constituency: Machangoalhi South

Parliamentary Group Whip
- In office 2 July 2019 – 29 September 2023
- Parliamentary group: Maldivian Democratic Party

Country Treasurer to the Global Organization of Parliamentarians Against Corruption
- In office 17 December 2023 – 15 July 2024
- Preceded by: Office Established
- Succeeded by: Ahmed Shakir
- Parliamentary group: Maldivian Democratic Party

Personal details
- Born: 17 September 1980 (age 46) Malé, Maldives
- Party: Congress (2023–present)
- Other political affiliations: Democratic (2019–2023)
- Spouse: Shajaan Muaz Shaheem (m. 2020)
- Children: 6
- Profession: Politician
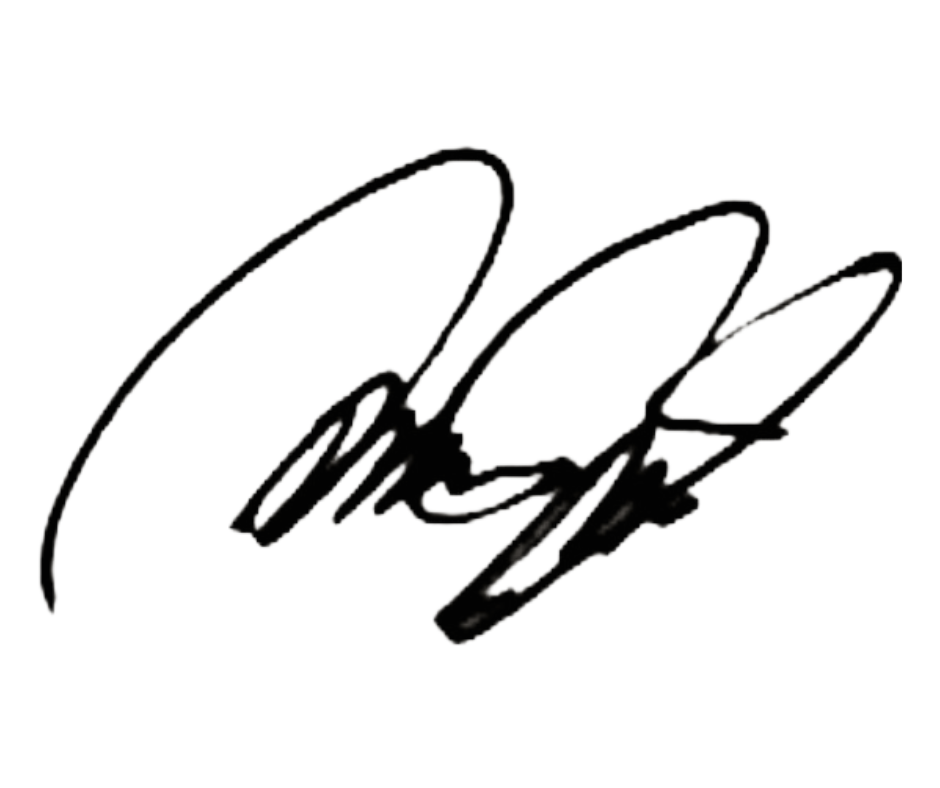
- Signature
- Website: haithamofficial.com

Ahmed Haitham (Note: Also transliterated as Haisam and Khaitham. The Committee to Protect Journalists' 2012 report names him as "Ahmed Haisam" of Minivan Daily.) (/ˈɑːməd ˈhaɪθəm/ AH-maadh-HA-ai-THAAM; Dhivehi: އަޙްމަދު ޚައިތަމް; born 17 September 1980) is a Maldivian politician and a former parliamentarian, known for his advocacy in social justice, child welfare, and anti-corruption efforts. He is a former member of the People's Majlis representing the South Machangoalhi constituency. (Note: The constituency's name is also written Mahchangolhi Dhekunu, Machchangolhi South and Machangoalhi South in English-language sources.) He was elected in 2019, serving until 2024. In 2023, amidst internal party discord, he resigned from the Maldivian Democratic Party (MDP) and subsequently aligned himself with the People's National Congress. (Note: Elected on the Maldivian Democratic Party ticket in 2019. He left the MDP on 26 September 2023, sat as an independent, and joined the People's National Congress on 28 December 2023.) Haitham was known for his active role in social justice, child welfare, and health-related issues during his tenure. He is credited with orchestrating a Maldivian ban on Israeli passports as well as unveiling high-profile corruption in COVID-19 ventilator procurement, culminating in the ousting of the health minister. On 17 December 2023, during his tenure as a parliamentarian, Ahmed Haitham was elected to the executive committee of the Global Organization of Parliamentarians Against Corruption (GOPAC), serving as the Country Treasurer.

During his tenure in parliament, Haitham held positions in several standing committees and subcommittees, contributing to policymaking on various national and international issues. He was a member of the Foreign Relations Committee, and the Committee on National Security Services. He served as Vice Chair of the Subcommittee of the Joint Committee on Economic Affairs and Environment and Climate Change and the Subcommittee on National Security Services, which addressed the Chagos Archipelago sovereignty dispute. Haitham also chaired two subcommittees under the Committee on Environment and Climate Change, overseeing the Energy Bill and the PLS work of the Climate Emergency Act. These roles encompassed areas such as foreign relations, national security, and environmental policy.

== Early life and education ==
Ahmed Haitham was born on 17 September 1980 in Malé, Maldives. Haitham was born to Aishath Ahmed, an Information and Communication Technology administrative professional, who received the National Service Award from the president of the Maldives for her 46 years of service at the Administration for the Communication Authority of the Maldives on 29 July 2023. Haitham's early education took place at Jamaluddin School and Iskandhar School. He then attended Majeedhiyya School, where he completed his secondary education in 1997, obtaining a G.C.E University of London Ordinary Level Certification.

As a licensed IT professional, Haitham pursued various professional certifications and licenses in the field of network security and cybersecurity. He gained qualifications in systems architecture, network management, and cybersecurity. These licenses complemented his formal education. His professional licenses include Certified Information Systems Security Professional (CISSP), CompTIA Security+, Certified Ethical Hacker (CEH), Cisco Certified Network Associate (CCNA), Certified Information Security Manager (CISM), and Certified Information Systems Auditor (CISA).

Haitham further expanded his expertise beyond technology. In 2015, he obtained a professional license as a Health Coach from the Institute for Integrative Nutrition (IIN), earning a Diploma in Nutrition Wellness & Health. In March 2023, he completed a Program Diploma in Global Governance from the International Business Management Institute (IBMI).

== Early career ==
Ahmed Haitham began his career in the late 1990s in various administrative and technical roles. His professional journey started in 1998 as a Visa Officer at a Private Limited, followed by a position as Human Resources Officer at Maldives Ports Authority from 1999 to 2000. He then worked as an IT Technician at Infotech (2002–2003) and later as an Operations Manager at Island Computers (2003–2004). From 2004 to 2017, Haitham held multiple positions in the IT sector, including roles as Computer Technician at Focus Computers, Computer Engineer at Sinnaps Pvt Ltd, and ICT Engineer at Pan Ocean. During this period, he also served as ICT Manager at Shinetree.

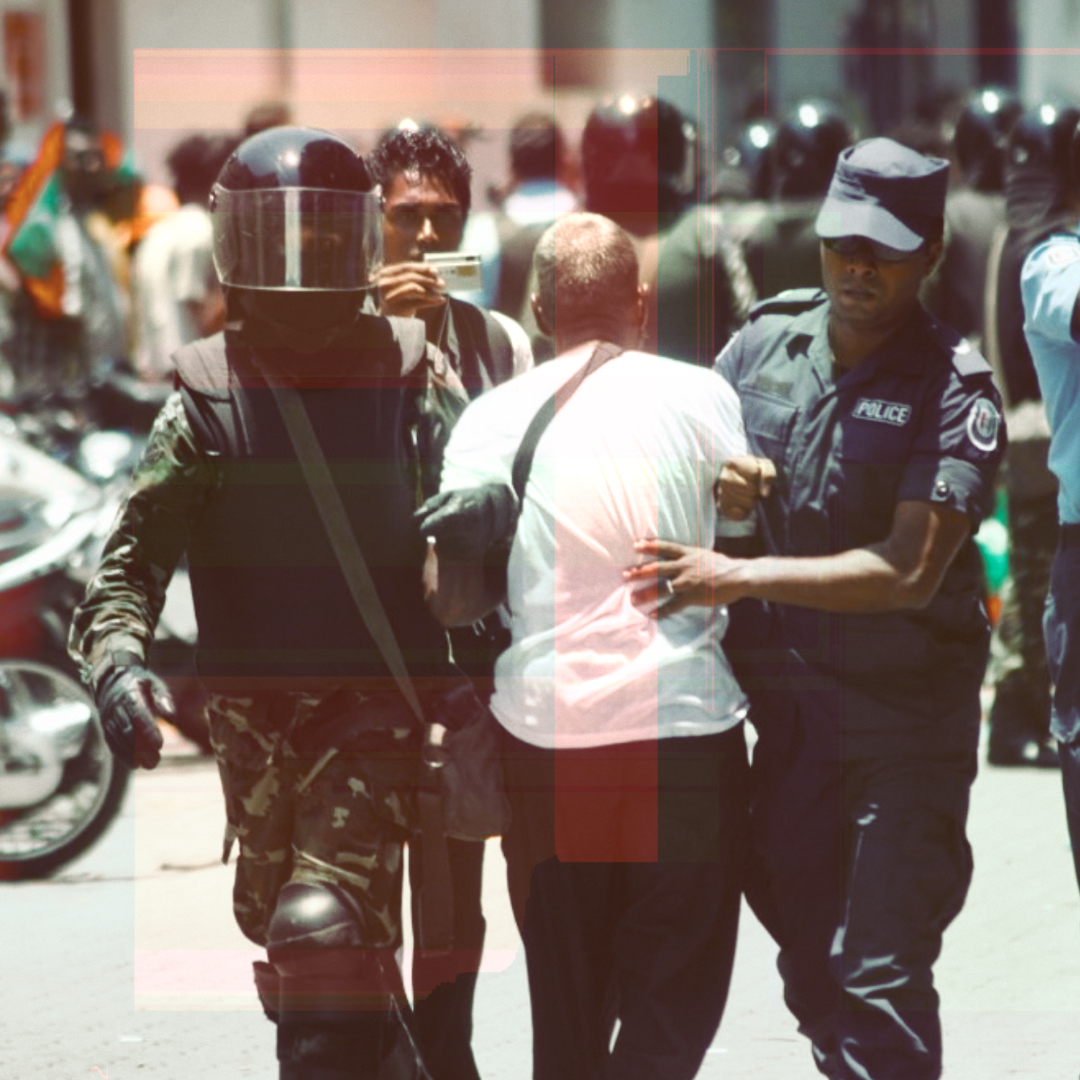
Haitham, captured during his time as a Minivan Daily photojournalist, documenting a protest in 2012.

In addition to his work in ICT, Haitham worked as a photojournalist for Minivan Daily, a publication known for its critical coverage of political and social issues. During his tenure in 2012, he was arrested while covering politically sensitive events in the Maldives. On the eve of 11 July 2012, Haitham was reportedly assaulted by police while covering a protest, an incident that underscored the difficulties faced by journalists during that period. According to media reports, several journalists, including Haitham and Ahmed Shanoon of Raajje TV—who suffered a collarbone injury after being struck with a baton, were targeted while reporting on politically charged events. The period was marked by ongoing challenges to press freedom in the Maldives, with journalists frequently subjected to harassment, arrests, and physical attacks by authorities.

Prior to entering politics in 2019, Haitham established himself as both an entrepreneur and fitness professional. He served as Managing Director of two IT companies: Antimatter Private Limited and Createch Private Limited, both specialising in technology solutions. Additionally, he founded and managed Celestial Private Limited, a company supplying swimming pool chemicals to numerous Maldivian resorts. Beyond his business ventures, Haitham was actively involved in the fitness industry, owning a gym in Malé and working as a health coach and fitness instructor.

== Elections ==
In the MDP primary election for the South Machangoalhi constituency held on 19 January 2019, Ahmed Haitham, represented the Maldivian Democratic Party (MDP), was elected as the Member of Parliament for South Machangoalhi in the 8 April 2019 parliamentary elections, contributing to the MDP's historic landslide victory. The 2019 Maldivian parliamentary election marked the first time a single party secured a supermajority in the People's Majlis, with the MDP winning 65 out of 87 seats.

Haitham's campaign in South Machangoalhi was faced with incidents of vandalism and intimidation. His campaign booth near the Machchangolhi cemetery was damaged, with glass panels shattered and banners removed. Campaign banners across the constituency were also removed, while six bikes, including one used by a member of Haitham's campaign team, were set on fire. Haitham received death threats demanding his withdrawal from the election following these incidents. Despite these threats and incidents, the campaign proceeded. Allegations of an anti-Islamic agenda caused pre-election disunity during Haitham's 2019 campaign.

== Electoral history ==
The 2019 Maldivian parliamentary elections were a pivotal moment in Maldivian politics. Led by president Ibrahim Mohamed Solih and former president Mohamed Nasheed, the MDP's "Agenda 19" campaign emphasised reform and development pledges. The party triumphed in major population hubs, including nearly all seats in Malé, where Haitham's constituency was a key victory. With the MDP's supermajority, the new parliament held unprecedented legislative power, enabling constitutional amendments and judicial reforms. Haitham's election from South Machhangoalhi symbolised this transformative shift in Maldivian politics, where the MDP moved to implement its ambitious reform agenda.

2019 South Machangolhi parliamentary election
Party	Candidate	Votes	%
MDP	Ahmed Haitham	933	43.2
Independent	Abdulla Sinan	693	32.1
JP	Ibrahim Mamnoon	350	16.2
Independent	Abdulla Leemaan Zahir	96	4.4
Independent	Fuad Thaufeeq	74	3.4
Independent	Ibrahim Shakir	15	0.7
Total votes		2,161	100.0
MDP hold			

Source: Elections Commission (Note: Percentages are of the 2,161 votes cast for the six candidates.)

Haitham won the South Machangoalhi constituency with 933 votes, defeating the incumbent MP Abdulla Sinan who followed with 693 votes, while the remaining candidates, including independent contenders and Ibrahim Mamnoon of the Jumhooree Party (JP), received smaller shares of the vote. Ahmed Haitham took his oath as a parliamentarian of the People's Majlis on 28 May 2019.

On 2 July 2019, Ahmed Haitham was elected as a whip of the MDP during the party's parliamentary group elections.

== Legislative tenure ==
Ahmed Haitham's first noteworthy parliamentary initiative was the proposal to ban single-use plastics in the People's Majlis. Haitham's initiative led to an amendment that resulted in the Maldivian parliament unanimously passing a ban on single-use plastics in the People's Majlis. On 1 July 2019, a resolution to impose a nation-wide ban on single-use plastics was brought to the floor of the Maldivian parliament by the Environment and Climate Change Committee, where Ahmed Haitham served as Vice Chair. The resolution was presented following a special request made by school students urging greater action on environmental protection. This marked the beginning of legislative efforts to reduce plastic waste in the Maldives, with the resolution calling for a reduction in the production of small plastic water bottles, the ban of certain plastic products such as supari packets and straws, and the establishment of alternative solutions for plastic bags, aiming for implementation by 2025.

=== Resolution on undocumented and illegal workers ===
On June 23, 2019, during the 7th sitting of the National Security and Foreign Relations Committee, MP Haitham proposed a resolution addressing undocumented and illegal migrants in the Maldives. He cited that approximately 63,000 undocumented migrants were residing in the country, with total migrant workers estimated between 145,000 and 230,000, constituting nearly one-third of the Maldives' resident population. In his address to the committee, Haitham outlined how this significant demographic shift posed various challenges to national security, economic stability, and social infrastructure. The parliamentary records show that Haitham framed the issue as a potential national security threat, emphasising the need for an accurate count of illegal immigrants and a coordinated response involving key stakeholders. His presentation to the committee, documented in the June 23, 2019 Hansard, focused on several critical factors: the challenges of border security and national oversight due to inadequate documentation, the vulnerability of undocumented workers to exploitation and forced labor, and the Maldives' position on the 'Tier 2 Watchlist' in Trafficking in Persons Report for three consecutive years: 2018–2020.

Mp Ahmed Haitham at the Committee on National Security & Foreign Relations.

He particularly emphasised the implications for the country's tourism industry, which relies on migrant labor. The Hansard further records Haitham's concerns about economic implications. While acknowledging migrant workers as key contributors to economic development, particularly in tourism, construction, and the service sectors, he highlighted how undocumented workers had created parallel economies and widespread fraud in quota issues. He emphasised that the lack of proper documentation and monitoring made it difficult to track individuals within the country, leading to various social and economic challenges requiring immediate government attention.

==== Committee proceedings and stakeholder involvement ====
Throughout late 2019, Haitham led several committee meetings. On August 5, he introduced discussions about optimising the PISCES system for Maldives, following up with further deliberations on September 4. The committee continued its oversight with additional PISCES system discussions on October 28, 2019. During the February 18, 2020 meeting, Haitham emphasised the need for better visibility of individuals' entry and exit status.

==== Impact and aftermath ====
Following Haitham's initiative on June 23, 2019, the government implemented several measures to address undocumented migrants in the Maldives. Then Economic Minister Fayyaz Ismail announced his intention to resign if the issue of illegal expatriates remained unresolved. The Regularisation Program, launched in September 2019, revealed that 90% of applicants lacked passports. By 2023, 43,787 undocumented workers had registered, with 16,351 requests approved and 8,938 workers repatriated. The Special Voluntary Departure Program (SVDP) operated from July 24 to December 31, 2020, registering approximately 12,000 expatriates, with over 6,000 returning to Maldives legally. In 2021, the International Organization for Migration (IOM) established a Migrant Resource Centre (MRC) in the Greater Male' area, and the government launched Immigration Watch for public reporting of violations. By September 2021, approximately 24,000 workers had returned to their countries, with 45.43% of registered expatriate workers either regularised or repatriated. From November 2023 onwards, immigration authorities deported over 4,300 expatriates, with the administration setting a target to deport 5,000 illegal expatriates within a year.

=== Ventilator corruption inquiry ===
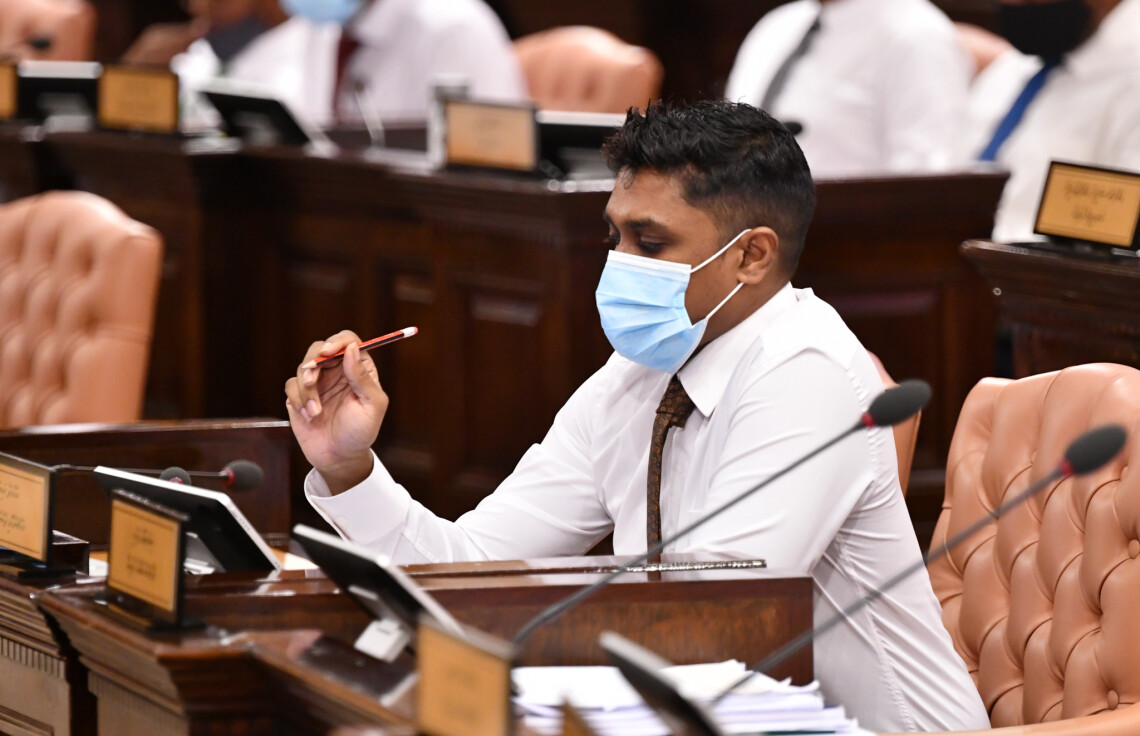
Haitham at the 37th sitting of the parliament.

Haitham initiated an inquiry into the ventilator procurement process during the Maldives' COVID-19 pandemic response. On April 10, 2020, Haitham sent a formal letter to Health Minister Abdulla Ameen, posing ten questions about the procurement of 75 ventilators from Dubai-based Executors General Trading for MVR 34.5 million. The letter sought clarification on delays in ventilator deliveries, the procurement method, the government's strategy to achieve its 200-ventilator target, verification of claims about ventilators in transit, assurances regarding arrivals, and explanations for delays attributed to travel restrictions. Haitham's inquiry was prompted by public concern over lack of transparency and inconsistencies in official statements. The significant public funds involved and reports of only ten non-compliant ventilators being delivered despite a 90% upfront payment raised questions about financial management. This letter marked the beginning of Haitham's efforts to uncover details of the ventilator scandal, leading to a full-scale investigation and political consequences.

==== Response and impact ====
On April 28, 2020, Minister Ameen responded to Haitham's letter, while a notice was sent to minister prior to the response noting that a fourteen-day period is given to respond under Article 74 of the Constitution, the People's Majlis said that the health minister had failed to send a response before this period expired at 2 p.m. on Monday April 27, 2020, response stated that the contracts were awarded to companies with a history of supplying medical equipment to the ministry. Ameen claimed delays were due to global lockdowns and travel restrictions, and that Executors General Trading was recommended by the World Health Organization (WHO). These claims were later contradicted by an audit report. A compliance audit report released in August 2020 revealed that the Health Ministry had not followed regulations in awarding the contract. It exposed that Executors General Trading was not a WHO-recommended supplier, contrary to the government's earlier claims. On August 26, 2020, Ameen responded to allegations, citing the state of emergency and global ventilator shortage as justifications for their actions. On October 14, 2020, the Anti-Corruption Commission (ACC) forwarded charges against eleven health ministry officials, including Minister Ameen, to the Prosecutor General's Office (PGO). The PGO decided not to press charges on October 20, 2020, citing insufficient evidence. In response, on November 2, 2020, the People's Majlis passed a motion to seek a review of the PGO's decision.

==== Aftermath ====
Mp Ahmed Haitham at the 44th Sitting of 3rd Session of 2021, 29 Nov 2021.

Ameen resigned from his position on May 27, 2020, amid criticism over the scandal. The Anti-Corruption Commission (ACC) recommended prosecution of Ameen and health ministry officials for negligence in disbursing funds. However, the Prosecutor General's Office repeatedly declined to press charges, citing insufficient evidence. On February 16, 2023, the government filed a complaint with the Maldives International Arbitration Centre, seeking MVR 32.5 million in compensation for non-delivery of ventilators. Haitham's investigation of a minister from his own government for corruption created tensions within the ruling party then, as President Ibrahim Mohamed Solih declined to address the findings.

=== Bills ===
Haitham sponsored five bills during his tenure, amendments to the Presidential Elections Act (No. 12/2008) in 2019, the Elections Commission Act (No. 8/2008), the Employment Act (No. 2/2008), the Mutual Legal Assistance in Criminal Matters Act (No. 2/2015) in 2023, and the Health Services Act (No. 29/2015), which was sent to the Committee on Social Affairs on 30 April 2024.

=== Resolutions and motions ===
On 8 July 2020 the Majlis accepted Haitham's resolution on child protection, with 68 members in favour, and sent it to the Committee on Human Rights and Gender. It called for more funding, specialist staff, procedures and training for social workers. Presenting it, he called for higher allowances for therapists and social workers so that trained staff would remain in government service.

Mp Ahmed Haitham at the 29th Sitting of 3rd Session of 2022.

On 2 June 2021, after 10-year-old Fathmath Mishka Mohamed of Kulhudhuffushi died of COVID-19 following a delayed ambulance response, Haitham submitted a motion calling for an inquiry into negligence and delays in emergency health services. The Health Ministry opened an investigation into the case its reports were not shared with the Human Rights Commission of the Maldives.

In May 2024 he proposed a resolution calling for a pre-approved visa on arrival and an electronic travel authorisation for tourists, which the Majlis adopted on 14 May 2024.

=== Other legislative work ===
In June 2020 Haitham called for victim blaming in sexual offence cases to be made an offence in law. When a Majlis committee voted on 7 July 2020 to halve import duty on goods including tobacco and e-cigarettes, he submitted an amendment to exclude tobacco and energy drinks from the reduction.

In July 2020, during the Environment and Climate Change Committee's review of the V. Rakeedhoo harbour project, he argued that environmental impact assessments for island harbours lacked long-term monitoring data. He wrote to the Speaker objecting to a planned sewage treatment plant in Hulhumalé, arguing that its design would discharge untreated sewage into the sea, conflicted with the Sewage Disposal Regulation and would use about 15 megawatts of electricity. The Environment and Climate Change Committee took up the matter on 15 November 2021.

In 2021 he submitted written questions to Health Minister Ahmed Naseem.

=== Parliamentary Committees ===
Ahmed Haitham at the Committee on Environment and Climate Change ( 12th Sitting )

Haitham was a member of the Foreign Relations Committee and the Committee on National Security Services (the "241 Committee"). He was elected an MDP parliamentary group whip on 2 July 2019 and held the post until 29 September 2023. He was later elected unanimously as chair of a committee, on the nomination of Meekail Ahmed Naseem, with Ahmed Saeed as deputy chair. (Note: The People's Majlis meeting record of his election does not name the committee.)

==== Environment and Climate Change Committee ====
At the committee's first meeting on 11 June 2019 Haitham was appointed vice-chair, with Hoarafushi MP Ahmed Saleem as chair. On 1 July 2019 the committee brought to the floor a resolution calling for single-use plastics to be phased out nationwide by 2025. Other matters before the committee during this period included a resolution on climate change (June 2019 to February 2020), waste management in the Maldives (July 2019 to October 2020), a resolution to stop the removal of trees and palms from islands (November 2019 to August 2020), Governments planned Hulhumalé sewage treatment plant was stopped due to involvement of corruption, which Haitham raised with the Speaker and which the committee took up on 15 November 2021.

==== Energy Bill ====
The Maldives Energy Bill, a government bill sponsored by Inguraidhoo MP Hassan Ahmed, was sent to the Environment and Climate Change Committee on 8 June 2020. Haitham served on the committee's subcommittee on the bill, and announced on 18 August 2020 that the subcommittee he chaired had completed its mandate and returned the bill to the full committee. The full committee continued its review through 2021, and the Majlis passed the bill on 21 September 2021. President Ibrahim Mohamed Solih ratified it as the Maldives Energy Act (Law No. 18/2021) on 11 October 2021.

==== Climate Emergency Act ====
After the Climate Emergency Act was passed on 29 April 2021 and ratified on 18 May 2021, Haitham served on the three-member Environment and Climate Change subcommittee conducting post-legislative scrutiny of the Act.

==== Joint and other committees ====
Haitham Chairing , Sub Committee of Committee on Environment and Climate Change.

On 8 October 2019 the joint committee of the Economic Affairs and Environment and Climate Change committees, reviewing a bill on pesticides used in agriculture, appointed Haitham to a five-member subcommittee with Ahmed Saleem, Mohamed Rasheed, Ahmed Zahir and Ali Hussain to complete the review within a week; the committee reported on 13 November 2019 (report M19/VC-3/2019/01). He also sat on the joint committee of the Environment and Climate Change Committee and the State-Owned Enterprises Committee, and the joint committee of the National Development and Heritage, Decentralisation and Environment and Climate Change committees.

In the National Security Services Committee he served on the subcommittee examining the President's letter on Mauritius's case against the Maldives at the International Tribunal for the Law of the Sea, concerning the Chagos Archipelago and the Maldives' exclusive economic zone. In the Foreign Relations Committee, his October 2023 request for a ban on Israeli citizens entering the Maldives was considered from 17 October to 15 November 2023.

== Petitions ==
Haitham submitted several petitions from members of the public to the People's Majlis, each of which was reviewed by the Petitions Committee.

=== Tourism workers (2020) ===
Haitham and Mohamed Riyaz, Tourism Petition interview Sangu TV.

On 9 June 2020, as resorts prepared to reopen after closures during the COVID-19 pandemic, Haitham submitted a petition on behalf of tourism workers who had lost their jobs or been placed on unpaid leave. It asked that resorts be required to employ a minimum share of Maldivian staff, that Maldivians be offered vacant posts before foreign applicants, and that resorts not be allowed to reopen until these conditions were met.

The Petitions Committee began work on the petition the next day and met the relevant parties and institutions. Appearing before the committee, Tourism Minister Ali Waheed said that locals made up an average of 47 percent of resort workers, that resorts in breach of employment rules had been ordered to correct them, and that the government aimed to raise the share of Maldivians in the resort workforce to 55 percent. The committee approved its report on the petition unanimously, and completed its work on 13 July 2020.

=== Change NDA 2020 ===
Haitham submitted the "Change NDA 2020" petition, signed by 1,050 people and organised by the NGO Hands Together, which called for better rehabilitation services at the National Drug Agency. The Petitions Committee began reviewing it on 31 March 2021. Its members visited the agency's rehabilitation centres in GDh. Thinadhoo, Fuvahmulah, S. Hithadhoo, HDh. Hanimaadhoo and K. Himmafushi, the Halfway House in Hulhumalé and the Drug Offender Remand Centre in K. Gulhifalhu, and took evidence from the Ministry of Health, the National Drug Agency, the Prosecutor General's Office, the Attorney General's Office, the Maldives Police Service, Maldives Customs, Maldives Immigration, the Ministry of Gender, Family and Social Services and the Ministry of Economic Development.

The committee approved its report unanimously on 15 November 2021. The report, which made ten recommendations, called for a combined approach to drug smuggling, prevention and rehabilitation, and members debating it in the Majlis called for more Maldivian counsellors and training.

=== Israeli entry (2023) ===
On 19 October 2023, after the outbreak of the Gaza war, Haitham wrote to Speaker Mohamed Nasheed asking the Majlis to impose a visa and travel ban on Israeli citizens, and asked the Foreign Relations Committee to consider a boycott of Israeli tourists. Four of the five committee members present voted to refer the matter to the President, citing his authority over foreign affairs under Article 115 of the Constitution, and on 15 November 2023 the committee concluded its work on the issue, deciding to recommend that the government ban Israeli passport holders and imports from Israel.

Haitham, Rights Movement Petition.

On 20 November 2023 Haitham received a petition from the Rights Movement, signed by 1,000 people, calling for a ban on Israeli citizens entering the Maldives; the group said it had collected more than 10,000 signatures in Malé and planned to send the full petition to the President. The Petitions Committee approved the petition unanimously.

On 2 April 2024 the Majlis passed a resolution, moved by Villingili MP Saud Hussain, calling for a ban on the entry of Israeli citizens and on Israeli imports. An amendment to the Immigration Act banning Israeli passport holders, submitted by Meekail Ahmed Naseem in May 2024, was passed after a long delay in committee and ratified by President Mohamed Muizzu on 15 April 2025.

In September 2023, Haitham left the ruling MDP and joined the opposition, following political pressure and threats to his safety.

== Departure from the MDP ==
Haitham Ibu2023 Campaign

Haitham had campaigned door to door for President Ibrahim Mohamed Solih in the first round of the 2023 presidential election. Before the second round, he left the MDP on 26 September 2023 (Note: Some reports date his departure to 28 September 2023, when it was announced; his letter gives 26 September.) in a letter to the party's chairperson, Fayyaz Ismail. In the letter he said the party had departed from its values, and that he had not received support from its leadership on issues he had raised in parliament: undocumented migrant workers, the ventilator procurement during the COVID-19 pandemic, reform of the National Drug Agency, and delays in health care that endangered lives. He wrote that it was best for both himself and the party that he leave. His departure, following that of Fonadhoo MP Moosa Siraj in August, reduced the MDP to 55 seats in parliament. The same week, Abdulla Sinan, whom Haitham had defeated in 2019, joined the MDP. Haitham's term as an MDP parliamentary group whip ended on 29 September 2023.

Haitham then sat as an independent. On 28 December 2023 he was among 13 MPs who signed up to the ruling People's National Congress (PNC), handing their membership forms to President Mohamed Muizzu at a ceremony at Dharubaaruge in Malé. Fayyaz thanked the MPs who had left the MDP for their work and said the party would continue to work to prevent the return of dictatorship.

== Personal life ==
MP Haitham and Shajaan Muaz Shaheem 2022.

Haitham married Shajaan Muaz Shaheem, a Maldivian social and environmental governance advocate, on 15 October 2020. Shaheem is a founder and the board chair of Resilience Maldives, which in September 2025 led a petition against land reclamation near Hanifaru Bay, a co-founder and the secretary-general of the Feline Welfare Organization and, with Haitham, a founder of the Organization for Advocating Travel and Tourism Employees’ Rights, registered in September 2020.

The couple met in 2020 through tourism stakeholder meetings, held online during the COVID-19 pandemic, to prepare for the reopening of the Maldives to tourists on 15 July 2020. After details of the mahr were published, Mihaaru reported that its recorded value of MVR 614,520 was a court valuation of a family heirloom more than a century old, not a cash payment. Their twins, a boy and a girl, were born prematurely in August 2021. Together they have four more children, the family has six children.

== Threats and security incidents ==
During the 2019 campaign a man entered Haitham's campaign office and issued death threats.

On 5 June 2021 Haitham and his wife, who was pregnant with twins, were confronted and threatened on a street in Malé. Police received a complaint against his former wife, Najuma Moosa, and her daughter, Fathimath Dhifla Junaid; Dhifla was accused of using obscene language, threatening Haitham and trying to kick his wife in the stomach. Police forwarded the case to the Prosecutor General on 3 October 2021, recommending charges against both women. The Prosecutor General's Office charged Dhifla at the Hulhumalé Magistrate Court and did not charge Najuma, citing insufficient evidence.

On 28 August 2024, after his term had ended, Haitham's car was destroyed by an explosion while at a garage in Sri Lanka, days after it had been involved in a road collision. Haitham said it was a deliberate attack. (Note: The explosion is listed among assassination attempts survived by Haitham and his wife, Shajaan Muaz Shaheem. Haitham said the car had been set on fire deliberately. It came a month after a bus rammed the car he was driving between Galle and Colombo, and after months in which, his wife said, the couple had been followed and had received death threats. No findings from any investigation have been published.) No findings of an investigation have been published.

== See also ==
- List of people who survived assassination attempts
- 2019 Maldivian parliamentary election
- Maldivian Democratic Party
- People's National Congress (Maldives)
- COVID-19 pandemic in the Maldives – including the ventilator procurement inquiry
- Israel–Maldives relations – the 2023–2025 moves to ban Israeli passport holders
- Global Organization of Parliamentarians Against Corruption
