= Federal Investigation Agency =

Pakistani Federal Law Enforcement Agency

Federal Investigation Agency وفاقی تحقیقاتی نمایندگی
- The emblem of FIA
- Abbreviation: FIA
- Motto: ایمانداری اور سالمیت; Honesty and Integrity

Agency overview
- Formed: 13 January 1975; 51 years ago
- Preceding agency: Pakistan Special Police Establishment (1948)
- Employees: Classified

Jurisdictional structure
- Operations jurisdiction: Pakistan
- Legal jurisdiction: As per operations jurisdiction
- Governing body: Government of Pakistan

Operational structure
- Headquarters: G-9, Peshawar Morr Interchange, Islamabad, Pakistan
- Agency executive: Usman Anwar, PSP, Director-General
- Parent agency: Ministry of Interior

Website
- www.fia.gov.pk

The Federal Investigation Agency (Urdu: وفاقی تحقیقاتی نمایندگی; reporting name: FIA) is a border control, criminal investigation, counter-intelligence and security agency under the control of the interior secretary of Pakistan, tasked with investigative jurisdiction on undertaking operations against terrorism, espionage, federal crimes, smuggling as well as infringement and other specific crimes.

Codified under the Constitution of Pakistan in 1974, the institution functions under the Ministry of Interior (MoI). The FIA also undertakes international operations with the close co-operation and co-ordination of Interpol. Headquartered in Islamabad, the agency has various branches and field offices located in all major cities throughout Pakistan.

== Objectives ==
The FIA's main goal and priority is to protect the nation's interests and defend Pakistan's interests locally, to uphold and enforce criminal law, and law enforcement in the country.

== Structure ==
As of 2022, FIA has 11 active departments to lead criminal charges and investigation, with priorities:

- Anti-Corruption
- Anti Human Trafficking and Smuggling
- Counter-Terrorism
- Economic Crime
- Electricity, Gas, Oil Anti Theft Unit
- FIA Academy
- Immigration
- Interpol
- Intellectual Property Rights
- Integrated Border Management System

== Priorities ==
- Counter-terrorism Wing (CTW)—Tasked to protect Pakistan from all kinds of terrorist attacks, including cyber, bioterrorism, chemical, electronic and nuclear terrorism (see counter-terrorism).
- Anti-Corruption Wing (ACW)—Tasked with undertaking investigations and combat all public corruption at all levels of command (see also NAB).
- Economic Crime Wing (ECW)—Mandate to protect Pakistan from economic terrorism and protection of intellectual property rights of the people. (see also: Economic terrorism).
- Immigration Wing (IW)—Combat human trafficking activities and resist illegal immigration in Pakistan.
- Technical Wing (TW)—Tasked to make efforts to protect Pakistan against foreign intelligence operations and espionage (see counterintelligence and counterproliferation) as well as using scientific assistance to resolve high-technology crimes.
- Legal Branch (LB)—Responsible to provide legal guidance in all administrative and operational matters as well as protect civil rights.
- National Central Bureau (NCB)—Tasked to combat transnational/national criminal organizations and enterprises (see organized crime) with assistance from Interpol and the US Federal Bureau of Investigation (FBI).
- Anti Trafficking Unit (ATU)—Tasked to combat major violent crimes, to ensure country-wide coverage of human trafficking, as well as to prevent and protect the victims of trafficking.

== History ==
=== Background ===
After the 1971 war with India, police reforms were carried out by Pakistan after adopting recommendations from the report submitted by bureaucrat G. Ahmad in Prime Minister Secretariat, on 7 March 1972. The Federal Investigation Agency (FIA) was created on 13 January 1975, after being codified in the Constitution with the passing of the FIA Act, 1974, by Pakistan's Legislature. Initially, its first roles were to build efforts against organized crimes, smuggling, human trafficking, immigration offences, and passport scandals.

When the FIA was created, it took cases on corruption at every level of the government. Although ostensibly a crime-investigation service, the FIA also did investigations of accused political opponents and critics of financial impropriety, from tax evasions to taking bribery while in office.

=== National security and efforts against terrorism ===
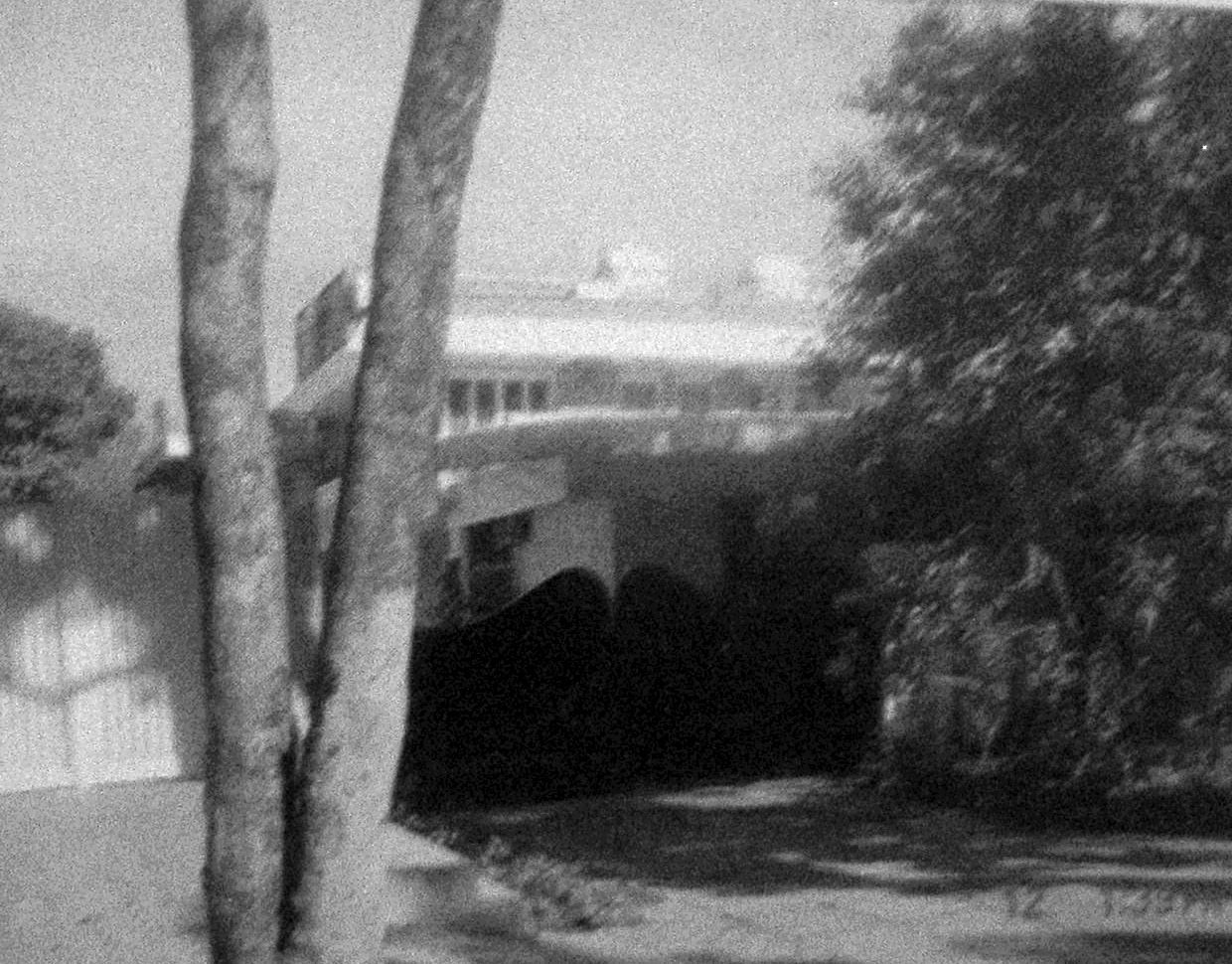
The compound where Ramzi Yousef was captured. The FIA worked in close co-ordination with the American Federal Bureau of Investigation (FBI) to capture Yousef in 1995.

Initially, its role was to conduct investigations on public corruption but the scope of the FIA's investigation was increased to take actions against communist terrorism in the 1980s. In 1981, the FIA agents successfully investigated and interrogated the culprits behind the hijacking of a Pakistan International Airlines Boeing 720 CR, immediately holding Murtaza Bhutto for its responsibility. The FIA keenly tracked the whereabouts of Murtaza Bhutto in Syria, and successfully limited the influence of his al-Zulfikar group. In 1985, the FIA's undercover operation busted the drug trade, with the illicit trade leaders and their culprits apprehended by the FIA. Known as the "Pakistan League Affair", the FIA effectively put an end to the illicit drug trade with the arrest of the gang's key drug lord.

From 1982 to 1988, the FIA launched a series of investigations and probes against Pakistan Communist Party leader Jam Saqi and aided the court proceedings relating to its findings. In 1986, the FIA successfully infiltrated the terrorist group responsible for hijacking Pan Am Flight 73, and quickly detained the Libyan commercial pilot suspected of having a role in the hijack.

After securing voting plurality in 1993 Pakistani general elections, Prime Minister Benazir Bhutto further widened the scope of FIA, making FIA akin to Inter-Services Intelligence (ISI) in the intelligence community. After approving the appointment of senior FIA agent Rehman Malik, the FIA's intelligence and investigations were now conducted at the international level, with close co-ordination with the American FBI. The FIA notably worked together with the FBI to conduct investigations of the 1993 bombing at the World Trade Center in New York, United States. The FIA and FBI tracked down the mastermind of that bombing, Ramzi Yousef, in Pakistan. In 1995, the successful investigation led to the extradition of Yousef to the United States.

In the 1990s, the FIA directed by Malik, was involved in leading investigations and actions against al-Qaeda operatives, Khalid Sheikh Mohammed and Ramzi Yousef, and assisted the FBI to apprehend Youssef in 1995, and Mohammed in 2002. The FIA pushed its efforts against terrorism and tracked crime syndicated organizations affiliated with the terrorist organizations. The FIA was said to be launching secret intelligence operations against the terrorist organizations, which mounted a secret competition with the ISI. Despite difficulties, the FIA had gained world prominence after reportedly leading successful operations against terrorism in 1996.

In 2001, the FIA successfully investigated the case against Sultan Mahmood for his alleged part in nuclear terrorism, though the FIA cleared Mahmood of his charges in 2002. In 2003, the role of counter-terrorism was assigned to the FIA, which led to an establishment of the Counter-Terrorism Wing (CTW). The CTW agents were provided extensive training and equipment handling by the FBI under the Anti Terrorism Assistance Program (ATTP).

The FIA began investigating Khalid Sheikh Mohammed and his movement around the world was monitored by the FIA. The FIA agents kept the investigations with FBI agents over the case of Mohammed. Eventually FIA's successful investigations led to Mohammed's capture in Rawalpindi, Punjab, in a paramilitary operation conducted jointly by the CIA and the ISI in 2003. In 2002, the FIA continued its investigation and had strict surveillance of the movements of Aafia Siddiqui in Karachi. In 2003, the FIA had been investigating the investigation on Siddiqui's movements and activities, subsequently sharing with the United States.

Between 2021 and 2026, the total count of most-wanted terrorists in FIA's Red Book surged by 35 per cent, growing from 1,330 to 1,804. However, India alleged that the list was merely an "eyewash to misdirect international scrutiny."

=== Anti-infringement efforts ===
Efforts on probes against copyright violation was increased after a petition was filed by the FBI which disputed Pakistan's commitment to rooting out infringement within its national borders in 2001.

In 2002, the FIA launched several probes against copyright infringement and Pakistan was en route to having its US duty-free GSP agreements being taken away from it in 2005. To avert any further negative fallout, sections of the Copyright Ordinance 1962 were included in the FIA's schedule of offences. This legislation paved the way in 2005, under the direction of the federal interior ministry, to raid the country's largest video wholesale centre: The Rainbow Centre.

Raiding the factories of the dealers that operated within the centre proved to be a highly successful enterprise, resulting in a reduction of 60% of sales of bootlegged video material. A spokesman from the International Federation of the Phonographic Industry (IFPI), later confirmed, that many of the outlets had stopped selling unlicensed video goods and were now selling mobile phones, highlighting that the FIA's raids and the resultant legal action were a success.

== Intelligence operations ==
In 1972–73, Prime Minister Zulfikar Ali Bhutto adopted many recommendations of the Hamoodur Rahman Commission's papers after seeing the intelligence failure in East Pakistan. This led the reformation of the FIA as Prime Minister Bhutto visioned the FIA as equivalent to American FBI which not only protects the country from internal crises but also from foreign suspected threats therefore he established the FIA on the same pattern. In 1970s, Prime Minister Bhutto had the Pakistan intelligence to actively run military intelligence programs in various countries to procure scientific expertise and technical papers in line of Alsos Mission of Manhattan Project.

Both the FIA and the Intelligence Bureau (IB) were empowered during the government and the scope of their operation was expanded during 1970s. Though ISI did lose its importance in the 1970s, the ISI regained its importance in the 1980s after successfully running the military intelligence program against the Soviet Union. Sensing the nature of competition, President Zia-ul-Haq consolidated the intelligence services after the ISI getting training from the CIA in 1980s, and subsequently improved its methods of intelligence.

In 1990s, the ISI and FIA, in many ways, were at war in the poverty-stricken landscape of Pakistan politics. The ISI used its Islamic guerrillas as deniable foot soldiers to strike at FIA credibility, and according to published accounts, the FIA turned to Israeli Mossad and Israeli Intelligence Community through Pervez Musharraf to helped down the terrorist networks in the country. Throughout the 1990s, the intelligence community remained under fire and competition in each services for credibility.

After the 11 September 2001, the attacks in the United States history, the FBI launched the largest investigation in its history and soon determined that the hijackers were linked to al-Qaeda, led by Saudi exiled Osama bin Laden. Same as just after 9/11 attacks in the United States, the FIA gained credibility over the ISI in the United States. The FIA and ISI were also mentioned in The Path to 9/11 television series.

=== Special FIA teams ===
On 9 June 1975, the FIA formed the Immigration Wing (IW) to help NARA agents and officials to conduct probes against illegal immigration to Pakistan. In 1979, the Anti-Human Smuggling Wing was formed to take evasive actions against the human smugglers and trafficking. In 1975, another special team, the Technical Wing, was formed to tackle financial crimes.

In 2003, the FIA formed an elite counter-terrorism unit to help deal with exterminating terrorism in the country. Named Counter-Terrorism Wing (CTW), it acts as an Elite team in related procedures and all counter-terrorism cases. Also the same year, the FIA formed the Cyber Investigation Unit (CIU) and the Computer Analysis and Forensic Laboratory.

Since then, the FIA has assigned its agents, and officials have received physical training and electronic equipment from the United States. In 2011, the CTW was further expanded and FIA established another Terrorist Financing Investigation Unit (TFIU) to conduct and lead operations against terrorism financing. The CTW operatives have also assisted other intelligence agencies to conduct joint investigations against the terror groups. To date CTW has always been an integral part of high-profile terrorist cases. It has also managed the most wanted list of individuals involved indirectly or directly in taking part in terrorism. In 2008, the FIA successfully led and concluded the joint investigations on the Marriott Hotel bombing in Islamabad. The FIA shared most of its findings gathered through interrogation of the arrested suspects to help hunt down the top members of al-Qaeda, with the FBI.

Other FIA special teams included the Anti-Corruption Wing (ACW) which was established in 2004 to lead probes against corrupt officials and other white collar criminals. In 2004, the Economic Crime Wing (ECW) was also established in 2004 but transferred to the NAB; though it was restored to the FIA in 2008. In 2014, the FIA formed an elite response team with the National Counter Terrorism Authority (NACTA) agency to take decisive and through counter-terrorism actions, based on gained internal intelligence, against the terror groups.

== International access ==
=== Cooperation with foreign counterparts ===
In 2006, the FIA resumed operational links with its Indian counterpart, the Central Bureau of Investigation, after a gap of 17 years.

The FIA participates in the PISCES project which was initiated by the US Department of State, Terrorist Interdiction Program (TIP) in 1997, as a system to improve their watch-listing capabilities by providing a mainframe computer system to facilitate immigration processing. The PISCES system has been installed at seven major airports of the country i.e. Islamabad, Karachi, Lahore, Peshawar, Quetta, Multan and Faisalabad airports. The system has provision to accommodate about information on suspects from all law enforcement agencies like Immigration, Police, Narcotics Control, Anti-smuggling, and Intelligence Services.

== Organization structure ==
The FIA is headed by the appointed Director-General who is appointed by the Prime Minister, and confirmed by the President. Appointment for the Director of FIA either comes from the high-ranking officials of police or the civil bureaucracy. The DG FIA reports to the Interior Secretary of Pakistan. The Director General of the FIA is assisted by three Additional Director-Generals and ten Directors for effective monitoring and smooth functioning of the operations spread all over the country. The organizational structure of the Federal Investigation Agency (FIA) is as follows:

Administrative offices and wings	Executive figure	Commands and the area of responsibility
Immigration Wing	Additional DG	Director of PISCES program Director of Immigration; Director of AHS; Dy. Director of ATU; Dy. Director of Law; Dy. Director of Legal Organization
Anti Corruption wing	Additional DG	Director of Technical Ops. Director of Law; Director of I&M; Director of IPR; Dy. Director of Crimes; Dy. Director of Technical Ops.
Administration Wing	Additional DG	Commandant of FIA Academy; Director of Administration; Director of Engineering; Director of Accountings
Counter Terrorism Wing	Director	Deputy commandant Operations; Deputy commandant Intelligence
Punjab-I	Director	
Punjab-II	Director	
Sindh-I	Director	
Sindh-II	Director	
Khyber-Pakhtunkhwa	Director	
Balochistan	Director	
Islamabad	Director	
National Central Bureau (Interpol)	Director	

The FIA is headquartered in Islamabad and also maintains a separate training FIA Academy, also in Islamabad which was opened in 1976. In 2002, FIA formed a specialised wing for investigating Information and Communication Technology (ICT) related crimes. This wing is commonly known as the National Response Centre for Cyber Crimes (NR3C) and has the credit of arresting 12 hackers, saving millions of dollars for the government exchequer. This wing of the FIA has state-of-the-art Digital Forensic Laboratories managed by highly qualified Forensic Experts and is specialised in Computer and Cell Phone Forensics, cyber/electronic crime investigation, Information System Audits and Research & Development. Officers of the NR3C carry out training for Officers of Police and other Law Enforcement Agencies of Pakistan. The Federal Investigation Agency (FIA) has its headquarters in Islamabad. The chief presiding officer of the agency is called the director general, and is appointed by the Ministry of Interior. The headquarters provide support to 7 provincial offices, i.e. Sindh-I, Sindh-II, Punjab-I, Punjab-II, KPK, Balochistan and Federal Capital Islamabad. The provincial heads of agency are called "directors". Further there are smaller offices known as wings or circles e.g. Crime, Corporate Crime, Banking Crime and Anti-Human Trafficking Circles at the provincial level. They are headed by additional and deputy directors, helped by investigation officers (I.O.) like assistant directors, inspectors, sub-inspectors and assistant sub-inspectors etc. for running of bureau business. The wings are major segments of the agency known as Anti-Corruption or Crime Wing, Cyber Crime Wing, Immigration Wing, Technical Wing, Legal Wing, Administration Wing and National Response Centre for Cyber Crimes (NR3C). Further there are branches working under the command of above-mentioned wings, viz. counter-terrorism branch (SIG), Interpol branch, legal branch, crime branch, economic crime branch, intellectual property rights branch, immigration branch, anti-human smuggling branch, PISCES branch, administration branch, implementation and monitoring branch.

Designations
Grade	Designation	Equivalent Police Ranks
BS-7	Constable	Constable
BS-9	Head Constable	Head Constable
BS-11	Assistant Sub-Inspector	Assistant Sub-Inspector
BS-14	Sub-Inspector	Sub-Inspector
BS-16	Inspector	Inspector
BS-17	Assistant Director	Assistant Superintendent of Police
BS-18	Deputy Director	Superintendent of Police
BS-19	Additional Director	Senior Superintendent of Police
BS-20	Director	Deputy Inspector General of Police
BS-21	Additional Director General	Additional Inspector General of Police
BS-22	Director-General	Inspector General of Police

== Criticisms and controversies ==
=== Covert operations on political groups ===
The FIA has used covert operations against domestic political groups since its inception; the FIA launched covert operations against the right-wing activists of the PNA. In 1990s, the FIA was involved in running active intelligence operation against the Bonded Labour Liberation Front (BLLF) on behest of the government. Critics of FIA have called the agency "secret police". In the 1980s, the FIA also targeted Pakistani leftist groups and was instrumental in conducting inquiries (Jam Saqi case) in preparation against the Communist Party of Pakistan.

=== 2005 FIA scandal ===
In 2005, Pakistani Ministry of Justice agents successfully infiltrated the immigration wing of the FIA, leading the FIA to launch an investigation against its own department. The special agents of the FIA arrested five of FIA's immigration agents for their alleged role in human trafficking, and most of them were dismissed from the service.

=== 2008 Lahore bombings ===
On 11 March 2008, the Pakistani Taliban (TTP) coordinated the twin suicide bombings to target the counter-terrorist unit of FIA based in Lahore. The building was severely damaged during the suicidal attack. The Geo News later reported that "the building also housed the offices of a special US-trained units of FBI created to counter terrorism" suggesting a motive.

== See also ==
- Law enforcement in Pakistan
- National cyber crime investigation agency corruption scandal
