= Feline Welfare Organization =

- ފީލައިން ވެލްފެއާރ އޯގަނައިޒޭޝަން
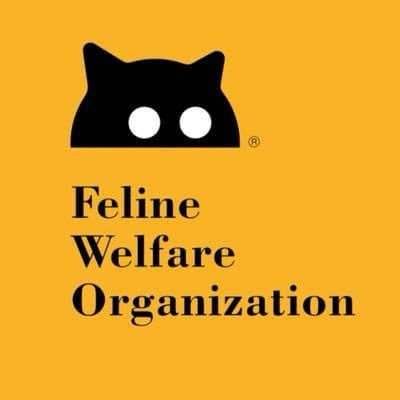
- Logo since 2023
- Abbreviation: FWO
- Formation: 22 August 2023; 3 years ago
- Founder: Ahmed Vision
- Type: Non-profit NGO
- Headquarters: Malé
- Location: Maldives
- Region served: Maldives
- Services: Trap–neuter–return (TNR), community street-feeding, medical care drives
- President: Ahmed Vision
- Vice President: Aminath Munawwara
- Secretary General: Shajaan Muaz Shaheem
- Website: felinewelfare.org

Feline Welfare Organization (Dhivehi: ފީލައިން ވެލްފެއާރ އޯގަނައިޒޭޝަން; FWO) is a non-governmental organization (NGO) based in the Maldives, that works on the welfare of stray and community cats. Operating primarily in the Malé region, it manages trap-neuter-return (TNR) programs, coordinates street feeding, and has conducted cat registration and medication drives.

The organization works with local island councils and the Ministry of Agriculture and Animal Welfare on cat shelters and sanctuaries initiatives. It also coordinates public campaigns focused on responsible pet ownership and reporting animal cruelty.

FWO advocated for stronger animal welfare legislation. The 20th People's Majlis passed the Maldives' first comprehensive Animal Welfare Bill on 19 November 2025. It was later ratified into law as Act No. 23/2025 by President Mohamed Muizzu on 3 December 2025.

== History ==
Feline Welfare Organization was established on 22 August 2023 in the Maldives. Local media and FWO have linked the increase in the cat population to minimal animal management infrastructure, low public awareness regarding pet ownership, and limited local veterinary resources.

The organization began regular street feeding programs that reached several hundred cats in Malé City and later extended similar efforts to a number of other islands. It promotes trap-neuter-return (TNR, also referred to by the group as CNR) for stray cat population management and has worked with the Malé City Council and the Ministry of Agriculture and Animal Welfare on initiatives related to cat shelters, including the Olhu Hiyaa facility in Hulhumalé.

== Leadership ==
The Feline Welfare Organization was founded by Ahmed Vision, who serves as the organization's president. The executive board comprises co-founders Aminath Munawwara as vice president, Ali Shifan as secretary, Shajaan Muaz Shaheem as secretary general, and Aishath Raya as treasurer. Amhar Mohamed provides legal counsel to the organization on a pro bono basis.

== Controversies ==
=== Response to animal cruelty incidents ===
A video depicting a man abusing a cat circulated on social media and generated public outcry. FWO reported the incident to the Maldives Police Service, the Food and Drug Authority (FDA), and the Immigration Department, requesting an investigation into the matter. Although there were initially claims that the man had been preparing food with cat meat, no evidence supporting the claims was found. The man was arrested but later released due to insufficient evidence for charges; he was subsequently deported for visa violations.

=== 2025 Olhu Hiyaa shelter disease outbreak ===
In September and October 2025, a disease outbreak occurred at the Olhu Hiyaa shelter in Hulhumalé, leading to conflicting accounts regarding the feline mortality rate. A joint report released by a coalition of four local animal welfare organizations stated that 51 cats died within a 20-day period due to spreading infections, including mycoplasma. Conversely, the Ministry of Agriculture and Animal Welfare issued a statement clarifying that the official death toll was 26 cats, attributing the fatalities to a viral outbreak.

The NGO coalition's report noted that the ministry had handed facility operations over to FWO prior to the outbreak, and flagged concerns regarding cross-contamination, sanitation, and shared enclosures. Public records indicated that the organizations involved in the inspection had previously submitted proposals to assume operational management of the shelter but were not selected. FWO publicly stated that its operational involvement at the facility was strictly limited in that duration and that it did not hold management responsibilities during the disease outbreak, later releasing visual and operational documentation to address the claims made in the joint report.

== Activities ==
=== Advocacy for stray cat management ===
FWO promotes trap-neuter-return (TNR) as a method to manage the stray cat population. Implementation remains limited by existing government policies.

=== Feeding programs ===
The organization regularly feeds between 350 and 400 cats in Malé City and has extended its feeding to six other local islands. These programs are supported by donations, local businesses, and volunteers.

=== Establishment of animal sanctuaries and shelters ===
FWO has supported the development of dedicated animal facilities, including a proposed animal park in Vaavu Thinadhoo. It also announced separate plans to develop a cat sanctuary featuring veterinary clinics, a cat café, and public educational spaces.

The Olhu Hiyaa shelter in Hulhumalé was inaugurated on 2 November 2024. The shelter was designed to hold up to 1,000 cats and includes veterinary clinics, quarantine areas, and sterilization facilities.

Initially managed by the Malé City Council, operational responsibility for the shelter was transferred to the Ministry of Agriculture and Animal Welfare in February 2025. Feline Welfare Organization (FWO) has collaborated with government authorities in relation to the shelter, including providing donations and assisting with management, during a period, when more than 127 cats were housed at the facility. It has also helped with capture of strays and bringing them to the facility.

=== Public awareness and education ===
FWO organizes medical treatment and registration days for stray cats, and also conducts educational presentations for local island councils to promote responsible pet ownership.

FWO has also launched public campaigns in Malé addressing reported cases of street cat abuse, including incidents involving chemical exposure and the tracking of missing street cats. In response to these events, the organization petitioned the Ministry of Agriculture and Animal Welfare and the Maldives Police Service to initiate official investigations and requested increased community surveillance to prevent animal cruelty.

=== Partnerships and collaborations ===
The organization has established formal agreements with local municipal bodies, including a partnership with the Rasdhoo Council to address stray cat populations on local islands. In the commercial sector, FWO collaborates with regional distributors such as COSMO by EXCO (Filaa Store) to secure logistics and dietary supplies for its community feeding drives.

=== Contribution to national animal welfare reforms ===
FWO also pushed for reforms related to animal cruelty and stray animal management following the cruelty incidents reported over the years. In December 2025, President Mohamed Muizzu ratified the Animal Welfare Act, which introduced regulations governing the breeding, transport, import and export, and care of animals, as well as penalties of up to MVR 1 million for offenses such as injury, abandonment, and the spread of disease.

== Challenges in stray cat management ==
Reports and government statements have described several ongoing difficulties in stray cat management in the Maldives. These include limited coordination between municipal authorities, the absence of a fully unified national policy before 2025, financial and capacity constraints at facilities such as Olhu Hiyaa, and continued low rates of pet sterilization and public awareness of responsible ownership. Enforcement of anti-cruelty measures was also described as limited prior to the 2025 Animal Welfare Act.
