= Trap–neuter–return =

Strategy for controlling feral animal populations

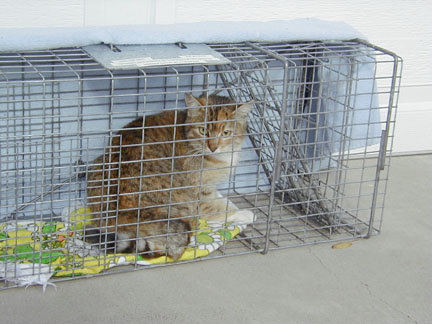
Cat caught in a live-trap for TNR

Trap–neuter–return (TNR), also known as trap–neuter–release, is a controversial method that attempts to manage populations of feral cats. The process involves live-trapping the cats, having them neutered, ear-tipped for identification, and, if possible, vaccinated, then releasing them back into the outdoors. If the location is deemed unsafe or otherwise inappropriate, the cats may be relocated to other appropriate areas (barn/farmyard homes are often considered best). Often, friendly adults and kittens young enough to be easily socialized are retained and placed for adoption. Feral cats cannot be socialized, shun most human interaction and do not fare well in confinement, so they are not retained. Cats suffering from severe medical problems such as terminal, contagious, or untreatable illnesses or injuries are often euthanized. Implementation of TNR is often also accompanied with the introduction of new laws that prevent land owners from removing feral cats from their properties, as well as protection from liability for people that feed and release feral cats.

In the past, the main goal of most TNR programs was the reduction or eventual elimination of free-roaming cat populations. It is still the most widely implemented non-lethal method of managing them. While that is still a primary goal of many efforts, other programs and initiatives may be aimed more towards providing a better quality of life for feral cats, stemming the population expansion that is a direct result of breeding, improving the communities in which these cats are found, reducing "kill" rates at shelters that accept captured free-roaming cats, in turn improving public perceptions and possibly reducing costs, and eliminating or reducing nuisance behaviors to decrease public complaints about free-roaming cats.

Scientific research has not found TNR to be an effective means of controlling the feral cat population. Literature reviews have found that when studies documented TNR colonies that declined in population, those declines were being driven primarily by substantial percentages of colony cats being permanently removed by a combination of rehoming and euthanasia on an ongoing basis, as well as by an unusually high rate of death and disappearance. TNR colonies often increase in population for a number of reasons: cats breed quickly, and the trapping and sterilization rates are frequently too low to stop this population growth; food is usually being provided to the cats; and public awareness of a TNR colony tends to encourage people in the surrounding community to dump their own unwanted pet cats there. The growing popularity of TNR, even near areas of particular ecological sensitivity, has been attributed in part to a lack of public interest regarding the environmental harm caused by feral cats, and the unwillingness of both scientific communities and TNR advocates to engage.

== Terminology ==
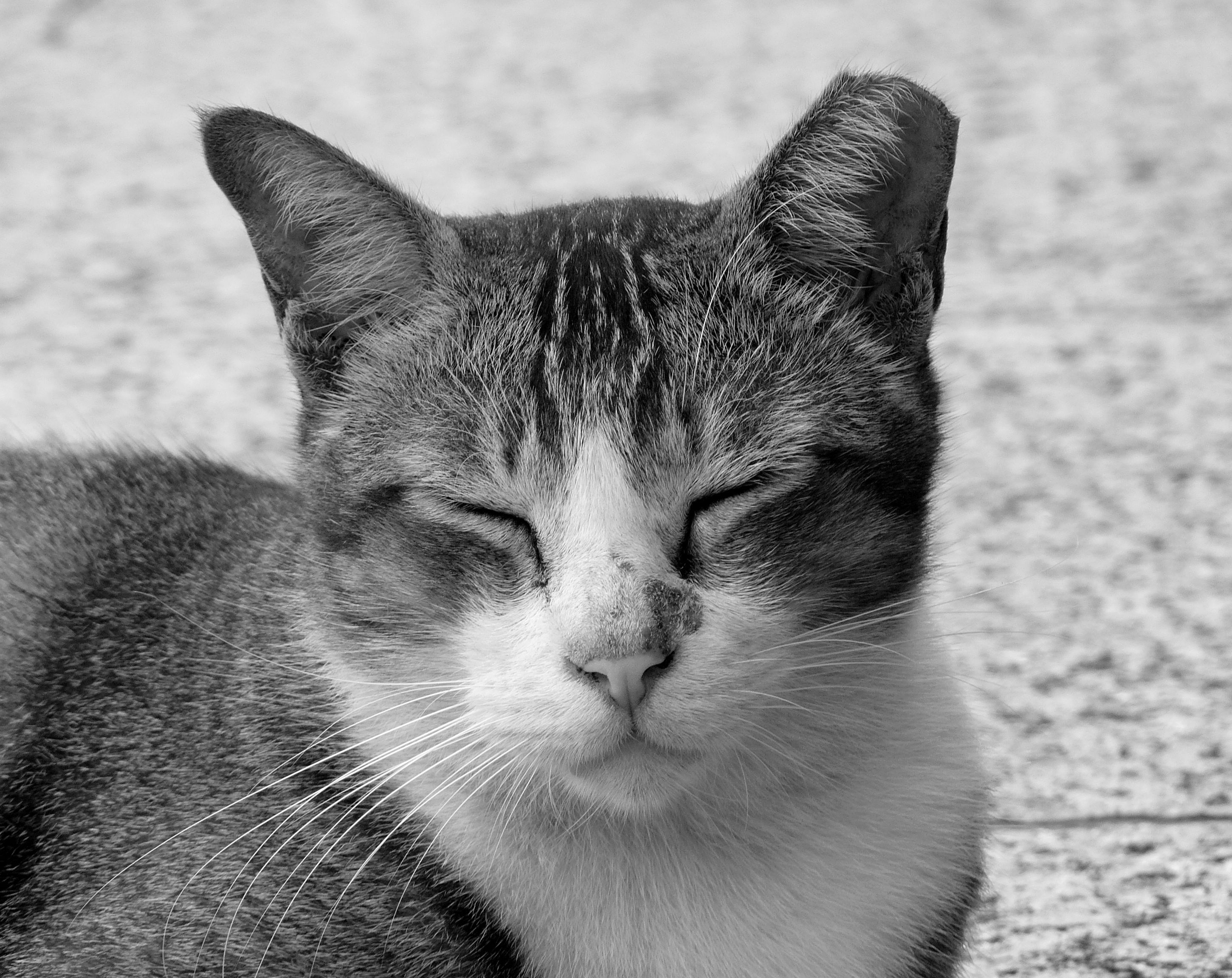
A cat displaying an ear tip, a common practice to identify cats that have been TNRed.

TNR usually stands for trap–neuter–return. It is sometimes described as trap–neuter–release. The word return emphasizes that most feral cats are returned to their original locations under such a program. Variant acronyms and terms include: TNSR (for 'trap–neuter/spay–return'), TNVR ('trap–neuter–vaccinate–return'), TNRM ('trap–neuter–release–maintain/manage') where 'maintain' generally means caregivers feed and monitor the feral cats after they are returned to their territories, and TTVAR ('trap–test–vaccinate–alter–release').

TVHR ('trap–vasectomize/hysterectomize–release') refers to a different method of cat population management, despite its similar name. TVHR differs in the type of sterilization surgery performed on the cats. Unlike traditional spays (ovariohysterectomy) and neuters (castration), which are done in TNR, the vasectomies and hysterectomies in TVHR result in sterile but sexually active cats.

RTF ('return to field') or TNS ('trap, neuter, shelter return') are alternative approaches that simply focus on the trap and desex portion and do not include a colony management aspect. In some instances, a receiving shelter will return a cat to where it was found; in other cases shelters are completely bypassed – a person takes a free-roaming live-trapped cat in for desexing, then returns it to where it was found.

== Advocacy and opposition ==
TNR as a method of managing free-roaming cat populations is controversial. Global attitudes towards these cats vary from those who see them as pets to those who target them as invasive species that need to be eliminated.

Organizations that oppose TNR include:

- The Australian Academy of Science: "reviews across many studies show that TNR is not effective: it does not minimise cat populations, it does not stop cats from killing wildlife, and it encourages people to dump unwanted cats."
- The National Wildlife Federation: "As a wildlife conservation organization, the National Wildlife Federation doesn’t support Trap, Neuter, Release/Return programs simply because they don’t work to minimize the negative impact of feral cats on wildlife populations. Feral cats are primarily responsible for the 1.3-4 billion birds and 6.3–22.3 billion mammals killed annually by domesticated cats in the United States and perpetuating feral cat colonies is incompatible with sound, science-based wildlife conservation."
- PETA does not endorse TNR, citing research finding it is not an effective intervention, along with data finding short life expectancies and inhumane living conditions for feral cats. They think that "You can’t be an animal advocate and support trap-neuter-release. It’s not about you. TNR makes humans, not cats—and certainly not wildlife—feel better, convincing themselves that they’re doing good. If you care about animals, you can’t logically support leaving cats outdoors to roam or dumping them on the streets through trap-neuter-release programs. Life on the streets is no life at all for cats—and for the wildlife they hurt and kill, it’s a death sentence."
- The Wildlife Society opposes TNR programs because it "undermines the work of wildlife professionals and severely jeopardizes the integrity of native biodiversity."
- American Bird Conservancy opposes TNR programs: "Unfortunately, TNR programs have been shown to fail to reduce feral cat populations while simultaneously maintaining feral cats on the landscape, where they contribute to wildlife and public health risks. [...] Scientific evidence regarding TNR clearly indicates that TNR programs are not an effective tool to reduce feral cat populations. Rather than slowly disappearing, studies have shown that feral cat colonies persist and may actually increase in size"
- In a review of TNR programs, RSPCA Australia concluded that "as a long term strategy, in most of Australia, TNR is difficult to recommend" [...] Since resources for cat control are limited, resources in and around towns and cities would be better spent on education, increased community awareness about responsible cat ownership, targeted desexing programs particularly for low-income earners, and better laws and regulations. For remote Australia [...] the most cost-effective and humane option is likely to be targeted and ongoing lethal control"
- The Canadian Veterinary Medical Association states that TNR "is ineffective at reducing cat population sizes over reasonable time frames (e.g., less 10 years), with removal strategies such as high-volume adoptions, relocations and euthanasia being more efficacious"
- The Australian Veterinary Association's policy on cat management in Australia does not support TNR: "these programs cannot be supported as a generalised and key strategy in the management of cats"
- The Canadian Wildlife Health Cooperative opposes TNR programs because they "do not appear to be a durable solution to the problems of abandoned cats which have a significant impact on biodiversity and the well-being of wildlife. Therefore, in a wildlife health perspective, the maintenance and nutritional support of these colonies are not recommended. We must also add that even with some external support, stray cats from these colonies are often in a suboptimal health, which also represents a welfare issue."
- The American Ornithologists' Union: "The American Ornithologists' Union strongly opposes programs to maintain feral cat colonies [and] urges local, state and federal wildlife agencies, public health organizations, and legislative bodies to ban and eliminate feral cats colonies through humane capture of feral cats"
- The American Society of Mammalogists: "We specifically oppose the creation or continuance of Trap, Treat, Vaccinate, Alter, and Release (TTVAR), Trap, Neuter, and Release (TNR), or related programs that manage feral or free-ranging cat populations."
- The Association of Avians Veterinarians "Supports reducing the numbers of stray cats through humane capture (with placement in homes where appropriate) by local health departments, humane societies, and animal control officers [and] supports actions by governmental wildlife agencies, public health agencies, and public and private organizations to ban or eliminate cat colonies on public lands in a humane manner and discourage feral cat colonies on private lands."
- The International Wildlife Rehabilitation Council: "The IWRC supports the humane removal of feral cat and dog populations, including feral cat colonies, through the rehabilitation and adoption of suitable animals into domestic environments and humane euthanasia of animals that cannot be rehabilitated and rehomed."
- The National Environmental Science Program Threatened Species Recovery Hub (TSRH): "The evidence from numerous trials carried out in a range of countries show that TNR does not reduce the overall population size of urban ferals (owned, stray) cats because of continual immigration from outside the colony. Desexed cats that are returned to the area where they were caught continue to hunt, so their impacts on wildlife are unabated."
- The Centre for Invasive Species Solutions: "There is extensive evidence that these TNR programs are not capable of effectively reducing feral cat or stray cat populations even at a very small or localised scale."
- The australian Department of Climate Change, Energy, the Environment and Water has the objective to "Continue to discourage TNR" in its Threat abatement plan for predation by feral cats (2024) because "trap-neuter-release (TNR) programs do not stop individual cats from hunting wildlife or spreading disease, nor do they improve the welfare of released cats, and may not lead to overall reduction in the cat population or impacts. In general, TNR is therefore not recommended."
- The Australian Wildlife Society: "Free-roaming cats are regarded as one of the biggest threats to biodiversity and therefore the Trap Neuter Release approach should be considered an unacceptable practice. Trap Neuter Release schemes are illegal in Victoria under the Domestic Animals Act 1994 and should be considered illegal throughout the rest of the country."

Organizations that support TNR include:

- The American Society for the Prevention of Cruelty to Animals endorses TNR "as the only proven humane and effective method to manage community cat colonies." It clarifies its position by stating that managing "involves a colony caretaker who provides food and adequate shelter and monitors the cats' health."
- Humane World for Animals recommends TNR as one of a number of programs which can reduce cat populations. It views TNR as the best way to mitigate cat-wildlife conflict, and opposes removing feral cats from the outdoors, saying that other cats will only appear to replace them.
- The American Humane Association supports TNR programs for cats which can be released into safe cat colonies, where socialized cats are rehomed.
- The Royal Society for the Prevention of Cruelty to Animals "supports Trap, Neuter and Release (TNR) programmes with veterinary support. Healthy cats should be neutered, ear-tipped and returned or, where appropriate, re-sited."

== Advantages and disadvantages ==
Various studies and arguments have been presented both in support of and in opposition to free-roaming cats and TNR.

=== Purported reductions in population over time ===
The high quality and visibility of the program, which provided food and veterinary care, may have encouraged abandonment of cats if owners believed that the cats would be well taken care of after abandonment. Abandonment may also have occurred if owners believed that cats would be better off under the care of the program rather than surrendered to a shelter where they would face the risk of euthanasia.

— From Decrease in Population and Increase in Welfare of Community Cats in a Twenty-Three Year Trap-Neuter-Return Program in Key Largo, FL: The ORCAT Program

In general, trap-neuter-release programs are not effective at reducing the population of feral cats, because the rates of trapping necessary to stop population growth are usually unattainable in real world conditions.

Some long-term studies have claimed or been cited to show that TNR is effective in stopping reproduction and reducing the population over time, but the methodology, analysis and conclusions of some of these studies have been called into question. Reviews of these studies, as well as mathematical models of population growth, have shown that TNR colonies only decrease in population where cats experience very high rates of permanent removal (of at least 50% of the colony cats per year, such as by a combination of adoption and euthanasia), combined with high sterilization rates, and low rates of immigration of new cats into the colony. Unless all of these conditions are met, TNR colonies will not decrease in size over time.

- An eleven-year study of a TNR program at the University of Central Florida achieved a population decrease of 66%, from 68 cats in 1996 (when the census was first completed after some trapping) to 23 cats in 2002. No new kittens were born after 1995, and newly arrived stray or abandoned cats were neutered or adopted to homes. However, as many proponents fail to note, TNR was not the sole reason for success. The population reduction was primarily from adoption (47%) and euthanasia (11%), or due to the cats no longer living on site with their whereabouts unknown (15%).
- A TNR program begun in 1992 by the Merrimack River Feline Rescue Society (MRFRS) on the central waterfront of Newburyport, Massachusetts, has been widely cited as an example of TNR success on a community level; however, only superficial reports about what took place have been available and there is very little statistical data to support the claims.

Other studies have shown some intensive TNR programs to be failures. In San Diego County, California, a TNR program that processed 14,452 cats over eleven years, and in Alachua County, Florida, a TNR program that processed 11,822 cats over six years, led to no reduced proportion of pregnant females and did not stop population growth.

The success of specific focused studies to advocate TNR as a solution for controlling and reducing free-roaming cat populations worldwide is problematic. More broad-based approaches include using matrix population models to estimate the efficacy of euthanasia versus trap-neuter-return for management of free-roaming cats, such as the one researchers established for use in urban environments.

Efforts to assess the effectiveness have been hampered by the lack of sufficient monitoring data. Having some professional assistance, adapting the population monitoring framework developed over decades by wildlife biologists, and systematic monitoring can evolve into a relatively low-cost, high-value adjunct to ongoing management efforts.

The public awareness of TNR colonies encourages people to dump their unwanted pet cats there. In one study, to explain the ingression of cats it was found that "the high quality and visibility of the program [...] may have encouraged abandonment of cats if owners believed that the cats would be well taken care of after abandonment. Abandonment may also have occurred if owners believed that cats would be better off under the care of the program rather than surrendered to a shelter where they would face the risk of euthanasia." Some of the cats that came in to the TNR colony had already been sterilized; some of these had ear-tips and some did not.

Introgression, particularly of intact cats, has been noted to be a barrier to decreasing cat populations over time through TNR efforts. It has become apparent that while the TNR process can reduce or limit the growth rate of the colony through reproduction, it may not reduce the population numbers if it is the sole method of intervention. Population reduction occurs primarily through adoptions of non-feral cats, natural death or euthanasia of sick animals, and disappearance or emigration of cats. TNR works together with these factors to reduce reproduction and thus to minimize replacement of animals lost from the colony. Other factors such as immigration of cats from surrounding areas can counteract its effect. Thus, the impact of TNR interventions on unowned cat populations can be complex, and ongoing management of colonies becomes an important component in optimizing reductions in the cat population.

=== Euthanasia debate ===
TNR advocates and opponents have different views on what constitutes a successful TNR program. Advocates use broad definitions of success, other than reductions in cat populations, such as claims of lower euthanasia rates, healthier feral cats, and cost savings for animal shelters. Wildlife conservationists and others who oppose TNR say that the only grounds for claiming a TNR program successful would be provable reduction and elimination of the feral cat population.

==== Reducing euthanasia numbers ====
- When the number of animals coming into a shelter exceeds its ability to care for, hold, or find foster placements, the facility may end up euthanizing animals. This could include even adoptable kittens or cats simply because they cannot be taken care of. A common outcome for a cat judged to be "feral" after being taken to a traditional shelter not practicing no-kill sheltering is euthanasia (humanely putting the animal to death). Feral cats do not tolerate being caged or handled and many shelters are unable to manage them without putting the animal or the staff at risk. TNR could alleviate this.

==== Cost savings ====
- In a 10-year study in Orange County, Florida, after a feral cat sterilization program was instituted in which 7,903 feral cats neutered, the cost was an estimated $442,568, as compared to $1,098,517 if they had been impounded and euthanized.
- In Port Orange, Florida, a TNR program started in 2013 in the city's business areas resulted in fewer stray cats and money saved. In the first year, 214 cats were sterilized for $13,000, which was much less than over $50,000 spent in 2010, when most of the impounded cats were euthanized. A theoretical savings of $123,000 was projected based on not having to impound the offspring that the cats may have produced if not spayed.
- A paper that compared models of TNR and trap-euthanize programs found that TNR would be about twice as expensive as euthanasia, even though TNR relied on volunteers. The models also showed that TNR only worked for populations of cats less than 1000, and that in model runs with 10% annual recruitment rates, the TNR populations never reached zero. In both TNR and trap-euthanize models, the most critical factor for controlling the cat population was to prevent people from abandoning more cats.
- A study showed that removal-based methods were costlier than sterilization-based approaches, with most of the cost being due to having to hold the cats in the shelter for a mandatory time period before euthanasia. The most expensive option was finding homes for the cats, because those cats were held in the shelter the longest. The data highlighted that while average costs were similar, the 25% removal scenario showed significantly higher cost variability (US$11,370–US$44,435) compared to sterilization (US$6200–US$13,470). Sterilization proved to be more economical and cost-effective, with volunteer labor further increasing its efficiency. The costs of feeding and care for TNR cats after release were not included in the study, because "they are not directly related to population control."

==== Public opinion ====
- In 2019, a study was published that concluded "for most Brisbane City (Australia) residents, when awareness is raised about the problem of urban stray cats and management strategies, the majority are supportive of a TNR community program with little or no persuasion required."
- TNR programs may have a side effect of reducing the stress and strain volunteers and staff have related to euthanasia in shelters. A 2019 study concluded that euthanasia-related strain is prevalent among shelter employees. Such strain is associated with increased levels of general job stress, work-to-family conflict, somatic complaints, and substance use, and with lower levels of job satisfaction.

TNR opponents say that public support of TNR may be exaggerated by its advocates, who present it as the only acceptable method for managing feral cats. They cite a 2014 study in Hawaii that found that 87% of respondents wanted there to be fewer cats in the outdoors, a result that Lepczyk et al. wrote, "TNR programs rarely achieve, evaluate, or even consider as part of their mission." The study also found public support was in favor of lethal methods that were humane, with TNR being the least popular option.

A study of global media coverage of the problems associated with outdoor cats found that most coverage by popular media is biased in favor of TNR. Gow et al. wrote: "Most of the people interviewed in the popular press were from non-governmental organizations, mainly from cat welfare or cat rights groups (which are often focused on only one side of the issue). Researchers, shelter organizations, veterinarians, and groups that have different opinions than cat rights or welfare organizations on how to resolve issues surrounding free-roaming cats were rarely interviewed by the popular press. Most articles focused on cat welfare issues and the management strategies of euthanasia or trap–neuter–release (TNR), whereas less than one-third of the articles acknowledged that cats have any impact on wildlife or the broader environment." The study also found that cat management options that might be less controversial than TNR and euthanasia, such as cat sanctuaries, pet owner education, and subsidized spay-neuter programs for pet cats, were not covered.

=== Improving the cats' health and welfare ===
It has been claimed that TNR programs improve the welfare of free-roaming cats in many ways:

- Spayed female cats will no longer be burdened by pregnancy or nursing litters: Females have been found to be pregnant throughout the year. A study of the reproductive capacity of free-roaming cats showed they may have an average of 1.4 litters a year, with a median of 3 kittens/litter.
- Alleviating unnecessary suffering of kittens: 75% of the kittens born to free-roaming cats being studied died or disappeared before 6 months of age. Trauma was found to be the most common cause of death.
- Improved overall heath: The American Veterinary Medical Association (AVMA) notes that properly managed programs can improve quality of life through better nutrition, vaccination to prevent disease, and euthanasia of sick and debilitated cats.
- Fighting may decline, thus reducing injuries: A study between four colonies, two of neutered males and two of intact males, found that the frequency of agonistic behavior was lower in the neutered groups. The agonistic behavior that was noted in the neutered groups was attributable to interactions involving intact males who had moved into them. As noted above, introgression of cats is a common factor noted in studies.

Not all free-roaming cats, or cats that end up in live traps, are feral. Some are owned, but have been allowed to roam outdoors; some have escaped their homes or owners and are strays; some may have been abandoned or "dumped." The assessment, after trapping, of "social" (friendly and adoptable), "social but timid or scared" (may adjust and be adoptable), "not social" (not feral, prefers to not be handled, hard to adopt out) or "feral" is crucial if TNR is intended to be in the best interest of the animal. When programs provide for feral kittens to be socialized and adopted, and for friendly cats to be adopted, the welfare of those cats is improved.

Managed TNR programs that involve continuous active intervention on detection along with treatment and prevention of some of the more common diseases and parasites may help improve their overall health.

In 2016, investigative reporting by WFLA found that in Hillsborough County, Florida, TNR cats were being returned to the outdoors the day after their surgical sterilizations, because the Tampa Bay Humane Society did not have "a place to put them for a couple of days" where they could be observed in recuperation. WFLA said they had possession of images of TNR cats bleeding from opened surgical wounds, images of TNR cat with maggots in their incisions, and an image of a bloodied cat trap whose occupant had bled out. Officials overseeing that TNR program said that their greatly reduced shelter euthanasia rates were worth it even if their TNR outcomes "weren't perfect".

=== Fewer complaints ===
TNR may help reduce public complaints pertaining to free-roaming cats. Female cats will 'call' (come into season and be receptive to the male cat) regularly, about every three weeks during sexually active times of the year if they do not get pregnant. Having un-spayed female cats in an area will attract un-neutered males with the attendant problems of spraying, fighting and caterwauling.

- After starting a TNR program in 1995, animal control in Orange County, Florida, received fewer complaints about cats, even after broadening the definition of a nuisance complaint.
- A study of a TNR program at Texas A&M University in 1998–2000 reported that the number of cat complaints received by the university's pest control service decreased from year 1 to year 2.

=== Effects on wildlife from hunting ===
Free-roaming domestic cats are considered an invasive species around the world. Numerous studies have shown that free-roaming cats can have a significant negative impact on native wildlife through their predation. They cause considerable wildlife destruction and ecosystem disruption, including the deaths of hundreds of millions of birds, small mammals, reptiles, amphibians, and fish. They have been linked to the extinction of 63 species and pose a threat to 360 more. Cats are now thought to be the single largest cause of anthropogenic bird mortality in North America.

Predation by cats contributes to declines in wildlife populations that are already affected by habitat loss and fragmentation. Feral cats that are being fed as part of a TNR program are subsidized predators, which means that their population is not limited by the availability of prey species, as would be the case in a natural ecology. Feeding the cats results in larger population densities; although feeding does not reduce their tendency to hunt prey, it does tend to concentrate predation in disturbed areas that are already fragmented by human activity. Feral cats typically occur at population densities from ten to one hundred times higher than those of naturally occurring predators in their size range, and in TNR colonies that are fed the cat populations will not decrease no matter how much the populations of prey species may by reduced by them, a state similar to the phenomenon of hyperpredation that has been observed on some ocean islands.

Studies in California found significant declines in bird populations near TNR colonies where cats were being fed, as compared to normal bird populations at control sites, along with large decreases in native rodent populations, coupled with increases in the invasive house mouse population.

TNR cats are also eaten by wildlife. A California study of coyote stomach contents found that 35% contained domestic cat DNA, and that those coyotes that had eaten cats were taken from high density residential and industrial areas that were also the same types of development where TNR colonies were commonly located. The study suggested that TNR be banned as a potential driver of human-coyote conflict.

Wildlife advocates have questioned the underlying ethics of TNR, perceiving an inconsistency in the way that TNR advocates care about the claimed well-being of individual cats while they appear to ignore the harm and suffering that the cats cause to wildlife. Longcore et al. wrote that, "We argue that it is philosophically inappropriate for population-level impacts to be the only criteria by which the effects of cats are judged. People who notice and care about birds are just as attuned to the loss of an individual bird in a backyard, or the decline of local populations of birds, as are feral cat advocates to the loss of individual feral cats. We see no justification for valuing birds and other wildlife only as populations while valuing cats as individuals." Veterinary researcher David A. Jessup wrote, "Wild animals are not only killed by cats but are also maimed, mauled, dismembered, ripped apart, and gutted while still alive, and if they survive the encounter, they often die of sepsis because of the virulent nature of the oral flora of cats....Wild animals experience pain and suffer too. On the basis of compassion alone....the suffering of wildlife must be weighed against the perceived welfare of feral cats."

=== Risks to human and animal health ===
Stray animals in general may have significant impacts on public health due to factors such as a lack of preventive measures (e.g. vaccines, deworming), easy access to intermediate hosts (e.g. rats and birds), and unrestricted entry to public areas such as parks and playgrounds. Their presence is a major risk for the transmission of zoonotic diseases.

Free-roaming cats can act as vectors for diseases that can impact humans as well as other animals, domestic and wild. Transmissions can occur within the species and to other species. Feline leukemia virus, feline immunodeficiency virus, ectoparasites (fleas, mites, lice, ticks), intestinal and protozoan parasites, Rickettsia, and Coxiella ("Q Fever") are examples of inter and intra-species shared diseases and parasites.

There are numerous zoonotic pathogens shed in feline feces, such as Campylobacter and Salmonella spp; ascarids (e.g., Toxocara cati); hookworms (Ancylostoma spp); and the protozoan parasites Cryptosporidium spp, Giardia spp, and T. gondii. Contaminated soil is an important source of infection for humans, herbivores, rodents, and birds and several studies suggest that pet feces contribute to bacterial loading of streams and coastal waters.

Free-roaming cat populations have been identified as a source for several zoonotic diseases that can and have affected humans, including:

- Rabies. Not all TNR programs consider rabies vaccination necessary; bat and skunk rabies are found in wildlife in California, but TNR programs released 90,000 cats there without vaccinating them for rabies. Even when TNR cats receive their initial rabies vaccination, most do not receive their recommended boosters because typical TNR programs trap less than 10% of the cats per year, a level too low to achieve herd immunity, because most do not keep formal records, and because most TNR cats are only trapped once in their lifetimes. Additionally, TNR feeding stations are a food source that attracts skunks, foxes, and raccoons, the North American species that most commonly transmit rabies. Children are more likely to play with TNR cats than with wild animals, and may be less likely to recognize the need for post-exposure prophylaxis after being exposed to rabies.
- Toxoplasmosis
- Various nematode parasites including intestinal worms
- Plague
- Tularemia
- Typhus
- Bacterial diseases such as cat-scratch fever (Bartonella)
- Avian Influenza A/H5N1 virus
- Fungal diseases, including sporotrichosis

== TNR of other animals ==
=== Dogs ===
Domestic dogs (Canis familiaris) that run free are an invasive species that depredates wildlife, causes property damage, and spreads disease. Most countries control feral dogs through culling and euthanasia, with more developed countries also using animal shelters, pet licensing, and adoption. But some countries, including India, Taiwan, as well as some of the municipalities of Argentina, have banned lethal methods in favor of "no-kill" policies, resulting in large increases in the stray dog population, decreased welfare of dogs, and overcrowded animal shelters. In Taiwan, this left TNR as the only option for dog population control. According to a study by Ho et al., the program was hampered by the ongoing immigration of 50-100 new dogs into the area each year, as well as an inability to remove them. It was also found that TNR dogs continued to attack wildlife at high enough intensity that TNR is not a desirable intervention for dog population control in ecologically sensitive areas.

=== Horses ===
In the United States, the Bureau of Land Management administers contraceptives to wild horses. Feral horses and burros are domesticated species that have few predators in the United States, and a rapid rate of population growth. There is no political consensus as to whether they should be treated like "wildlife, livestock, or pets". Wildlife can be legally hunted, livestock can be legally slaughtered, but the only management option for feral equids is for them to be adopted by members of the public, or for them to be removed to private facilities where the federal government pays contractors to maintain them for life, and for them to be administered contraceptives to slow their population growth. The fertility control method is limited because the animals are widely scattered in rugged and remote places where it is inefficient to medicate them in large numbers. This state of affairs has been called "unsustainable" and "a painful resource sink" by Hennig et al.

== Treatment by country ==
Domestic cats can be found on every continent except Antarctica. Of the 700 million cats in the world, 480 million of them are feral. Control of free-roaming dogs and cats is a worldwide problem. Beyond pragmatic and scientific considerations, cultural heritage, ethical beliefs, and social and economic impacts play critical roles in efforts to address it.

The legal status of free-roaming and stray cats varies from location to location, as do the histories and efforts of TNR programs. There are numerous governments supporting trap–neuter–return.

=== Australia ===
As of 2022, the only place in Australia where TNR is legal is in the Australian Capital Territory, as Australian laws make the release of invasive species illegal in the rest of the country. TNR programs are active in feral cat communities across Canberra. In 2021, the Parliament of Australia issued a report that rejected TNR as an effective means of controlling feral cat populations; however, Australian animal welfare groups generally support it.

=== Canada ===
Across Canada, municipalities have replaced old animal control bylaws with "responsible pet ownership" rules intended to direct the obligations of pet behavior to their owners. A common feature of the accelerating trend is a requirement that owners get a license for their cats and ensure they do not roam.

In January 2012, a bylaw officer in Merritt, British Columbia, removed cat food and asked the Royal Canadian Mounted Police to consider criminal charges against those feeding the stray cats. No charges were laid, but the rescue group's business license was revoked and it was forced to move from its storefront location.

The City of Toronto, Ontario, includes TNR in its animal services and has a bylaw specifically addressing TNR and managed colonies. The Toronto Animal Services offers spay and neuter for colonies that are registered and have an assigned trained caretaker.

=== Denmark ===
TNR was practiced in Denmark in the mid-1970s, as reported at the 1980 Universities Federation for Animal Welfare (UFAW) symposium in London. Denmark's Society for the Protection of Cats practiced both tattooing and tipping the ear of the neutered cats to identify them.

=== France ===
In 1978, the city of Paris issued a Declaration of Rights of the Free-living Cat. In that year, Cambazard founded École du Chat and TNR'd its first cat, continuing to help thousands of cats in the following years.

=== Iceland ===
As of February 2020, TNR is legal in Iceland.

=== Israel ===
Like Turkey, Israel struggles with a continually increasing population of stray cats. Cats exist in every location with people, from the southernmost city of Eilat to communities in the Golan Heights. Moreover, it is illegal in Israel to remove cats from the streets as a result of pressure from Let the Animals Live. Due to large amounts of food left by people feeding them, colonies of cats are continuing to increase, with estimates putting the population within the city of Jerusalem at 2,000 cats per square kilometer. Efforts to trap, neuter, return the cats within Israel are not working, as the population is too large to feasibly catch enough cats to make a difference. Moreover, there is no national agreement on what to do regarding the cat population. As a result their population is increasing with no future plan of action. In January 2019, from a push by people who feed the cats, Jerusalem planned to instill "feeding stations" throughout the city. The goal was to facilitate specific areas for feeding to help the populations of stray cats and to improve their welfare. This plan was criticized by ecologists and conservationists, stating that it does nothing to help the welfare of the cats, with Amir Balaban of the Society for the Protection of Nature stating that "If someone cares about animals, they should take them home."

=== Italy ===
Killing feral cats has been illegal in the Lazio Region, which includes Rome, since 1988. A study in 2006 found almost 8,000 were neutered and reintroduced to their original colony from 1991 to 2000. It concluded that spay/neuter campaigns brought about a general decrease in cat numbers among registered colonies and censused cats, but the percentage of cat immigration (due to abandonment and spontaneous arrival) was around 21 percent. It suggested that TNR efforts without an effective education of people to control the reproduction of house cats (as a prevention for abandonment) are a waste of money, time and energy.

Since August 1991, feral cats have been protected throughout Italy when a no-kill policy was introduced for both cats and dogs. Feral cats have the right to live free and cannot be permanently removed from their colony; cat caretakers can be formally registered; and TNR methods are outlined in the national law on the management of pets.

Nine regions in Italy have made TNR programmes for dogs mandatory by law. Dogs are neutered, vaccinated and returned to their original area where they are monitored by the community.

=== Maldives ===
In the Maldives, trap–neuter–return (TNR) programs are primarily implemented by non-governmental organizations to manage the stray cat population humanely. The Feline Welfare Organization, established in 2023, promotes and carries out TNR initiatives in Malé and other islands, alongside feeding and care for hundreds of stray cats. While TNR is recognized as an effective non-lethal method, its widespread adoption has been limited by government policies, with efforts largely driven by NGO advocacy. The Animal Husbandry and Animal Welfare Act, ratified in December 2025, provides broader protections against animal cruelty but does not specifically mandate or regulate TNR programs.

=== Netherlands ===
In the Netherlands, maintaining ecological impact is still a work in progress. Another variation of the TNR method, Trap-Neuter-Relocate-Care, is being put in place on the island of Schiermonnikoog in attempts to control the cat population. Using camera traps, researchers estimated around 50 adult feral cats and identified "cat-hotspots." Live traps have removed 53 cats, but at least 20 remain. Challenges include high reproduction rates and roaming pet cats from nearby villages.

=== New Zealand ===
The Department of Conservation (DOC) is legislatively mandated to control feral cats on public conservation land. It has eradicated feral cats from several offshore islands. Control techniques include poisoning, trapping and shooting. Lethal controls follow efficient and humane best-practice techniques and adhere to the Animal Welfare Act 1999.

The Department of Conservation does not support TNR: "We don't support the 'trap, desex, release' approach to managing stray cats. This is because cats are predatory animals that continue to pose a threat to wildlife."

=== Peru ===
Peru is an active participant in La Red de Políticas Públicas through its "Programa de Equilibrio Poblacional" (PEP), a Latin American network that’s worked for over 25 years to humanely curb free-roaming dog and cat populations via mass, free, early (before six months) castration aiming to sterilize at least 20% of estimated animals each year. Focusing on feral-cat colonies, municipalities lend humane trap-cages to residents for capture, then provide free neutering at public clinics before returning cats to their original sites. In 2021, Law N°31311 formally prioritized dog and cat sterilization as a national public-health policy, mandating local governments to TNR community animals under Supreme Decree N°024-2023-SA. Districts like Los Olivos conduct regular TNR campaigns that have measurably reduced street-born cohorts. Los Olivos is currently one of the leading districts performing TNR as they have opened “Patitas Olivenses”, a municipal veterinary clinic, offering free, socially accessible TNR services for community cats. Early reports from Lima-based NGOs like Adoptamiu show that over 280 feral cats were sterilized in their first year of outreach, coinciding with anecdotal declines in kitten sightings within treated colonies.

=== Spain ===
In 2023, Spain passed a new law mandating the use of TNR and preventing removal of cats from the environment; largely without the support of Spanish conservationists, who called for the cats to be humanely removed instead.

=== United Kingdom ===
The earliest documented practice of trap–neuter–return was in the 1950s, led by animal activist Ruth Plant in the UK. In the mid-1960s, former model Celia Hammond gained publicity for her TNR work "at a time when euthanasia of feral cats was considered the only option". Hammond "fought many battles with local authorities, hospitals, environmental health departments" but stated that she succeeded over the years in showing that control "could be achieved by neutering and not killing".

The first scientific conference on "the ecology and control of feral cats" was held in London in 1980 and its proceedings published by the Universities Federation for Animal Welfare (UFAW). Subsequent UFAW publications in 1982, 1990, and 1995 were the primary scientific references for feral-cat control for many years.

=== United States ===
There is no federal law in the US that explicitly sets policy on feral cats, and state and local laws vary in their approaches. The Endangered Species Act and the Migratory Bird Treaty Act may be relevant to the legality of TNR. In a federal case, American Bird Conservancy v. Harvey (2014), conservationists sued Rose Harvey, the Commissioner of New York State Parks, under the Endangered Species Act for failing to prohibit activities supporting feral cats in a state park where the Piping Plover, a threatened species, was known to nest. Under a settlement and judicial order, the State of New York agreed to remove all of the cats to a shelter, and to trap and permanently remove any cats found in the park in the future.

There are legal theories that TNR programs may have liability under the Migratory Bird Treaty Act of 1918, a strict liability statute that states that "it shall be unlawful at any time, by any means or in any manner, to pursue, hunt, take, capture, kill, attempt to take, capture, or kill [...] any migratory bird, any part, nest, or egg of any such bird," including unintentional taking, except if otherwise regulated or permitted by the government, and provides for criminal penalties of up to $15,000 in fines and up to six months of incarceration for each bird unlawfully taken. (An example of a successful prosecution under the MBTA was United States v. Moon Lake Electric Association Incorporated; in that case a power company was found guilty and sentenced to fines and probation because birds were being electrocuted on power poles that it owned.) Because TNR colonies are supported by people, it is possible that predation of birds by TNR cats might be ruled an illegal intentional take by the courts.

On January 29, 2019, the Hawaii Invasive Species Council adopted a resolution supporting the keeping of pet cats indoors and the use of peer-reviewed science in pursuing humane mitigation of the impacts of feral cats on wildlife and people.

TNR of cats is illegal in Alaska, owing to a law against the release of cats into the wild, even if they were originally captured there. This has left trap-and-kill the only legal method of controlling the feral cat population there; however, the law against TNR is not well enforced and there are proposals to exempt sterilized cats from the rules.

Governments have been sued to try to block their TNR efforts. In December 2010, an injunction was granted to prevent a planned TNR program of the City of Los Angeles until an environmental review was completed under the California Environmental Quality Act. The judge did not rule on any environmental issues, or prohibit other organizations from doing TNR in the city.

In December 2024, a California court ruled that San Diego Humane Society's alleged release of friendly stray cats to the outdoors was unlawful animal abandonment. San Diego Humane Society was expected to appeal. Also in Southern California, Orange County Animal Care ended its TNR program in 2020 following a threat of legal action under California Penal Code Section 597, which prohibits abandonment of animals.

== See also ==
- Overpopulation in domestic animals
- Spaying and neutering
- Sterile insect technique
- Wildlife contraceptive
