= Global Organization of Parliamentarians Against Corruption =

International organization

Global Organization of Parliamentarians Against Corruption المنظمة العالمية للبرلمانيين ضد الفساد Organisation mondiale des parlementaires contre la corruption Organización Mundial de Parlamentarios Contra la Corrupción
- Emblem
- Motto: Integrity, Democracy, and the Rule of Law
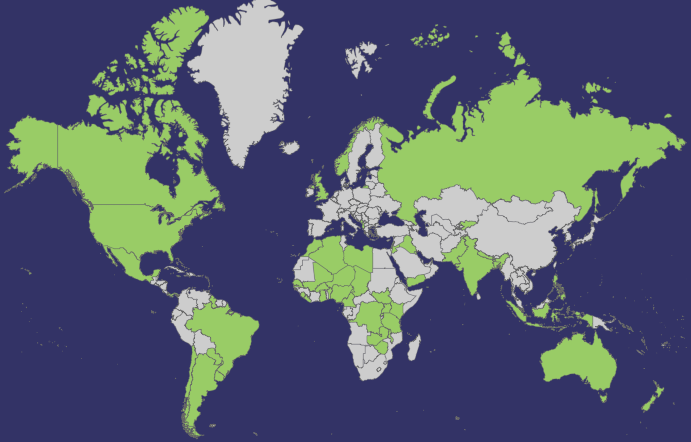
- GOPAC Member nations
- Global Secretariat: Doha
- Official languages: Arabic; English; French; Spanish
- Membership: 64 national chapters, 5 continental chapters

Leaders
  - Chair: (Qatar) H.E. Ali bin Fetais Al Marri

Establishment
  - GOPAC Charter signed: 6 October 2002
  - Entry into force of Charter: 1 January 2003
- Website gopacnetwork.org

The Global Organization of Parliamentarians Against Corruption (GOPAC; Arabic: المنظمة العالمية للبرلمانيين ضد الفساد; French: Organisation mondiale des parlementaires contre la corruption; Spanish: "Organización Mundialde Parlamentarios Contra la Corrupción") is an international nongovernmental organization made up of parliamentarians from across the world, working together to combat corruption, strengthen good government, and uphold the rule of law. Based in Ottawa, Ontario, Canada, GOPAC has sixty-four national chapters in five continental associations. GOPAC supports its members through original research, global anti‑corruption capacity building, and international peer support.

GOPAC seeks to achieve ethical and accountable governance throughout the world, through effective anti-corruption mechanisms and co-operation between parliamentarians, government leaders, and civil society.

== History ==
GOPAC was founded in October 2002 as a result of a Global Conference in Ottawa, Ontario, Canada which brought together approximately 170 parliamentarians and 400 observers who were the part of the international leadership in the fight against political corruption and for good governance.

As it has grown, GOPAC has formed a web of partnerships with other international institutions, including the United Nations Convention against Corruption, the Inter-Parliamentary Union, the World Bank, and Transparency International.

== Organization ==
GOPAC works internationally, and is present on every populated continent of the world. It operates in four official languages: Arabic; English; French; and Spanish.

=== Membership ===
Individual membership in GOPAC is open to current and former democratically elected legislators.

There are also National Chapters in sixty-four countries, grouped into five continental regions: Africa; Latin America; Oceania; Arab; and Southeast Asia.

Individual legislators may be members of GOPAC even if there is no national chapter in their countries. Similarly, national chapters can be members of GOPAC even if their continent has not formed a continental association.

=== Global Task Forces ===
GOPAC has five thematic Global Task Forces (GTFs): Anti-Money Laundering; Parliamentary Ethics and Conduct; Parliamentary Oversight; Participation of Society, and the United Nations Convention Against Corruption; and its Women in Parliament Network.

=== Global Conference ===
Every two years, GOPAC convenes a Global Conference to act as an international focus for parliamentarians from across the world to set the international agenda, and to collaborate in fighting political corruption. The 2019 Global Conference was held in Doha, Qatar.
