= Founding =

Founding may refer to:

- The formation of a corporation, government, or other organization
- The laying of a building's foundation
- The casting of materials in a mold

== See also ==
- Foundation (disambiguation)
- Incorporation (disambiguation)
