= Foundation (b-boy book) =

2009 book by Joseph G. Schloss

- Author: Joseph G. Schloss
- Language: English
- Subject: Hip hop
- Genre: Non-fiction
- Publisher: Oxford University Press
- Publication date: 2009
- Publication place: United States
- Pages: 176 pp
- ISBN: 978-0-19-533406-7

Foundation: B-boys, B-girls and Hip-Hop Culture in New York is a book by Joseph G. Schloss which looks at b-boying and the culture surrounding it. It features excerpts from interviews the author did with major figures in the b-boying world such as Ken Swift of Rock Steady Crew, Alien Ness, and Trac 2.

Joseph Schloss is an Adjunct Associate Professor of Black and Latino Studies and Sociology at City University of New York and also lecturers at Princeton University. Schloss attended every b-boy event in New York City for five years, learning b-boying as he researched the book.

The book makes arguments against other hip-hop non-fiction books, mainly saying they do not engage the actual hip-hop/b-boy communities enough when doing scholarship of this kind.

== Reception ==
The Boston Globe calls it "the best work ever produced on b-boying, and one of the finest books yet to emerge from the swiftly proliferating ranks of hip-hop scholarship". It has also received positive reviews from Liberator Magazine and Jeff Chang.

== Notes ==
- Schloss, Joseph Glenn (2009). Foundation : b-boys, b-girls, and hip-hop culture in New York. Oxford: Oxford University Press. ISBN 978-0-19-533406-7. OCLC 672235958.
