= Foundation =

Foundation(s) or The Foundation(s) may refer to:

== Common uses ==
- Foundation (cosmetics), a skin-coloured makeup cream applied to the face
- Foundation (engineering), the element of a structure which connects it to the ground, and transfers loads from the structure to the ground
- Foundation (evidence), a legal term
- Foundation (nonprofit), a type of charitable organization
  - Foundation (United States law), a type of charitable organization in the U.S.
  - Private foundation, a charitable organization that might not qualify as a public charity by government standards

== Arts, entertainment, and media ==
=== Film and TV ===
- The Foundation, a film about 1960s – 1970s Aboriginal history in Sydney, featuring Gary Foley
- The Foundation (1984 TV series), a Hong Kong series
- The Foundation (Canadian TV series), a 2009–2010 Canadian sitcom
- "The Foundation" (Seinfeld), an episode
- Foundation (TV series), an Apple TV+ series adapted from Isaac Asimov's novels

=== Games ===
- Foundation (video game), a city-building game (2025)
- Foundation: Galactic Frontier
- Foundation, an Amiga video game
- The Foundation, a character in 2017 game Fortnite Battle Royale
- Magic: The Gathering: Foundations, a Magic: The Gathering core set.

=== Literature ===
- Foundation (book series), a series of science fiction books by Isaac Asimov
  - Foundation (Asimov novel), the first book in Asimov's series, published in 1951
- Foundation (b-boy book), by Joseph G. Schloss
- Foundation (Lackey novel), a 2008 fantasy novel by Mercedes Lackey
- The SCP Foundation, a fictional organization that is often referred to in-universe as "The Foundation"

=== Music ===
- The Foundations, a British soul group
- Foundations (EP), by Serj Tankian

==== Albums ====
- Foundation (Brand Nubian album)
- Foundation (Breakage album)
- Foundation (Doc Watson album)
- Foundation (Magnum album)
- Foundation (M.O.P. album)
- Foundation, a 1997 compilation album by Die Krupps
- The Foundation (Geto Boys album)
- The Foundation (Pep Love album), 2005
- The Foundation (Zac Brown Band album)
- The Foundations (album), by 4 Corners

==== Songs ====
- "Foundation", a 1983 song by Spandau Ballet from the album True
- "Foundation", a 1998 song by Brand Nubian from the eponymous album Foundation
- "Foundation", a 2009 song by M.O.P. from the eponymous album Foundation
- "Foundation", a 2010 song by Breakage from the eponymous album Foundation
- "Foundation", a 2015 song by Years & Years from Communion
- "Foundations" (song), by Kate Nash
- "The Foundation" (song), by Xzibit

=== Other uses in arts, entertainment, and media ===
- Foundation – The International Review of Science Fiction, a literary journal
- The Foundation Trilogy (BBC Radio), a radio adaption of Asimov's series

== Education ==
- Foundation degree, a British academic qualification
- Foundation school, a type of school in England and Wales
- Foundation Stage, a stage of education for children aged 3 to 5 in England
- University Foundation Programme, a British university entrance course

== Science and technology ==
- Foundation (framework), a free collection of tools for creating websites and web applications by ZURB
- Foundation Fieldbus, a communications system
- Foundation Kit, an Apple API

== Companies ==
- Foundation Medicine, a genomic profiling company
- Foundation, Inc. or Foundation Future Industries, an American robotics company

== Non-profits ==
- Foundation for Responsible Robotics

== See also ==
- Foundations of mathematics, theory of mathematics
