= Found (novel) =

2014 novel by Harlan Coben

- Author: Harlan Coben
- Language: English
- Genre: Thriller, mystery, suspense
- Publisher: Penguin Young Readers Group
- Publication date: September 9, 2014
- Publication place: United States
- Media type: Print (hardback, paperback), e-book, audiobook
- Pages: 336
- ISBN: 9780147515742

Found is the third book in Harlan Coben's young adult series featuring Mickey Bolitar. This series is a spin-off of Coben's popular Myron Bolitar novels. Found continues the story of Mickey, who is still grappling with the aftermath of his father's death. The narrative unfolds eight months after the tragic event, during which Mickey has been dealing with a slew of mysteries and dark secrets.

== Plot ==
The story picks up eight months after Mickey witnessed the death of his father. Haunted by the possibility that his father's death might not have been accidental, Mickey, along with his friends Ema, Spoon, and his uncle Myron, delve deeper into uncovering the truth. The narrative begins with Mickey witnessing his father's coffin being exhumed, revealing suspicious contents that raise more questions than answers.

Mickey faces typical teenage challenges, such as fitting in at school and dealing with relationships, while simultaneously being involved in high-stakes mysteries. One major plotline involves Mickey trying to find Ema's missing online boyfriend, who might not even exist. Another subplot includes Mickey helping his nemesis, Troy Taylor, who tested positive for drugs and seeks to clear his name. As the mysteries intensify, Mickey and his friends risk their lives to uncover the truth, leading to a shocking climax that provides both resolution and new beginnings for the characters.

== Publication ==
Harlan Coben's Found was released on September 9, 2014, by Penguin Young Readers Group, and available in hardcover, paperback, e-book, and audiobook formats.

== Reception ==
Overall, critics appreciated Found for its fast-paced and engaging narrative, strong character development, and ability to blend mystery and adventure with the everyday experiences of adolescence. The book was noted for its appeal to both young adult and adult readers, maintaining the quality and excitement established in the first two books of the series.

Kirkus Reviews praised Found for maintaining a swift pace and keeping readers engaged throughout the narrative. They highlighted the book's ability to balance high school challenges with more intense, mysterious plotlines, making it an exciting read for both teens and adults.

Linda Wilson from Crime Review acknowledged the book's appeal to young adult readers, particularly those who enjoy a mix of mystery and adventure. They highlighted the strong character development and the interplay between the more fantastical elements and the everyday struggles of teenage life.
