= PISCES =

Database system that's used for border control

PISCES (Personal Identification Secure Comparison and Evaluation System) is a border control database system largely based on biometrics developed by Booz Allen Hamilton Inc.

== Overview ==
The PISCES-project was initiated by the Department of State, Terrorist Interdiction Program (TIP) in 1997, initially as a system for countries in improving their watchlisting capabilities by providing a mainframe computer system to facilitate immigration processing in half a dozen countries. Foreign authorities used the technology to watchlist and exchange information with the United States Department of State about suspected terrorists appearing at their borders. The information is used to track and apprehend individual terrorists, not for wide-ranging analysis of terrorist travel methods, according to US-government reports. It matches passengers inbound for the United States against facial images, fingerprints and biographical information at airports in high-risk countries. A high-speed data network permits U.S. authorities to be informed of problems with inbound passengers.

PISCES workstations installed throughout a country are linked by wide area network to the participating nation's immigration, police or intelligence headquarters. The headquarters is provided with the automated capability to monitor activities at immigration points, evaluate traveler information and conduct real time data analysis.

Currently the PISCES-project falls under The Terrorist Interdiction Program (TIP), an ongoing programme of the United States Department of State. TIP provides all necessary software and hardware (mostly commercial and off-the-shelf, such as cameras and passport scanners), full installation, operator training, and system sustainment. Additionally, TIP assists with immigration business process improvement at ports of entry chosen for PISCES installation.

For FY 2007, funds will be used to support enhancements to the existing watch listing system software in order to provide a fraudulent document detection capability, a biometrics search capability, and improved name-searching effectiveness.

Starting in FY 2010 and onward to FY 2011, PISCES funding will be increased in what the United States Department of State considers "high risk" countries such as Afghanistan, Iraq, and Pakistan. A project to verify US visas via limited access to a US government database will go under trial in select outposts.

== Controversy ==
=== Effectiveness ===
Although PISCES was operational in the months prior to September 11 attacks in 2001, it apparently failed to detect any of the terrorists involved in the attack.

According to the US Department of State:

- TIP provided photos and travel history to Pakistan of three of the four July 7, 2005 London Metro bombers.
- Within one week of TIP's introduction, a ring of human traffickers was identified at Chiang Mai, Thailand.
- Hundreds of travelers have been interdicted in Pakistan on suspicion of using stolen passports.

When asked if there had been any feedback regarding the effectiveness of the PISCES system, Joseph Adam Ereli said that while they received general feedback on how the system was functioning and areas for improvement, there was no specific information linking it to particular arrests. However, when asked if the program had been effective and a good investment, he agreed, saying that it was an important program that provided countries with new capabilities and strengthened coordination and cooperation—both critical in the fight against terrorism.

A 2021 study examining the use of PISCES in Kenya found that immigration officers experienced increased efficiency and reduced identity fraud due to the system’s biometric verification capabilities.

=== Data-handling ===
- INTERPOL: "... TIP will also assist the upgrading of INTERPOL's communications system to transmit fingerprints, photos and other graphics on a near-real time basis to and from a participating country's INTERPOL National Central Bureau (NCB). INTERPOL data can then be imported into PISCES to expand the pool of suspects."

== Deployment ==
In 2003: "[…] is currently being deployed in five countries and is scheduled for deployment in 12 more countries this calendar year. Arrests and detentions have occurred in all five countries where the system has been deployed."

In 2005: "Since 2001, twenty nations have been provided this capability"

Expected 2011: 31

=== Currently deployed ===
Maldives
PISCES was deployed in Maldives at 0000hrs on 20 August 2013, replacing the border control system developed and installed by NexBiz of Malaysia.
Iraq
FY 2007, NADR/Terrorist Interdiction Program funding is requested to support efforts to disrupt the travel of terrorists into Iraq by increasing the number of Iraqi ports of entry equipped with and capable of effectively operating the program's PISCES watchlisting system.
Pakistan
FY 2002, PISCES system has been installed at seven major airports of the country i.e. Islamabad, Karachi, Lahore, Peshawar, Quetta, Multan and Faisalabad airports. The system has provision to accommodate information on suspects from all law enforcement agencies like Immigration, Police, Narcotics Control, Anti-smuggling, and Intelligence Services.
Malta
Inaugurated May 5, 2004 by the Deputy Prime Minister and Minister for Justice and Home Affairs Dr Tonio Borg and United States Ambassador Anthony H. Gioia. PISCES is being provided by the United States at no cost to Malta, and assistance will include installation of the system, training of immigration officials on use of PISCES, and maintenance of the system. The overall U.S. assistance to Malta for this program is valued at approximately $US 1.5 million, nearly Lm700,000.
Thailand
March 2004, during his visit to Thailand, Secretary Ridge and I witnessed the signing of the Memorandum of Intent for Provision of a Terrorist Interdiction Program Border Control System. Under this Memorandum, the Personal Identification Secure Comparison and Evaluation System, known in short as PISCES, could be used to screen people passing through Thailand's ports of entry, so that we may be able to detect suspected terrorists.
In FY 2007, NADR/TIP funds will be used to expand the operation of the program's watchlisting computer system to additional ports of entry and provide for system software upgrades as they become available.
Bangladesh
Memorandum of understanding signed in May 2004, renewable agreement would be valid for five years. Relevant portions of PISCES will immediately become operational at the capital's Shahjalal International Airport and later expand to cover all land, sea and airports.
Tanzania
The State Department's counterterrorism bureau is funding the "PISCES" (Personal Identification Secure Comparison System) program to improve interdiction capabilities at major border crossings. While the program targets terrorist activities, it has implications for narcotics and other smuggling as well.
Cambodia
FY 2007, NADR Terrorist Interdiction Program (NADR/TIP) funds will be used to sustain a computerized system for collecting, comparing and analyzing traveler data to identify possible terrorists, and provide for software upgrades to the system as they become available.
Philippines
In FY 2007, NADR/TIP funds will be used to expand the operation of the program's watchlisting computer system to additional ports of entry in the Republic of the Philippines, and provide for system software upgrades as they become available.
Kosovo
FY 2009, NADR Terrorism Interdiction Program funding will sustain existing program operations and provide for software upgrades to program equipment.
Macedonia
FY 2007, NADR Terrorism Interdiction Program funding will sustain existing program operations and provide for software upgrades to program equipment.
Côte d'Ivoire
FY 2009, NADR Terrorism Interdiction Program funding will sustain existing program operations and provide for software upgrades to program equipment. "The Ivoirian Ministry of Interior, in cooperation with the United States, uses PISCES to enhance border security at its major airport and seaport.": On August 6, 2009, Ivoirian authorities detained Imam Abd al Menhem Qubaysi, a Hizballah spiritual leader and US-designated terrorist financier, at the airport upon his arrival on a commercial flight from Lebanon. Qubaysi, who lived in Côte d'Ivoire for a number of years, was denied entry at immigration and returned to Lebanon on the same flight through the use of PISCES.
Bosnia and Herzegovina
On 27 March 2018, the country and the US government signed a Memorandum of Intention on the donation of a System for Personal Identification Secure Comparison and Evaluation (PISCES). In cooperation with Bosnia's Council of Ministers, the US government aims to install and maintain all the hardware and software required for the PISCES system to operate, starting with the Sarajevo International Airport and later expanding to other airports and border crossings in the country.
Kenya
Since mid-2003, the Terrorist Interdiction Program computer system has been operational at select airports; scheduled for NADR-TIP funding in FY 2007. Known to be operational as of 2025.
Tanzania
Since mid-2003, the Terrorist Interdiction Program computer system has been operational at select airports; scheduled for NADR-TIP funding in FY 2007. Known to be operational as of 2025.
Ethiopia
Since mid-2003, the Terrorist Interdiction Program computer system has been operational at select airports; scheduled for NADR-TIP funding in FY 2007. Known to be operational as of 2025.
Djibouti
Was expected to be operational in 2004; scheduled for NADR-TIP funding in FY 2007. Known to be operational as of 2025.
Burkina Faso
Deployed as part of broader U.S. counterterrorism efforts. Known to be operational as of 2025.
Somalia
PISCES was launched at key border control points across the country, including Aden Adde International Airport in Mogadishu, in July 2025.

=== Expected future deployment ===
- Algeria. In FY 2007, NADR/Terrorism Interdiction Program (TIP) assistance is requested to implement new program operations and equipment that Algeria will use in support of the ongoing Global War on Terrorism.
- Morocco. In FY 2007, NADR/Terrorism Interdiction Program (TIP) assistance is requested to implement new program operations and equipment that Morocco will use in support of the ongoing Global War on Terrorism.
- Tunisia. NADR/Terrorist Interdiction Program (TIP) funds are requested to launch program operations and provide necessary equipment.
- Yemen. NADR/Terrorism Interdiction Program (TIP) assistance is requested to implement new and increased program operations and provide equipment that Yemen will use in support of the ongoing Global War on Terrorism.
- Afghanistan PISCES Program started in Afghanistan on 2002 from Kabul International Airport and successfully expanded into 12 other POEs.
- Tajikistan. In May 2024, Tajikistan and the U.S. signed a memorandum of understanding regarding Tajikistan's deployment of PISCES.

=== Former deployment ===
- Azerbaijan: Part of Canadian Bank Note Company ID card and passport-issuing and inspection system in Azerbaijan was a bsorder control system that replaced the State Departments's Pisces system in Azerbaijan. No TIP-funding FY 2007.
- Nicaragua In 2003, post began the deployment of a new immigration computer system called PISCES. The contractor made the original equipment installations, but was unable to follow through with making the system operational due to the greater demand to bring the system on line in the Middle East. PISCES should be operational in 2005. The contractor will provide training to Nicaraguan Immigration personnel. No TIP-funding FY 2007

=== Unclear ===
- Ghana, Senegal, Zambia and Georgia were scheduled for NADR-TIP funding in FY 2007.
- Uganda is expected to be operational this year (2004); scheduled for NADR-TIP funding in FY 2007

== See also ==
- Booz Allen Hamilton
