= No-kill shelter =

Animal shelter that generally does not euthanize animals

A no-kill shelter is an animal shelter that does not kill healthy or treatable animals based on time limits or capacity, reserving euthanasia for terminally ill animals, animals suffering poor quality of life, or those considered dangerous to public safety. Some no-kill shelters will commit to not killing any animals at all, under any circumstance, except as required by law. A no-kill shelter uses many strategies to promote shelter animals; to expand its resources using volunteers, housing and medical protocols; and to work actively to lower the number of homeless animals entering the shelter system. Up to ten percent of animals could be killed in a no-kill shelter and still be considered a no-kill shelter.

== Definition ==
A no-kill shelter is a shelter that saves healthy, treatable and rehabilitatable animals and reduces their euthanasia rates by screening and selecting the animals they bring into their care, known as a limited admission shelter. As a benchmark, at least 90% of the animals entering the shelter are expected to be saved. The save rate must be based on all animals entering the shelter.

=== Adoptability issue ===
Some shelters claim they are no kill when they save all "adoptable" animals, but continue to kill many healthy, treatable, or rehabilitatable animals, such as feral cats. No kill advocate Nathan Winograd states that a Los Angeles animal shelter "was claiming to be saving almost all 'adoptable' animals even while it was killing half the dogs and 80% of all cats. A shelter does not achieve No Kill by calling animals 'unadoptable' before killing them; it achieves No Kill by actually saving their lives."

== International ==
=== India ===
India has the world's oldest no-kill traditions. The earliest instances of high volume spaying/neutering of stray dogs were done in India. In 1994, the city of Mumbai agreed to handle dog control on a no-kill basis. In 1998, the Indian government announced the goal of the whole country becoming no-kill by 2005. At that time, cities such as Delhi, Chennai and Jaipur had already adopted no-kill.

=== Italy ===
Italy has outlawed the euthanasia of healthy companion animals since 1991 and controls stray populations through trap, neuter and return programs. A compilation of 10 years' worth of data on feral cat colonies in Rome has shown that although trap-neuter-return decreased the cat population, pet abandonment was a significant problem. Dog attacks on Italian citizens and tourists have been blamed on a lack of enforcement of animal control laws in the country.

=== Poland ===
The Polish law prohibits the killing of animals, therefore all Polish shelters are no-kill. The only exception are sick animals, especially those suffering or endangering by their sickness other animals. Blind litters are also excluded from the legal protection of life, it is recognized that due to their dependence, they can be killed. Such legislation has led to a situation in which some shelters conceal the possession of dogs from their owners in order to increase profits - the stay of dogs in shelters is paid by the government at a daily rate.

=== Portugal ===
In Portugal, euthanasia is practiced at publicly owned kennels although several different associations actively shelter strays. Among those is Patas Errantes, a non-profit private organization founded in 2006 which practices a policy of taking dogs off the street, vaccinating and sterilizing them, and either returning them to the streets or finding them new owners. Liga Portuguesa dos Direitos do Animal, a public utility state-recognized organization founded in 1981, is also quite active in animal sterilization and fights for no-kill. Sintra town kennel is noted for having ceased euthanasia practices in their kennel. However, the shelter admits that during the holidays, it is so overwhelmed with unwanted and discarded animals that euthanasia is required for humane reasons.

=== Puerto Rico ===
Pets Alive is an American no-kill shelter, based in Middletown, NY, who used to operate in Puerto Rico, rescuing canines from "Dead Dog Beach", where people leave their strays. It shipped some of the dogs to their Middletown, Orange County, New York location in New York.

=== United Kingdom ===
The UK animal charity Dogs Trust states in its constitution that "no mentally and physically healthy dog taken into the protection of the rescue/re-homing centres shall be destroyed." The charity runs 17 rehoming centres, which care for 16,000 dogs a year and house 1,400 dogs at any one time. It also operates a sanctuary for dogs that are unadoptable.

In 2012 the RSPCA announced plans to end the euthanasia of any rehomeable animals in their care by 2017. However, the charity recognizes that this cannot be done without major changes in the public's behaviour, including spaying and neutering owned animals and making long term commitments to animal companions.

The Scottish SPCA operate on a no kill basis unless given veterinary advice that an animal is so ill or in such pain that the kindest decision is to end their suffering, or if they are so dangerously aggressive that they could not be rehomed safely.

Coventry Cat Group are a no-kill shelter based in the Midlands. With the exception of veterinary recommendation, all animals within the charity's care are socialised with a view to either domestication or being homed in farming environments.

=== United States ===
In 1903, Flora Kibbe established the Bideawee Home for Animals in Manhattan as a non-kill shelter.

In the U.S., the no-kill concept received a legal boost in 1998 when the state of California passed three pieces of legislation directed to reduce animal suffering at animal shelters in California: the Vincent Law, which requires shelters to spay or neuter animals prior to adoption; the Hayden Law, which requires that shelters cooperate with rescue groups; and the Kopp Law, which prohibited the use of carbon monoxide to euthanize animals. No-Kill shelters received a financial boost with the establishment of Maddie's Fund in 1999, from which a number of communities in the United States have since received millions in financial grants.

In 1994, San Francisco popularized the trend towards No-kill shelters. The San Francisco SPCA, led by President Richard Avanzino who would later become the President of Maddie's Fund, along with the San Francisco Department of Animal Care and Control guaranteed a home to every "adoptable" dog and cat who entered the shelter system. Since then San Francisco (the SPCA along with the Department of Animal Care and Control) has been able to keep San Francisco as a no-kill city. In 2007, the live release rate of all dogs and cats in the city of San Francisco was 82%. In 2010, the live release rate of all dogs and cats in San Francisco was 86%. In November 2010, the city voted to table indefinitely a proposed mandate to require city animal shelters to adopt "no-kill" policies. The live release rate of the San Francisco SPCA in 2012 was self-reported as 97.79%.

Starting in 2001, Tompkins SPCA, an open-admission shelter and animal control facility for Tompkins County, New York transitioned over a two-year period to a no-kill shelter. Tompkins SPCA was able to achieve this while going from having a budget deficit to a budget surplus and was even able to raise millions of dollars to build a new cageless no-kill shelter. Tompkins SPCA was able to achieve a live release rate of over 90% every year since then. In 2006, 145 dogs and cats classified as unhealthy or untreatable were euthanized (6% of a total intake of 2,353). In comparison, the national average rate of euthanasia in 2005 was 56%.

In 2009, Shelby County, Kentucky, became the first no-kill community in Kentucky through a joint effort of the county shelter and the Shelby Humane Society.

In March 2010, the Austin, Texas City Council unanimously passed a resolution for the City's open-admission shelter to achieve a 90% save rate of all impounded animals. The City Council mandated, among other things, that the City shelter was prohibited from killing healthy, adoptable pets while there were empty cages at the shelter. From 1998 to 2011, the euthanasia rate of animals that entered the Austin, TX, city shelter went from 85% to less than 10%, and as of 2011 Austin is the largest no-kill city in the United States. In August 2011, the City celebrated its highest save-rate month ever, in which the shelter saved 96% of all impounded animals.

In May 2010, three communities announced a pact to become no-kill communities by guaranteeing homes for all healthy and treatable pets: Hastings and Rosemount, Minnesota, along with Prescott, Wisconsin.

In November 2010, the Upper Peninsula Animal Welfare Shelter, an open-admission shelter in Marquette, Michigan, announced that it had achieved no-kill status.

In December 2010, the Williamson County Regional Animal Shelter, an open-admission shelter located in Georgetown, Texas, achieved and has since maintained no-kill status. On February 13, 2019, Williamson County Regional Animal Shelter received a $900,000 grant from the Petco Foundation for its no-kill and community efforts.

From 2014 to 2018, the city of Jacksonville, Florida, achieved no-kill status.

The Best Friends Animal Sanctuary near Kanab, Utah is a no-kill animal sanctuary providing homes for thousands of homeless pets. With financial help from Maddie's Fund totaling over $9 million spread over five years, they led a coalition of rescue groups called "No More Homeless Pets in Utah". The goal of the coalition was to move the state of Utah closer to a no-kill community. In the period from 1999 to 2006, the organization reported that statewide adoption rate increased 39% while euthanasia rate dropped 30%.

The No-Kill Declaration, published by the No Kill Advocacy Center and Alley Cat Allies, defines many of the goals of no-kill sheltering. These organizations claim that over 30,000 US-based groups and individuals have signed this declaration.

== Issues ==
=== Labeling ===
Although proponents of no-kill make the distinction between euthanasia and killing, some still assert that the term "no-kill" is unfair to employees of traditional shelters. The term has also caused a divide in the animal welfare community beyond ideology as it differentiates between no-kill and "kill" shelters, an accusation that cast a bad light on traditional shelters. Professor of Sociology and Anthropology Arnold Arluke has argued that "The no-kill perspective has damaged the community that long existed among shelter workers, changing how they think and feel about each other. The vast majority of shelter workers suddenly are thought of as cruel; five million deaths each year are seen as avoidable rather than inevitable, as previously thought. The no-kill idea created culpability within the shelter world; open-admissionists became the guilty party." Nathan Winograd, generally considered the leader of the no-kill movement, makes no apology for the differentiation, and states that the No-Kill ideology is "A Reason for Hope."

=== Mandatory spay/neuter ===
While some shelter professionals have called for mandatory spay/neuter laws, the American Society for the Prevention of Cruelty to Animals states that although voluntary sterilization of owned pets has been demonstrated to reduce the number of animals entering animal shelters, mandating spay and neuter for owned pets has not been demonstrated to reduce shelter intake or euthanasia.

=== Failed attempts ===
In 2008, the Humane Society of Tacoma and Pierce County, in Tacoma, Washington, backed away from its no-kill commitment, acknowledging the difficulties encountered in trying to keep animals alive. In announcing their decision, the shelter president stated "that because we are an open shelter that will accept every animal that comes to us, regardless of its medical or behavior problems, true 'no-kill' status will never be a reality." The shelter has now switched from no-kill to "Counting Down to Zero", a coordinated effort to reduce euthanasia.

In 2009, the Newfoundland and Labrador, Canada provincial government and the town of Stephenville began negotiations to close their no-kill animal shelter, claiming that upwards of 100 dogs and cats with diseases or behavioral problems were suffering severe neglect. Media quoted the town's mayor as stating that animals cannot be humanely stored indefinitely. The animals in the shelter will be evaluated by veterinarians but will most likely be euthanized.

In 2019, two no-kill shelters faced violations due to inhumane conditions, neglect, and deaths. PAWS for Life was forced to forfeit its license after just three months of running the city of Pueblo animal shelter, due to the inhumane conditions which led to the shelter director and veterinarian to face criminal charges.

A no-kill policy led to a dispute between the Toronto Humane Society and the Ontario Society for the Prevention of Cruelty to Animals in 2009, with the OSPCA revoking the THS' credentials for several months while it conducted an investigation. Several staff and officers with the THS were arrested, although all of the charges were eventually dropped.

=== Numbers ===
Limited admission "no-kill" shelters screen all animals for health and behavior, selecting those which are considered adoptable and less likely to require euthanasia, as well as other strategies.

Dame Magazine's Carol Mithers wrote in 2019 that "another unfortunate reality of the 90 percent 'no kill' goal is that even when reached, it may be less real than it appears. Shelters under public and political pressure to have 'good' euthanasia numbers also have the incentive to play good numbers games, whether that means adopting out sick or potentially dangerous animals to avoid having to put them down or conversely calling them 'untreatable' so they can be euthanized without marring the live release rate."

=== Burden on municipal shelters ===
Many of the animals rejected by no-kill shelters still end up being euthanized at municipal and open-admission shelters, who then face criticism for "high-kill" rates. Mithers stated that "even when adoption efforts successfully move adorable puppies and apartment-friendly small 'fluffies' to new homes, legions of the less desirable—seniors, overbred pit bulls, middle-aged chihuahuas—are left behind. This past June, TV station KVUE in 'no kill' Austin reported that the city's three shelters were at 'critical capacity' with nearly 800 dogs and cats, some of which had been held over 3 years."

== See also ==
- No Kill Equation
- No Kill Advocacy Center
- Overpopulation in domestic pets
