= No Kill Advocacy Center =

US non-profit organization

- Formation: 2004
- Type: non-profit s. 501(c)(3) charity
- Purpose: Advocacy to stop shelter killing
- Location: Oakland, California
- Key people: Nathan Winograd, Director
- Website: nokilladvocacycenter.org

Based in Oakland, California, the No Kill Advocacy Center is a non-profit organization led by Nathan Winograd, dedicated to expanding no kill animal sheltering across the United States.

== History ==
The No Kill Advocacy Center was founded in 2004 by Nathan Winograd, after he had "created the nation's first—and at the time, only—No Kill community" in Tompkins County, New York. Rather than accepting the typical approach of the humane movement "that the best shelters can do for homeless animals is to adopt out some and kill the rest", Winograd believed that a shelter could save "100 percent of healthy and treatable animals, and 100 percent of feral cats". He took on the position of shelter director for the SPCA of Tompkins County in June 2011, and was able to stop killing immediately. He continued at the position for three years, solidifying the approach, and developing the No Kill Equation, a "roadmap to No Kill" that other organizations could follow.

Winograd created the No Kill Advocacy Center to advise other organizations and expand no-kill animal sheltering across the United States. At the start of 2012, thirty no kill communities had been identified; by the end of the year there were almost 90. In 2013, hundreds of communities in the United States were reported as saving from 90% to 99% of impounded animals using the No Kill Equation model of sheltering. A new community announced its No Kill status about every week. Winograd stated that the successes of no kill communities "prove that there is a formula for lifesaving, and that if we are to achieve a No Kill nation, it is incumbent upon shelters nationwide to embrace the programs and services which have been proven to save lives".

== No Kill Equation ==
The "No Kill Equation" is 11 requirements that they consider essential to create communities that do not kill unwanted pets. They are:

1. Trap–neuter–return (TNR) programs for free-living cats allow shelters to reduce death rates.
2. No- and low-cost, high-volume spay/neuter services
3. Cooperation with rescue groups
4. Foster care programs
5. Comprehensive adoption programs
6. Pet retention programs
7. Medical and behavior rehabilitation programs
8. Public Relations/Community Development
9. Volunteer programs
10. Proactive redemptions
11. A compassionate shelter director

== No Kill Conference ==
The No Kill Advocacy Center held its first annual No Kill Conference in 2005, with Winograd as the only speaker, and less than two dozen in attendance. The 2012 conference had 33 speakers, including shelter directors with save rates as high as 98%. Attendance jumped from 300 the previous year, to nearly 900. Half of the attendees were from shelters, many of them municipal shelters which historically had "acrimony with the rescue and no kill community but were embracing it in droves in 2012."

The 2013 conference, hosted jointly with the Animal Law Program at George Washington University in Washington, D.C., included participants from 44 states and 10 countries. Workshops included No Kill 101, Adopting Your Way Out of Killing, Shelter Medicine for Non-Veterinarians, and Using Technology to Save Lives. Free admission was offered to directors of animal control agencies, with reduced admission for rescue groups and students. A participant from No Kill Harford, an organization dedicated to bringing the movement to Harford County, Maryland, described the conference as "an amazing opportunity to network with people who have actually succeeded at transforming their local open admission animal shelters from a place where the majority of animals are killed to a place where almost all are saved".

== Redemption: The No Kill Revolution in America ==
In 2014, the organization produced a film, Redemption: The No Kill Revolution in America. The film won the Audience award in the San Pedro International Film Festival in San Pedro, California.

== Henry Bergh Leadership Award ==
In December 2009, the organization began to issue Henry Bergh Leadership Awards to individuals making a difference to the no kill movement in the U.S. and internationally. Past recipients include:

- 2009:
  - Bonney Brown, as executive director of the Nevada Humane Society, for raising Washoe County, Nevada save rates to over 90%, despite high intake rates and an economic downturn;
  - Susanne Kogut, executive director of the Charlottesville SPCA, for creating a no kill community for three successive years in Charlottesville, Virginia;
  - Ryan Clinton of FixAustin of Austin, Texas, for successfully campaigning for a no kill city;
  - Mike Fry and Beth Nelson of Animal Wise Radio, for promoting the No Kill philosophy while running Animal Ark, Minnesota's largest no kill shelter;
  - Joan Schaffner, Director of the Animal Law Program at George Washington University Law School, for hosting the No Kill Conference, and for a book on litigating animal law disputes; and
  - Claire Davis, President of the Coalition for a No Kill King County in King County, Washington, for successfully advocating for reform to increase save rates at county animal shelters.
- 2010:
  - New York State Assembly member Micah Kellner for efforts to reform state shelters and protect First Amendment rights of volunteers;
  - Kelly Jedlicki of No Kill Mission, who advocated for Shelby County, Kentucky to become Kentucky's first no kill community;
  - Jane Pierantozzi, who spearheaded the Delaware Companion Animal Protection Act;
  - Mitch Schneider of Washoe County Regional Animal Services in Nevada, who led the county's 95% save rate despite an economic downturn; and
  - Robyn Kippenberger of the Royal New Zealand Society for the Prevention of Cruelty to Animals, for campaigning for New Zealand to become a no kill nation.
- 2011:
  - Ellen Jefferson of Austin Pets Alive in Austin, Texas, who developed programs resulting in the largest U.S. city saving 90% of impounded animals;
  - Larry Tucker of the Animal Advisory Commission of Austin, Texas, for his role as one of the founders of Austin's no kill plan;
  - Aimee Sadler of the Longmont Humane Society in Longmont, Colorado, for saving 97% of dogs, and raising expectations of dogs that can be saved through behavior training, including maligned pit bull breeds;
  - Peter Masloch of No Kill Allegany County in Allegany County, Maryland, for advocating to transform a shelter that was saving only 15% of animals to saving 94%; and
  - Michael Kitkoski of Rockwall, Texas, for successfully advocating for the city's resolution to become a no kill community.
- 2012:
  - Denise Jones of Shelby County Animal Control for helping to create Kentucky's first no kill community in Shelby County, and ensuring it stayed no kill later when the status was at risk;
  - Karl Bailey of Seagoville Animal Control in Seagoville, Texas, for ending the use of the gas chamber and shelter killing;
  - Holly Henderson for high save rates at the Chippewa County Animal Shelter in Chippewa County, Michigan;
  - Mike Fry for his work in the no kill Animal Ark in Hastings, Minnesota, and the "Just One Day" campaign (previous recipient in 2009);
  - Kerry Clair, then executive director of Pets Alive in Middletown, New York, for saving dogs not usually considered adoptable, and campaigning for shelter animal rights legislation; and
  - John Sibley of New York City, for saving dogs with terminal illnesses in a hospice foster care program, and campaigning for shelter animal rights legislation in New York state.
- 2013: none announced.
- 2017: Phil Peckinpaugh & Muncie Animal Care & Services. Under Phil Peckinpaugh's leadership, the vast majority of animals who come to Muncie Animal Shelter looking for a second chance and loving home roughly 97%—find it. That makes Muncie one of the safest communities for homeless animals in the United States. And it reached even higher by passing the strongest, most progressive animal protection law in the country, becoming the first American city to make it illegal to kill healthy and treatable animals.

== See also ==
- Overpopulation in domestic pets
- Trap-neuter-return
