= Alley Cat Allies =

American non-profit organization

- Founded: 1990
- Type: 501(c)(3)
- Purpose: Animal protection
- Headquarters: Bethesda, MD
- Location: Bethesda, Maryland
- Region served: US and globally
- Key people: Charlene Pedrolie, Chief Operating Officer
- Revenue: 17.9 million in 2023
- Website: www.alleycat.org

Alley Cat Allies is a nonprofit organization that advocates for reform of public policies and institutions in regard to the humane treatment of all cats. Based in Bethesda, Maryland, the group is best known for introducing trap–neuter–return (TNR) practices to the United States.

Alley Cat Allies focuses on stray and feral cat advocacy and TNR, the method of managing feral cat populations that the organization considers humane and effective. The organization helps launch or improve TNR programs and expand affordable spay and neuter services. Alley Cat Allies also educates the public about the number of cats killed annually in animal shelters and works to reform the shelter system to better serve the needs of feral cats.

== History ==
Alley Cat Allies was founded in 1990 after 56 cats and two smaller colonies were discovered in an alley in the Adams Morgan neighborhood of Washington, D.C. The cats were then neutered using the trap–neuter–return method. Deluged by requests for help with similar work, and aware of the lack of resources and information on the method, a network was formed for feral cats.

In 2000, Alley Cat Allies halted a catch-and-kill order at Norfolk Naval Shipyard in Portsmouth, Virginia, and instead instituted a TNR program, becoming the first animal protection group in the nation to hold a formal contract with the U.S. military. Also in 2000, Alley Cat Allies formed a coalition to stop a municipal order to catch and kill cats living on and under Atlantic City's boardwalk. With the city's cooperation, Alley Cat Allies staff and local volunteers began a TNR program for the boardwalk cats. The program was still operational in 2010.

In 2004, Alley Cat Allies created a TNR pilot program in Washington, DC. Two years later, the Washington Humane Society adopted TNR as its feral cat policy and opened a high-volume spay/neuter clinic with Alley Cat Allies. In the wake of Hurricane Katrina in 2005, Alley Cat Allies established a base camp and emergency shelter in Louisiana and sent 150 volunteers to help hundreds of cats displaced by the hurricane. In 2007, Alley Cat Allies helped the Baltimore City Council draft an ordinance that allowed residents to feed and provide shelter for managed feral cat colonies.

In 2018, Marc Gunther of The Chronicle of Philanthropy wrote that fiscal and organizational practices at Alley Cat Allies demonstrated a broader issue wherein "the vast majority of charities get little or no critical examination from ratings groups or regulators". Gunther reported that Alley Cat Allies had bought two homes, for $590,000 and $569,000, without disclosure to its full board. Gunther also wrote that Alley Cat Allies had pursued, "at considerable expense", a copyright lawsuit against a former staff member; Alley Cat Allies communicated that the lawsuit had been settled in 2016.

In November 2021, Alley Cat Allies filed a petition in the Supreme Court of Appeals of West Virginia for a writ of mandamus against Berkeley County Animal Control, based in Berkeley County, West Virginia. According to The Herald-Mail, the goal of the filing was to "compel the animal control group to comply with state law which states it is a crime to withhold necessary medical care to an animal." The county filed a motion to dismiss the petition, stating: "Alley Cat Allies does not seek a legal remedy; it seeks publicity and donations. The strategy is simple: file a suit, raise a hoot, and collect the loot."

Charlene Pedrolie is the president and chief operating officer of the organization.

== Operations ==
Alley Cat Allies created National Feral Cat Day in 2001, which it promotes every October 16. In 2017, the organization changed the event's name to Global Cat Day. On October 16, 2023, Alley Cat Allies conducted a program in Grand Cayman, providing spay/neuter surgeries for as many as 100 cats and distributing cat food. The Department of Environment praised the initiative, but noted that releasing cats into the wild is a violation of law. Cayman continues to exterminate outdoor cats on the islands as of March 26, 2026.

Alley Cat Allies' Feral Friends Network connects individuals to organizations, veterinarians, and others serving as resources on feral cats and TNR from around the world.

After tornadoes struck Oklahoma in April 2023, Alley Cat Allies provided support and care for animals affected by the tornadoes.

In 2023, after the fires in Maui, Hawaii, Alley Cat Allies delivered immediate support for cats and to helped provide for their recovery care.

Alley Cat Allies filed a lawsuit in March 2024 against the U.S. National Park Service four months after the federal agency announced it would contract an animal welfare organization to remove an estimated 200 cats that live in an area surrounding a historic seaside fortress in Old San Juan, Puerto Rico. In early September 2024, the U.S. National Park Service agreed to halt the removal of cats until a judge rules on the lawsuit filed by Alley Cat Allies. On May 20, 2026, Judge Randolph D. Moss ruled that Alley Cat Allies' lawsuit failed as a matter of law and the cats could be removed.

== Research and publications ==
- Trap-Neuter-Return Ordinances and Policies in the United States: The Future of Animal Control - In 2013, the organization published a document reviewing the treatment of feral cats in ordinances throughout the U.S. The study found that at least 240 local governments had enacted ordinances or policies supporting TNR (p. 4), a ten-fold increase from ten years earlier (p. 11).
- Scientific study of neuter status of U.S. pet cats - In 2009, Alley Cat Allies published Population Characteristics and Neuter Status of Cats Living in Households in the United States in the Journal of the American Veterinary Medical Association. "Findings suggested that a high percentage (80.0%) of cats living in households in the United States were neutered and that annual family income was the strongest predictor of whether cats in the household were neutered."
- U.S. Public Opinion on Humane Treatment of Stray Cats – In 2007, Alley Cat Allies published a document interpreting the results of a survey the organization hired Harris Interactive to conduct. The survey found that 81% of Americans consider it more humane to leave a cat outside where the cat is, rather than have the cat caught and "put down."

== See also ==
- No Kill Equation
- No-kill shelter
- Project Bay Cat, a similar project
