= Flora Kibbe =

American animal rights activist (1876–1943)

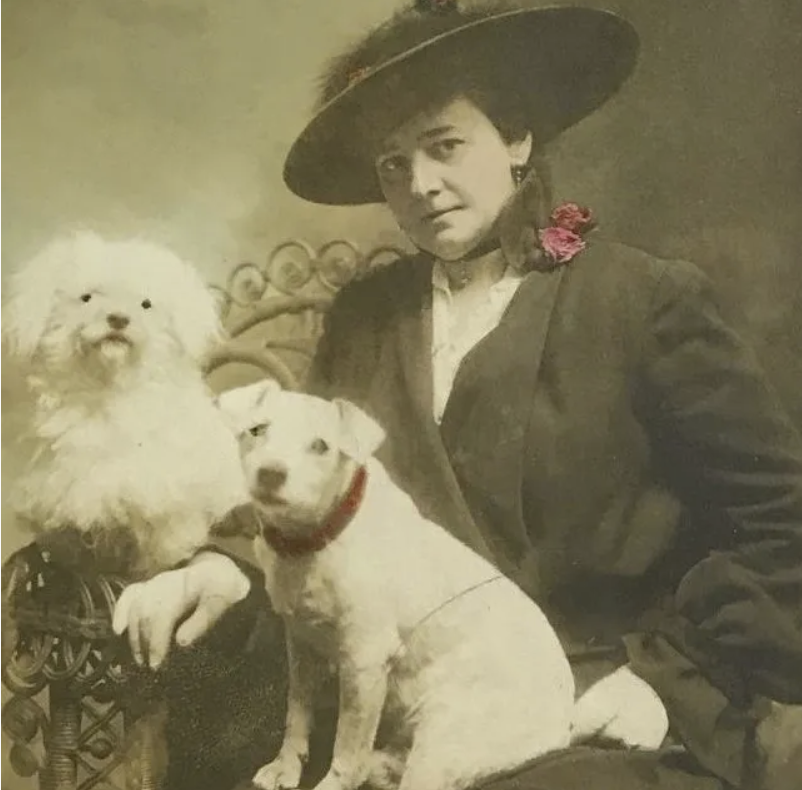
- Born: Flora D'Auby Jenkins; 1876; Utica, New York, U.S.
- Died: September 15, 1943 (aged 66–67); New York City, U.S.
- Occupation: Animal rights activist
- Known for: Founding the Bideawee Home for Animals
- Spouse: Harry Ulysses Kibbe (m. 1901)

Flora Rasor Kibbe (born Flora D'Auby Jenkins; 1876 – 15 September 1943) was an American animal rights activist and a pioneer in the animal rescue movement. She was the founder of Bideawee Home for Animals, one of the earliest no-kill shelters.

== Biography ==
=== Early life ===
Kibbe was born in Utica as Flora D'Auby Jenkins. She moved to New York City as an infant after he father died. As a young adult she travelled to Paris, where she observed the work of the Barrone d'Herpents Dog Refuge, which inspired her to establish her own animal shelter.

=== Bideawee Home for Animals ===
Kibbe founded the Bideawee Home for Animals in Manhattan in 1903. The purpose of Bideawee was to "spread the gospel of humanity toward dumb creatures by practical examples". As an animal shelter Bideawee provided a home for unwanted cats and dogs. The organization advocated a strict no-kill policy, meaning that no animal at the shelter was euthanized. Kibbe named the organization after a Scottish phrase "stay a while". The animals were to stay at the shelter even if they were not adopted. Bideawee also maintained a country home at Wantagh, with an adjoining animal cemetery. Another country home was established in Greenwich, Connecticut and a Bideawee shelter in Pasadena, California. The country home in Greenwich was situated on an old farm that cared for 200 dogs. Every dog was given a bath and fed twice a day.

Other work of the organization included placing drinking troughs for horses on the streets of Manhattan. In 1910, Kibbe purchased an automobile to transfer animal guests to their country home and transport food. Kibbe was president of Bideawee.

=== Advocacy for horses ===
In 1917, Kibbe collaborated with agents from the American Society for the Prevention of Cruelty to Animals (ASPCA) to save old horses from a farm on Staten Island. However, veterinarians from the ASPCA suggested that the horses were too advanced in years or could no longer be considered fit for any employment and would have to be shot. This angered Kibbe who commented "You are not going to shoot all those horses!... Why, several of them are still as spry as they can be!". After a conference the ASPCA announced that seven of the old horses would have to be shot whilst the rest could live out their lives.

In 1940, Kibbe was instrumental in obtaining passage of Federal legislation which permitted humane organizations in the United States to offer care for any horses which would have been destroyed.

=== Personal life and death ===
Kibbe's parents Cornelia D'Auby Rasor and Paul Edwin Rasor were involved in helping Bideawee. She married Harry Ulysses Kibbe in 1901. Kibbe died from complications sustained from a leg fracture on September 15, 1943. Her funeral was held at the Universal Chapel on Lexington Avenue. Her daughter Mrs. Richard Riddell was president of Bideawee.

== Legacy ==
Bideawee has established The Flora Kibbe Society, a planned giving society named for Kibbe, for donors who include the organization in their estate plans.
