= Rescue Row =

- Neighborhood of San Francisco
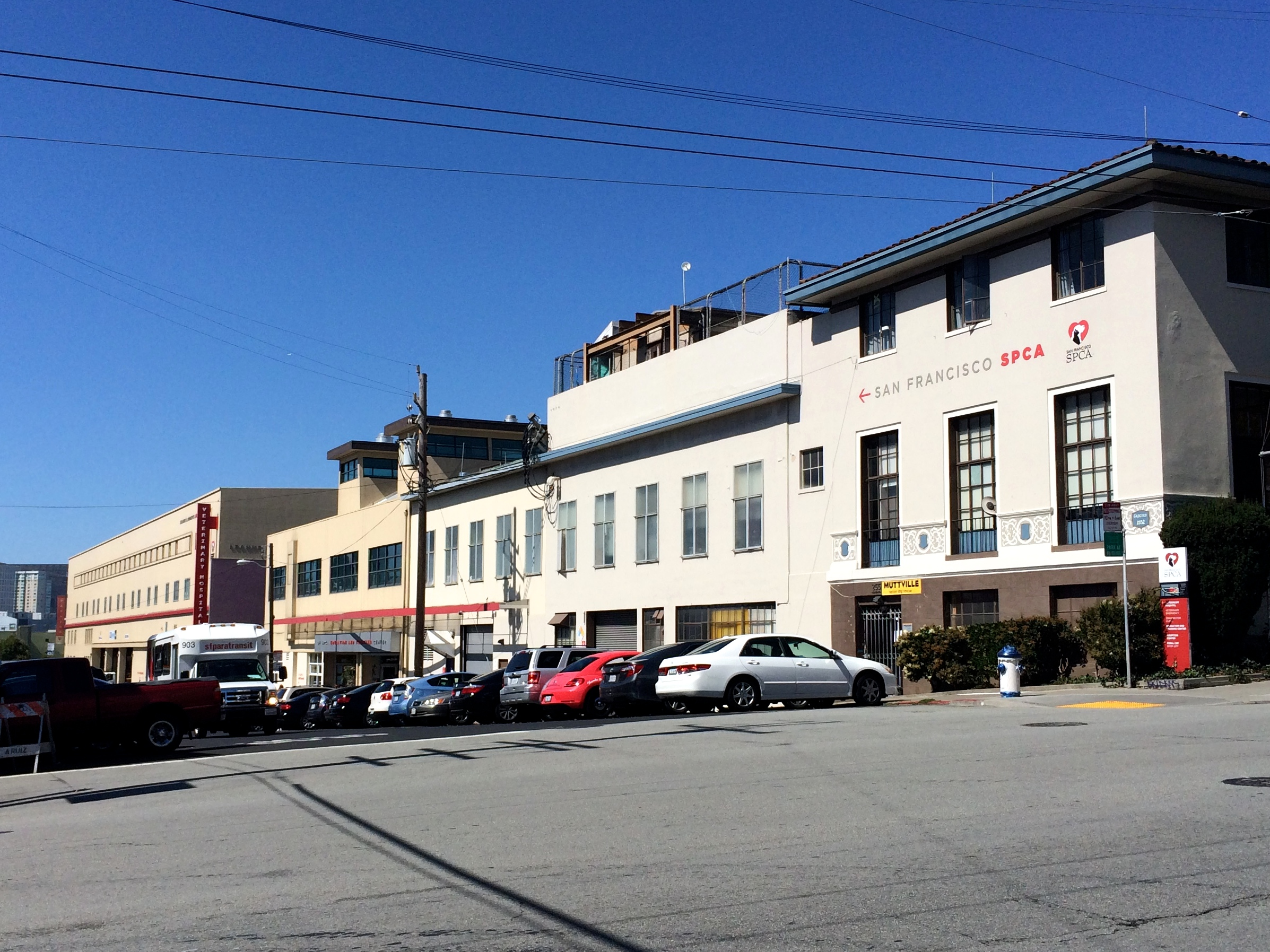

- Location within Central San Francisco
- Coordinates: 37.766095°N 122.412492°W
- Country: United States
- State: California
- City: San Francisco
- Postal code: 94103

Rescue Row is a city block in the Mission District of San Francisco, California known for containing several of San Francisco's animal rescue & pet adoption organizations.

== Location ==
Rescue Row is a one city block long section of Alabama Street running south from 15th Street to 16th Street. It is parallel to and in between Harrison Street and Florida Street. It is roughly between Mission District and the Potrero Hill.

== History ==
In 1868, banker James Sloan Hutchinson founded the San Francisco SPCA on the city block that would become Rescue Row. Other animal welfare organizations later followed suit.

In May 2014, the city of San Francisco officially renamed and inaugurated the city block as "Rescue Row".

At the time of its inauguration, Rescue Row's residing organizations and their respective addresses were:

- San Francisco Animal Care & Control, 1200 15th St.
- San Francisco SPCA, 201 Alabama St.
- Muttville Senior Dog Rescue, 255 Alabama St. (First and Second Floors)
- Northern California Family Dog Rescue, 255 Alabama St. (Third and Fourth Floors)

== Events ==
On May 31, 2014, Rescue Row held a ribbon cutting ceremony, hosting animal lovers and potential adopters. During that weekend, adoption fees were waived for all animals. The co-president of the San Francisco SPCA, Dr. Jennifer Scarlett, was quoted as saying, “When people think of pet adoption in San Francisco, we want Rescue Row to be the first destination that comes to mind.”
