= Abandoned pets =

Abandoned companion animals

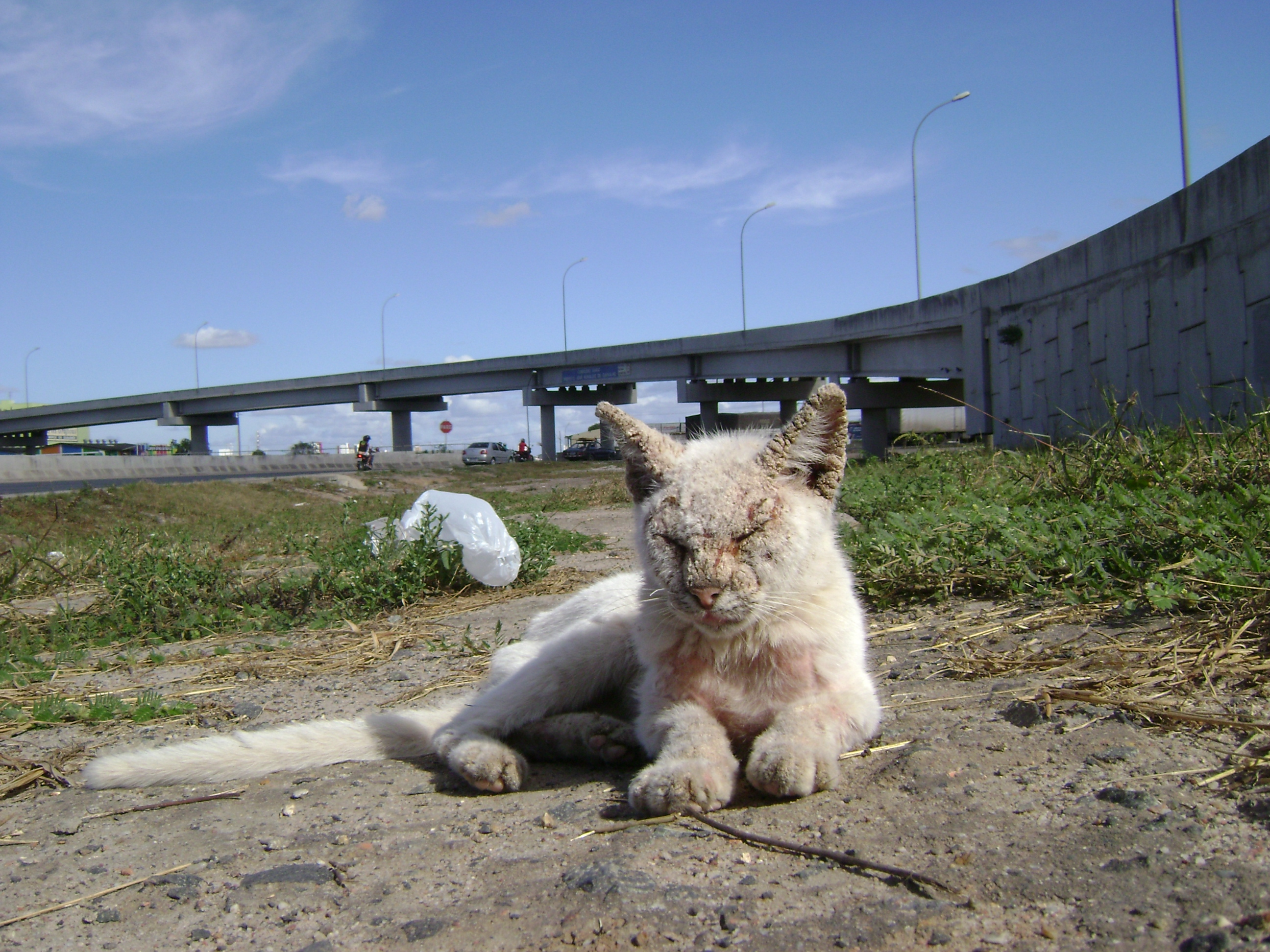
A blind cat that was abandoned next to a highway.

Abandoned pets are companion animals that are either inadvertently or deliberately abandoned by their owners, by either dumping the animals on the streets, leaving them alone in a vacant property, or relinquishing them at an animal shelter.

== Regulations ==
Animal welfare laws in many states of the United States make it a crime to abandon a pet. The UK passed the Abandonment of Animals Act 1960 which describes the offence of cruelty as "If any person being the owner or having charge or control of any animal shall without reasonable cause or excuse abandon it, whether permanently or not, in circumstances likely to cause the animal any unnecessary suffering, or cause or procure or, being the owner, permit it to be so abandoned."

== Consequences and trend ==
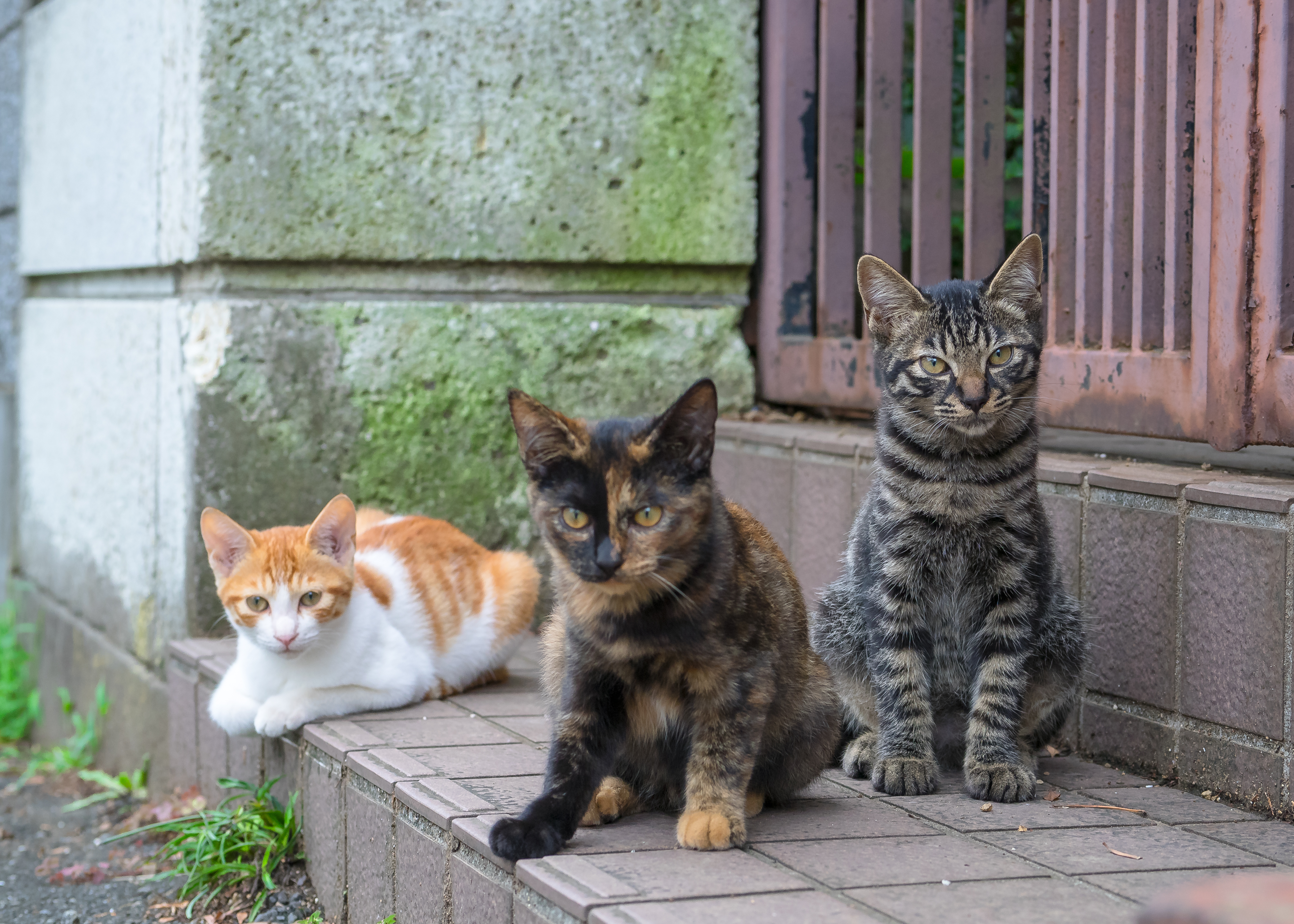
Feral cats

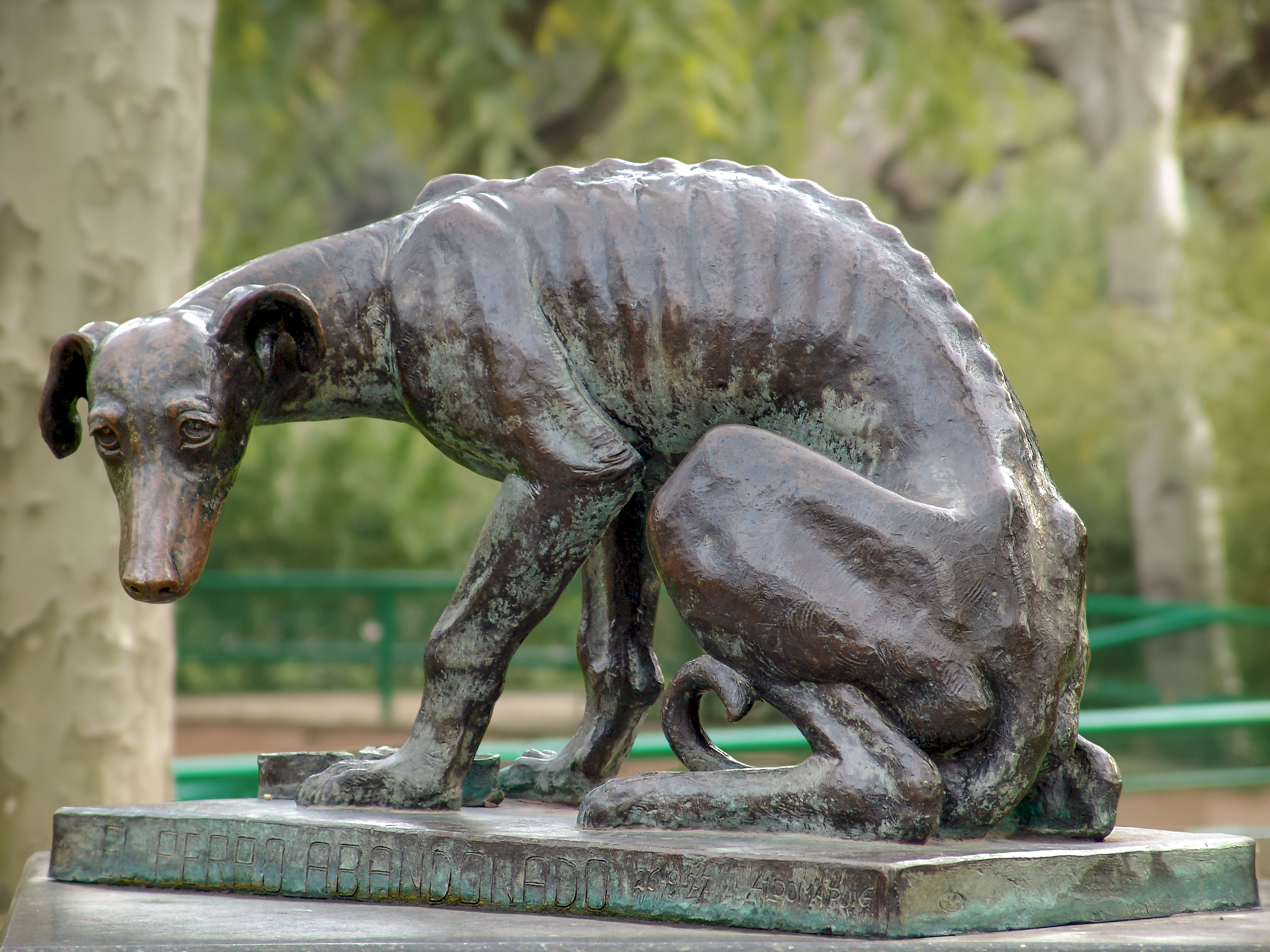
El gos abandonat (The abandoned dog), a monument in the Parc de la Ciutadella, Barcelona, Spain, which is dedicated to abandoned animals.

Often, when abandoned, pets are forced to fend for themselves and become stray or feral. Feral cats are said to outnumber feral dogs and can become challenging to handle and socialize enough to be re-introduced to a new human owner. In general, only some newly abandoned cats and very young feral kittens can be tamed. There is a necessity to investigate interventions to prevent companion-animal relinquishment.

Stray animals increase potential exposure to zoonotic diseases like rabies. Cat bites or scratches involving stray or feral animals are eight times more common than dog bites. The impacts of dog and cat predation on wildlife can also be significant.

Some pets relinquished to an animal shelter will be euthanized due to a lack of space or financial resources. Millions of companion animals enter animal shelters every year in the United States. However, the number of dogs and cats euthanized in US shelters declined from approximately 2.6 million in 2011 to 1.5 million in 2018. This decline can be partially explained by an increase in the percentage of animals adopted, and an increase in the number of stray animals successfully returned to their owners. Studies show that the majority of people who relinquish an animal also report being emotionally attached to the animal. It has been reported that when forced to abandon their animals in an evacuation, people suffer mental issues such as grief, depression, and post-traumatic stress disorder. Recognizing the importance of pets to their owners and their role in public health is an essential first step in improving a public health problem that has been seen repeatedly in the past and is unlikely to change in the future.

Pet abandonment increased during the 2008 financial crisis. In early 2009, the ASPCA published advice for people facing foreclosure and the loss of their pets, recommending finding a foster or adoption situation for your pet, being aware of rental property rules for pets, and checking with animal shelters and animal rescue groups.

== See also ==
- Estray
- Overpopulation in companion animals
- Spaying and neutering
