= Richard Avanzino =

American animal rights campaigner

Richard Avanzino is an American animal rights campaigner and activist. Avanzino is known for being one of the originators of the "no-kill shelter" movement.

== Background ==
In 1980, Avanzino came to national attention for his work campaigning for the life of Sido, a dog facing euthanasia according to the wishes of her owner's will. At the time, Avanzino led the San Francisco Society for the Prevention of Cruelty to Animals (SFSPCA). Avanzino's experience advocating for Sido's life and his work at the SFSPCA furthered the development of the concept of a "no kill" animal shelter, setting an example for other shelters to follow.

On April 1, 1994, Avanzino and the SFSPCA announced the Adoption Pact, which guaranteed a home or lifetime care to any healthy dog or cat that came through the doors of the organization. The SFSPCA became one of the first shelters to designate themselves a "no kill" organization. The concept of an animal shelter focused on adoption of animals was a new development at the time. Avanzino's advocacy for a "no kill nation" has been called both controversial and revolutionary. In addition to his work furthering the no kill shelter movement, at the SFSPCA Avanzino worked on initiatives related to stopping dog fighting, and using dogs for animal-assisted therapy.

Avanzino served as president of the San Francisco SPCA for 23 years. In 1998, Avanzino left the SPCA to become the founding president of Maddie's Fund, a dog and cat charity. At Maddie's Fund, Avanzino broadened the no kill movement beyond California. In 2015, Avanzino retired as the head of Maddie's Fund.

== See also ==
- Henry Bergh
