= Sato Project =

American non-profit animal rescue organization

- Founded: 2011; 15 years ago
- Founder: Christina Beckles
- Type: 501(c)(3)
- Purpose: Animal welfare
- Location: 130 Water Street, Brooklyn, NY 11201
- Website: Official website

The Sato Project is an animal rescue and protection organization founded in 2011 by British-born Christina Beckles. It works to rescue abused and abandoned dogs in Puerto Rico, educating the public and advocating for abused and abandoned dogs. "Sato" is the Spanish word used in Puerto Rico and Cuba for referring to stray dogs or cats. Many of the project's missions have involved airlifting dogs before and after natural disasters, including Hurricane Maria in 2017 and the earthquakes that struck Puerto Rico in 2019 and 2020. "Spayathon" is a spaying and neutering program, attended by Sato Project and other animal rights organizations in Puerto Rico, which has had an impact on the stray dog population.

== Background ==
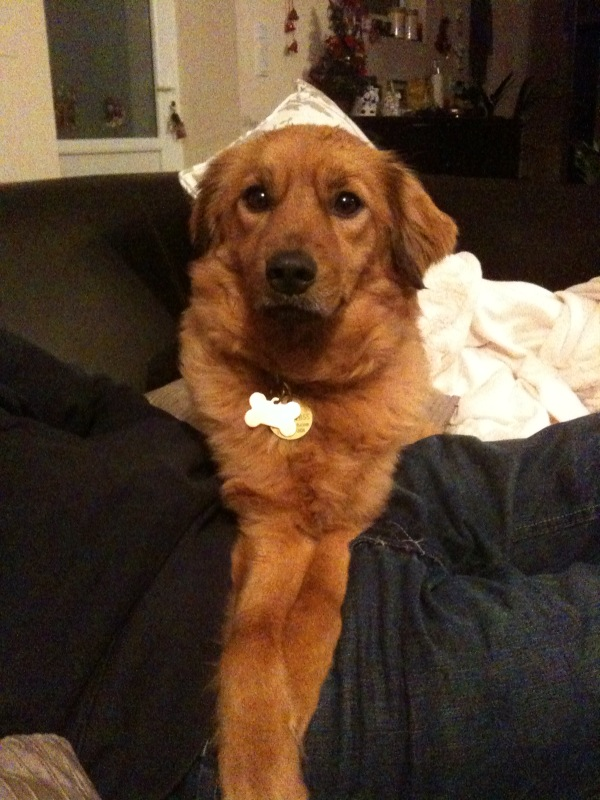
A 'sato' dog living in France

A sato is a mongrel (i.e., mixed breed) dog, often without a home, in Puerto Rico. Sato is also how many organizations in Puerto Rico and in the continental U.S. refer to the Puerto Rican dogs when aiming to find them owners. The Sato Project founded by Christina Beckles is named after them. While strays come in a variety of shapes and sizes, sato dogs are often small to medium-sized, with large ears and stubby legs. Animal rights groups in and outside of Puerto Rico say they are frequently the target of abuse and neglect. In 2012, there were an estimated 100,000 satos in Puerto Rico. While there are initiatives for adopting satos from shelters and as many as 1400 dogs were adopted in 2018, there were still an estimated 300,000 homeless satos in the same year in PR. By 2021, The New Yorker magazine was claiming the population as 500,000 again.

== Operations ==
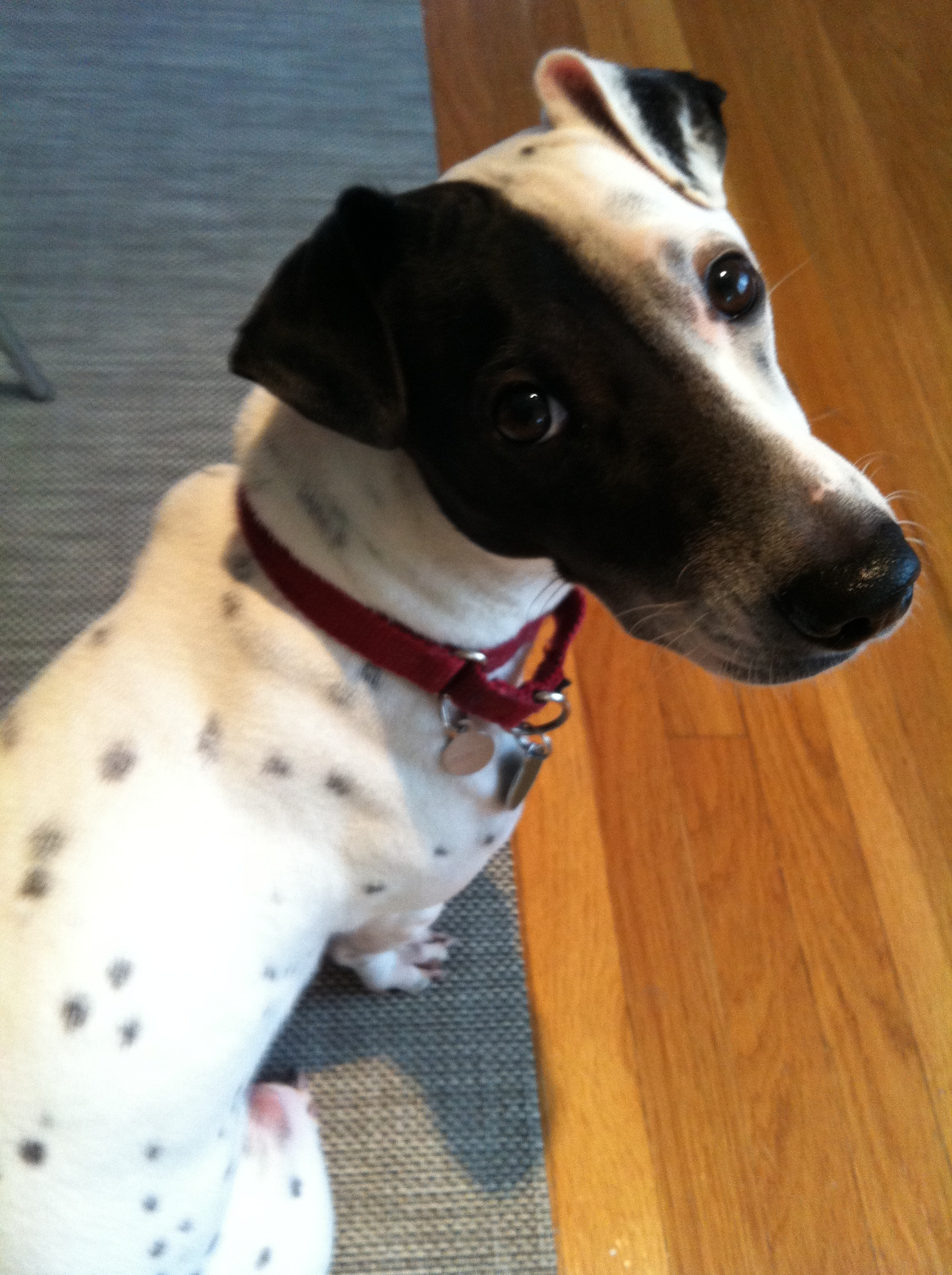
Sato adopted by someone in Massachusetts, US

The Sato Project is composed of two teams: one operating in Puerto Rico and another operating in the mainland United States. These teams work together to ship the dogs from Puerto Rico to the U.S. mainland.

The process of helping these animals begins with them being logged and identified on the beach. Once logged, the Beach Coordinator will check on these dogs daily and give them food and medicine until space opens up in the Sato Project shelter. Once a dog is taken to the shelter, it receives a full check-up. A veterinarian determines what, if any, medications or care is required for that animal to return to full health. In addition to a check-up, the dogs are spayed/neutered and vaccinated. When the dog is finally well enough to travel, volunteers in Puerto Rico help prepare it to fly to either JFK in New York or Newark Airport in New Jersey. Upon arriving, the dogs are received by another team of volunteers who transport them to the project's adoption team. The latter works to find every dog a home and will even take a dog back if an adoption fails, but less than 0.1% of adopted satos are returned. The scale is 300-350 dogs per year but can increase significantly when there is a natural disaster in Puerto Rico.

== History ==
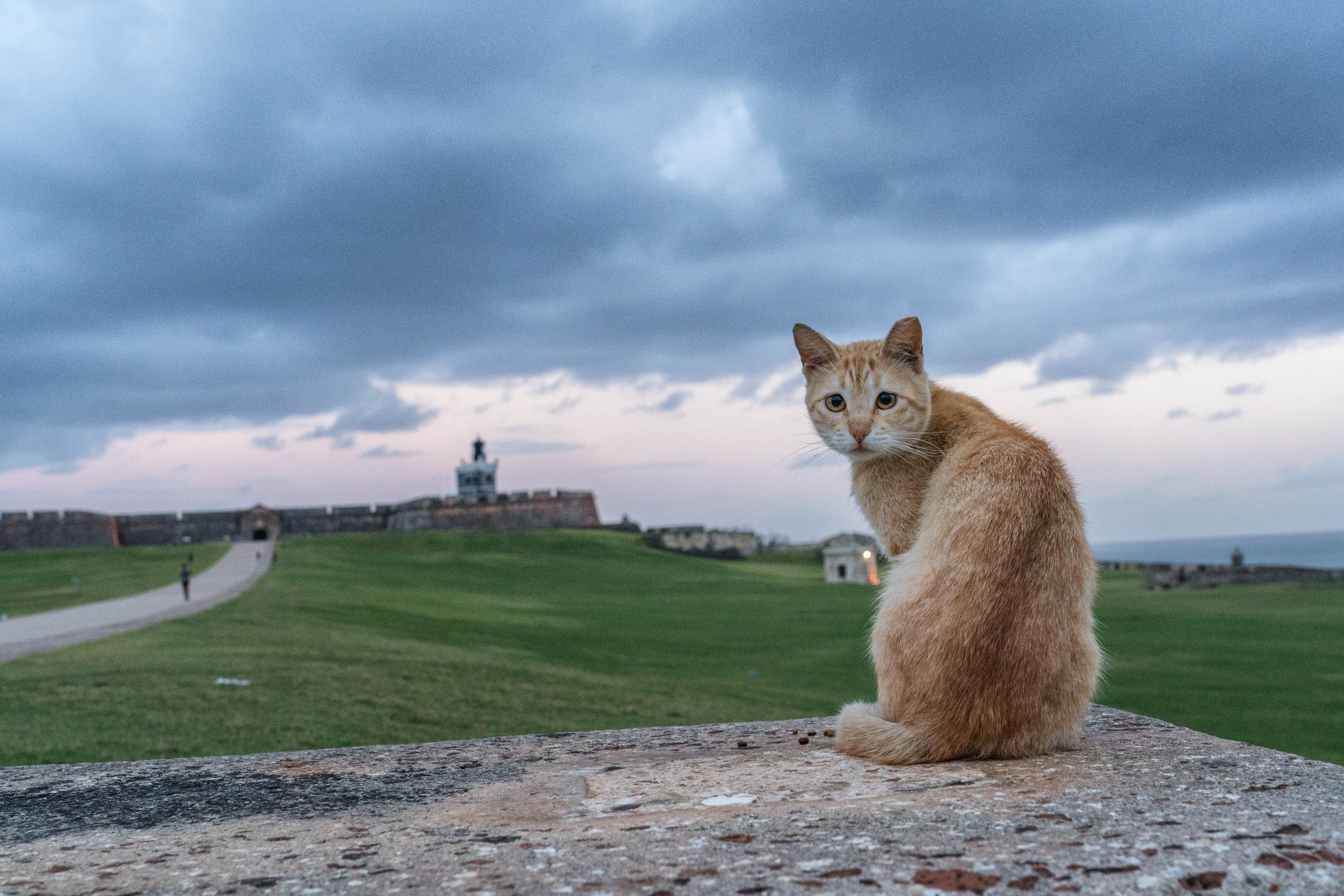
A stray cat with El Morro in the background - In 2018, the University of Puerto Rico estimated there were a million stray cats in PR.

British-born Christina Beckles, who is a former Golden Gloves boxer, founded the project in 2011 in Puerto Rico but moved Sato Project's headquarters to Brooklyn, New York. In 2012, Beckles said she was allergic to dogs and required weekly injections but felt that saving Puerto Rico's satos was her passion. Working with volunteers, Beckles began the main task with a small operation called "Operation Paws", to fly a number of dogs that had already been cared for, from Puerto Rico to the U.S. where they could be put up for adoption.

In 2015, Beckles continued the work to rescue dogs from "Dead Dog Beach", a beach in Yabucoa which had become a dumping ground for unwanted pets and stray dogs for years. By late 2017, with the help of the American Humane Society, and Wings of Rescue, the Sato Project had flown 2,000 dogs from the beach in Yabucoa to locations in the U.S.

Before and after Hurricane Maria struck the island of Puerto Rico in September 2017, Beckles evacuated many dogs saving them from certain death. Beckles worked to reunite pets with their owners, residents who had left Puerto Rico after the hurricane. Volunteer pilots and "Wings of Rescue" helped the organization with the efforts to evacuate the animals.

In the spring of 2018, around the same time that the University of Puerto Rico had taken its first estimated census of stray animals in Puerto Rico (finding there were 300,000 satos and a million stray cats), Sato Project was part of a coalition that launched Puerto Rico's first "spayathon", a free-of-charge, spaying and neutering event to help curb the island's sato (dog and cat) overpopulation. The spayathon also microchipped the animals.

Sato Project pushed to have a gate put up to curtail the dumping of dogs on "Dead Dog Beach". More than 100,000 dogs have been spayed or neutered in subsequent "spayathons".

In 2020, the organization continued helping by evacuating dogs that had been satos affected by the 2019–2020 Puerto Rico earthquakes. The rescue animals were flown and taken to shelters in Philadelphia, New Jersey and Florida.

The project's founder would like to see the sato become Puerto Rico's national dog and advocates for their adoption by people living in the United States and some American celebrities have adopted a sato.

Puppies rescued by the Sato Project have been featured in Puppy Bowl, a puppy "parody of the U.S. Super Bowl".

== Gallery ==
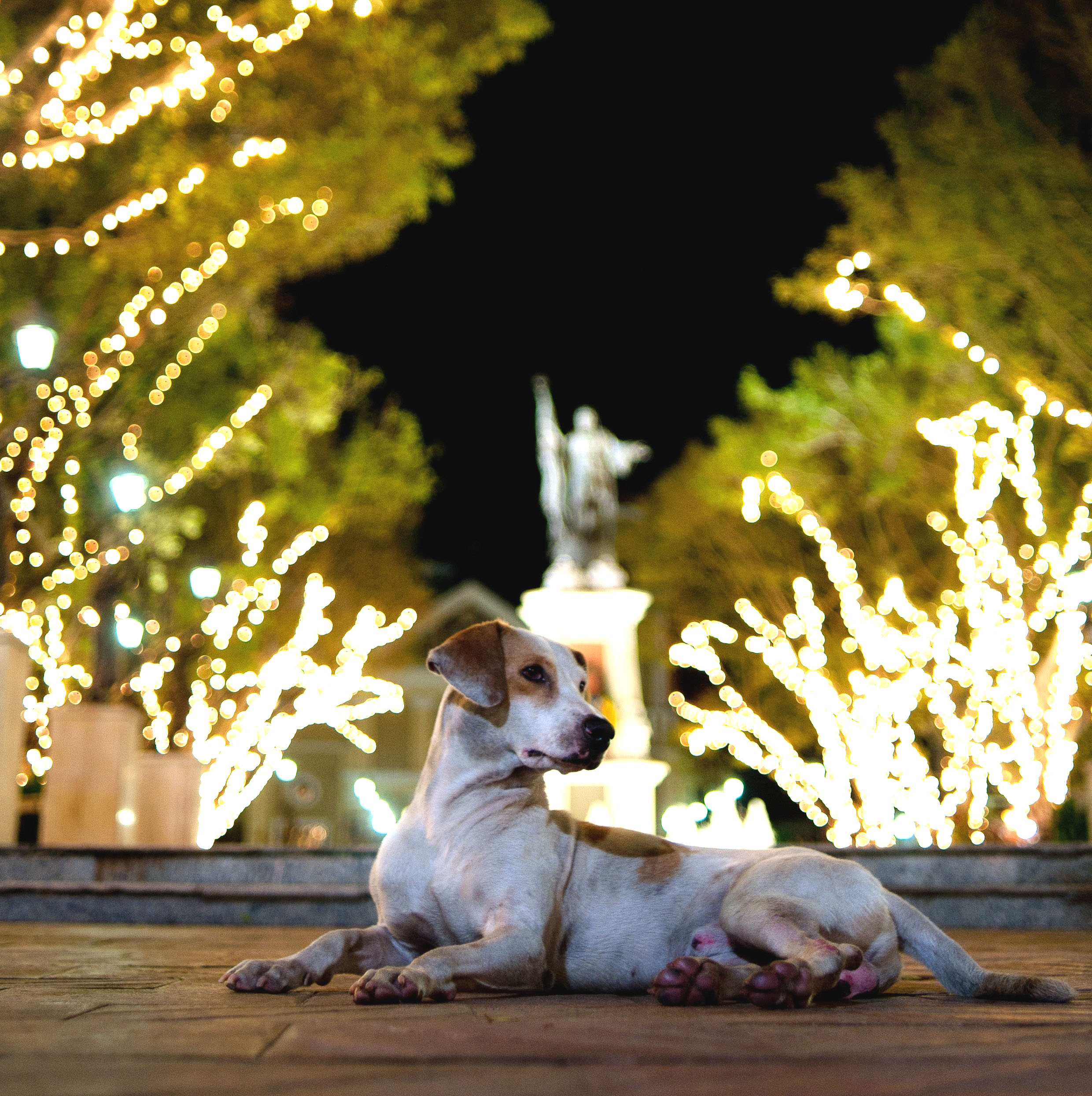
Sato in the Mayagüez townsquare

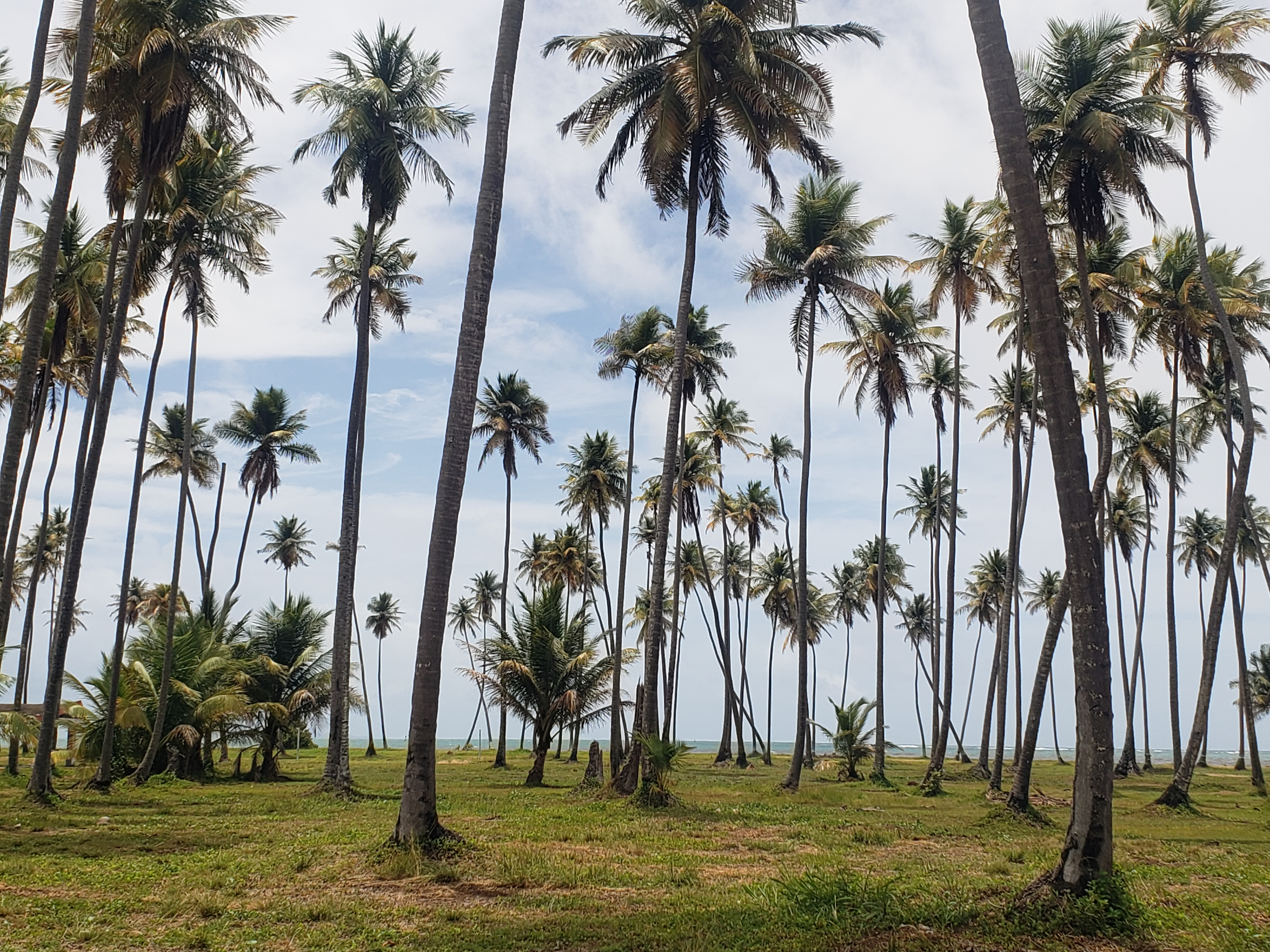
Playa Lucia

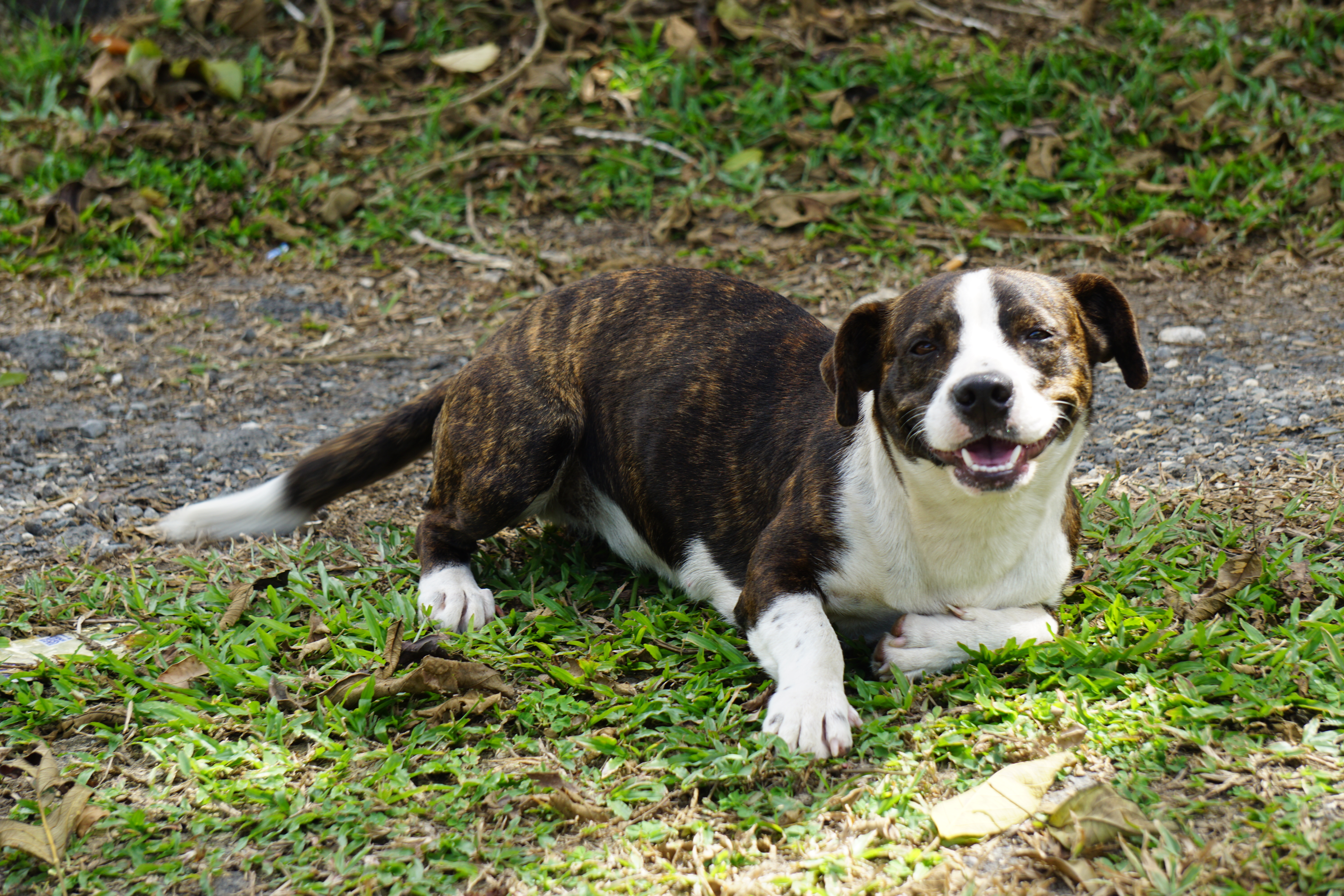
A stray dog in Arecibo, Puerto Rico

== See also ==
- Animal rights
- Free-ranging urban dog
