= Chien Chih-cheng =

Taiwanese veterinarian and animal welfare worker

Chien Chih-cheng (Chinese: 簡稚澄; pinyin: Jiǎn Zhìchéng) (d. 12 May 2016) was a Taiwanese veterinarian, animal welfare worker and director of an animal shelter. Her suicide caused outrage across Taiwan over the inadequate legislation regarding animal euthanasia, as well as the issue of cyberbullying by netizens and the press.

== Background ==
Chien graduated from the National Taiwan University as a veterinarian, achieving the highest score in Taiwan's Tekao (特考) civil service examination. She worked as the director of an animal shelter in Xinwu District. Chien appeared in a TV show which revealed that she had euthanized over 700 stray dogs in one year. This led to many animal activists attacking her, and the Taiwanese media and netizens branded her as a 'female butcher' (女屠夫) and 'female executioner' (女劊子手). At the time, Taiwan struggled with animal abandonment and overcrowding in its shelters. In 2015, Taiwan euthanized 10,900 shelter animals, and nearly 9,000 others died due to other causes. That year, 550,000 animals were adopted.

=== Death ===
On 5 May 2016, Chien injected herself with the same drug she used to euthanize stray dogs, eventually dying on the 12th. She was 32. Chien was said to have left a note describing how much she loved animals and that she had taken her own life in an effort to communicate that "all lives are equal" and urge the government to do more to help abandoned animals. Her death highlighted the immense stress animal welfare workers were under. It also led to widespread condemnation of the netizens and the media over the portrayal of Chien.

=== Legacy ===
One year after Chien's suicide, changes to Taiwan's Animal Protection Act (動物保護法), came into force, making it illegal to euthanize stray animals. The law was passed a year before Chien's suicide. The Taiwanese government additionally offered greater psychological support to shelter workers.
