= Project Bay Cat =

Trap-neuter-return initiative for cats

Project Bay Cat is a trap-neuter-return initiative for community cats in Northern California.

== Summary ==
Project Bay Cat was founded in 2004 to address concerns about a large group of community cats (free-roaming cats not belonging to individuals) living along a popular recreation trail in Northern California.

Volunteers initiated a Trap-Neuter-Return (TNR) program to humanely stop the growth of the cat population and reduce its size over time through natural attrition. In addition to TNR efforts, volunteers also rescued kittens and friendly adult cats to find them homes. Feeding stations were built and were placed - with the help of local experts - away from wildlife habitats, and a volunteer-based feeding program was begun to provide daily care for the remaining cats. In 2014, the cat population had been reduced by 65% due to spay/neuter and adoption efforts, and natural attrition.

The project has been identified as a successful example of TNR.

== Participants ==
The project is jointly supported by the city in which Project Bay Cat resides, residents, volunteers and Homeless Cat Network. There are approximately 40 volunteers, and one veterinary hospital that provide ongoing care for the cats of Project Bay Cat.

== Methods ==
The project uses trap-neuter-return, adoption efforts, public education, and anti-abandonment programs. Kittens are placed in foster homes, while friendly adult cats are socialized by volunteers. Signs and brochures about the program are placed at locations along the trail where cats are most likely to be viewed, with reminders that it is illegal to abandon cats.

Ten wooden feeding stations were set up, built in a way to deter skunks and raccoons. Volunteers visit daily to provide food, water, and monitor the cats for veterinary needs. Members of the public are asked not to feed the cats, as it could interfere with trapping efforts.

== Population ==
There were 175 cats and kittens at the location at the start of Project Bay Cat, and their numbers were increasing. One feral cat, a tuxedo cat named Miss Bibs, had 36 kittens in two years before she was humanely trapped and spayed.

After two years, Project members reported that 92% of the cats had been spayed or neutered, exceeding initial goals. Over 60 kittens and friendly adult cats had been adopted. The population along the trail had declined by 30% to 129 cats.

By 2007, the project's third year, the population had declined by 40%.

By October 2014, the organization reported that 108 cats had been adopted to date, and the colony size had declined by 65%.

In February 2019, the organization stated that there were 7 cats left living on the trail, with the population declined by 95%.

== Notable rescues ==
- Babe - a female black cat with medium-length hair, Babe developed a severe respiratory infection early in 2014. Volunteers offered to foster her and give her 24-hour medical care. Babe recovered, grew more friendly with the family, and in September 2014, her foster family adopted her.
- Target - a female tabby cat, Target was so fearful of people in 2013 that she could only be glimpsed "as she made stealthy, covert trips to the food bowl." By February 2014, she often intercepted volunteers on their way to the feeding station to be petted. In October 2014, Target was adopted.
- TimmyBob - a male tabby cat, TimmyBob had surgery for an abscessed cheek, followed by a surgery to remove a tooth. He was then returned to the colony, where he was warmly received by the other cats.

== Art ==
Local photographer Robert Barbutti took a number of candid portraits of the cats. An art show featuring the photographs was presented in 2005, with proceeds from sales benefiting Project Bay Cat.
