= Playa Lucia =

Beach in Yabucoa, Puerto Rico

Coordinates: 18.042°N 65.834°W

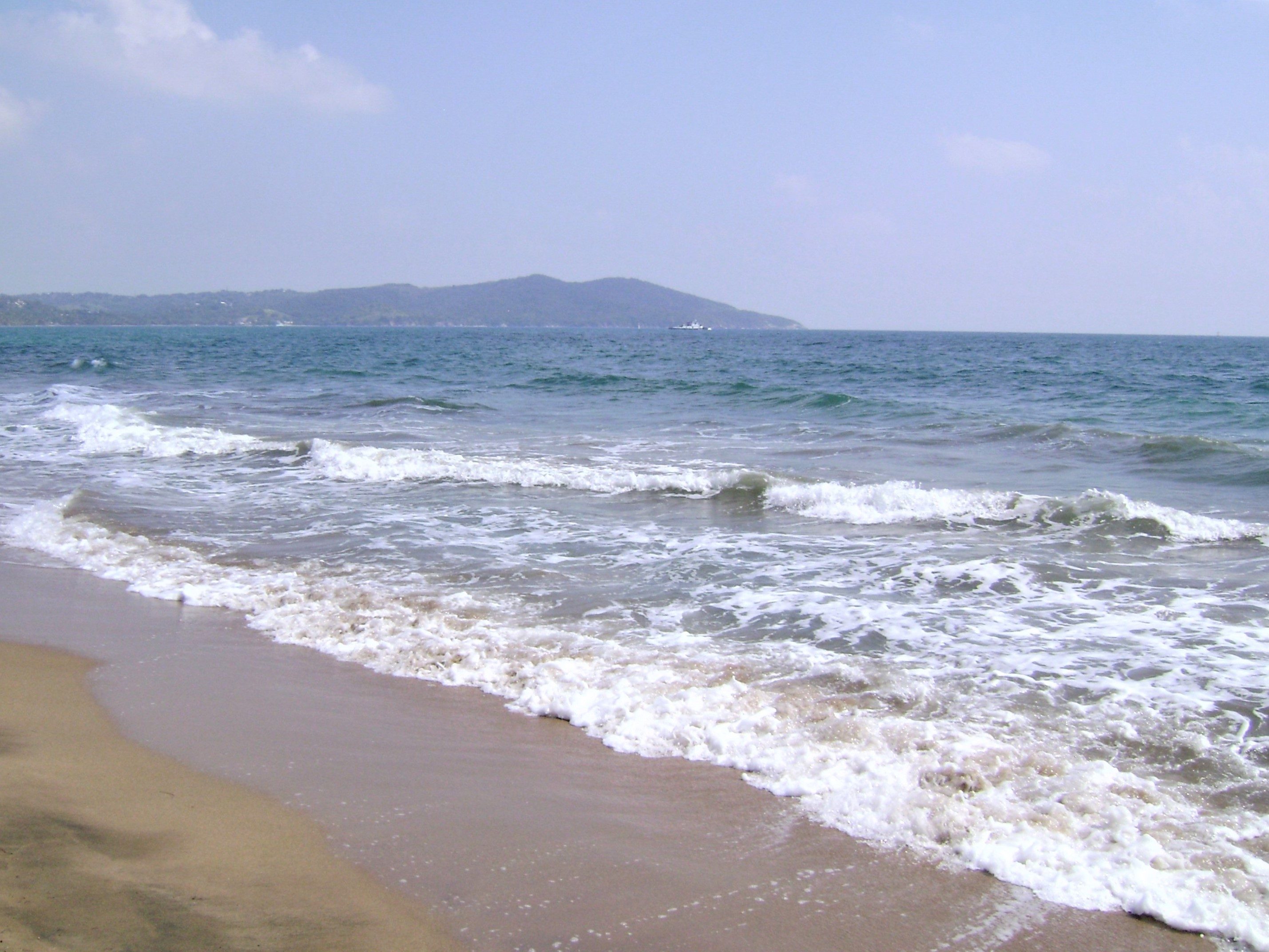
Playa Lucia in 2010

Playa Lucia is a beach in the municipality of Yabucoa on the southeastern coast of Puerto Rico. The beach has also been referred to in English-language media as Dead Dog Beach because of the number of abandoned dogs found in the area.

Animal rescuers have worked at the beach since at least the 2000s. Their activities have included feeding and treating abandoned animals, arranging adoptions, and transporting rescued dogs to the mainland United States. The Sato Project, founded by Chrissy Beckles, has been particularly associated with rescue efforts at Playa Lucia.

== Geography ==
Playa Lucia is located in Yabucoa on Puerto Rico's southeastern coast. Yabucoa lies between the Caribbean Sea and mountainous terrain associated with the San Lorenzo Batholith and the Sierra de Cayey. The municipality includes the Yabucoa Valley, an agricultural plain drained by rivers including the Guayanés, Arenas, Limones, and Ingenio River rivers.

== Abandoned animals ==
Playa Lucia became known for the presence of abandoned dogs and cats. News reports described dogs living around the beach and nearby abandoned recreational facilities, with rescuers providing food and medical treatment and attempting to arrange adoptions.

Stephen McGarva, who moved to Puerto Rico in 2005, became involved in caring for dogs at Playa Lucia after encountering abandoned animals there. He fed dogs and treated their wounds before later publicizing the situation in the United States.

Puerto Rico more broadly has experienced a longstanding problem with abandoned and stray animals. Economic difficulties and limited access to affordable veterinary services have been cited as contributing factors. Animal-welfare organizations have also organized large-scale sterilization programs in Puerto Rico.

== Rescue efforts ==
=== Sato Project ===
The Sato Project is an animal-rescue organization founded by Chrissy Beckles. The organization has rescued dogs from Playa Lucia and arranged veterinary treatment and transportation to the mainland United States for adoption.

By 2014, a gate had been installed to restrict vehicle access to the beach in an effort to discourage the abandonment of animals. The Sato Project subsequently continued monitoring the area for abandoned dogs.

The organization has also participated in sterilization programs intended to reduce Puerto Rico's population of stray and abandoned animals.

=== Other animal-welfare efforts ===
Animal-welfare organizations elsewhere in Puerto Rico have operated rescue, adoption, and sterilization programs. The Animal Rescue Foundation of Rincón, established in 1997, has provided rescue, adoption, and spaying and neutering services in Rincón.

Following Hurricane Maria, organizations from Puerto Rico and the mainland United States participated in animal-relief and sterilization programs. Veterinarians associated with the Brevard Humane Society and Veterinarios Internacionales Dedicados a Animales Sanos (VIDAS) participated in spay-and-neuter clinics in Puerto Rico.

== See also ==
- Animal welfare in the United States
- Sato (dog)
