= San Francisco Animal Care and Control =

Agency of the municipal government of San Francisco

San Francisco Animal Care and Control (SF ACC) is an agency of the municipal government of San Francisco. San Francisco Animal Care and Control Center is the agency's animal shelter, and the only open-intake facility in the city.

== History ==
The agency was established circa 1989. In 1994 it signed an agreement with the San Francisco SPCA, a nonprofit organization, to transfer animals among one another.

In 2025 Tara Duggan of the San Francisco Chronicle wrote that the relationship between this shelter and the San Francisco SPCA was "increasingly strained"; the latter had previously absorbed many animals from the San Francisco shelter but lately started taking more animals from other California cities and fewer from San Francisco.

== Facility ==
The current animal shelter facility was built as a three-story structure added in the outer shell of a building that was constructed in the 1893 as a facility to power streetcars. This facility opened in spring 2021. It had a cost of $76,000,000. The facility has an exercise area on the roof, a separate rabbit exercise area, and a flush toilet which takes dog feces.
