= Animal shelter =

Place where stray and unwanted animals are housed

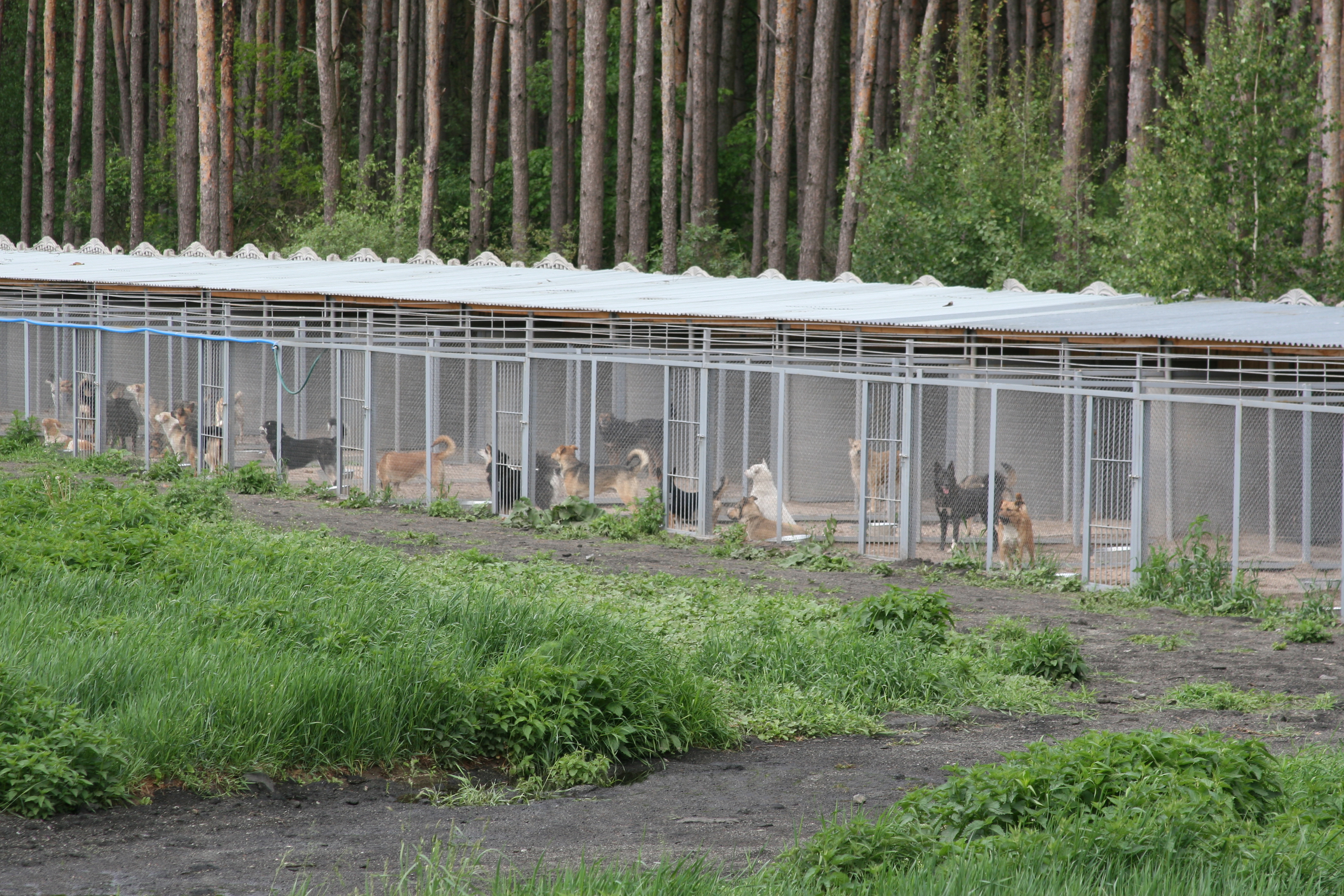
Outdoor kennel runs at a shelter

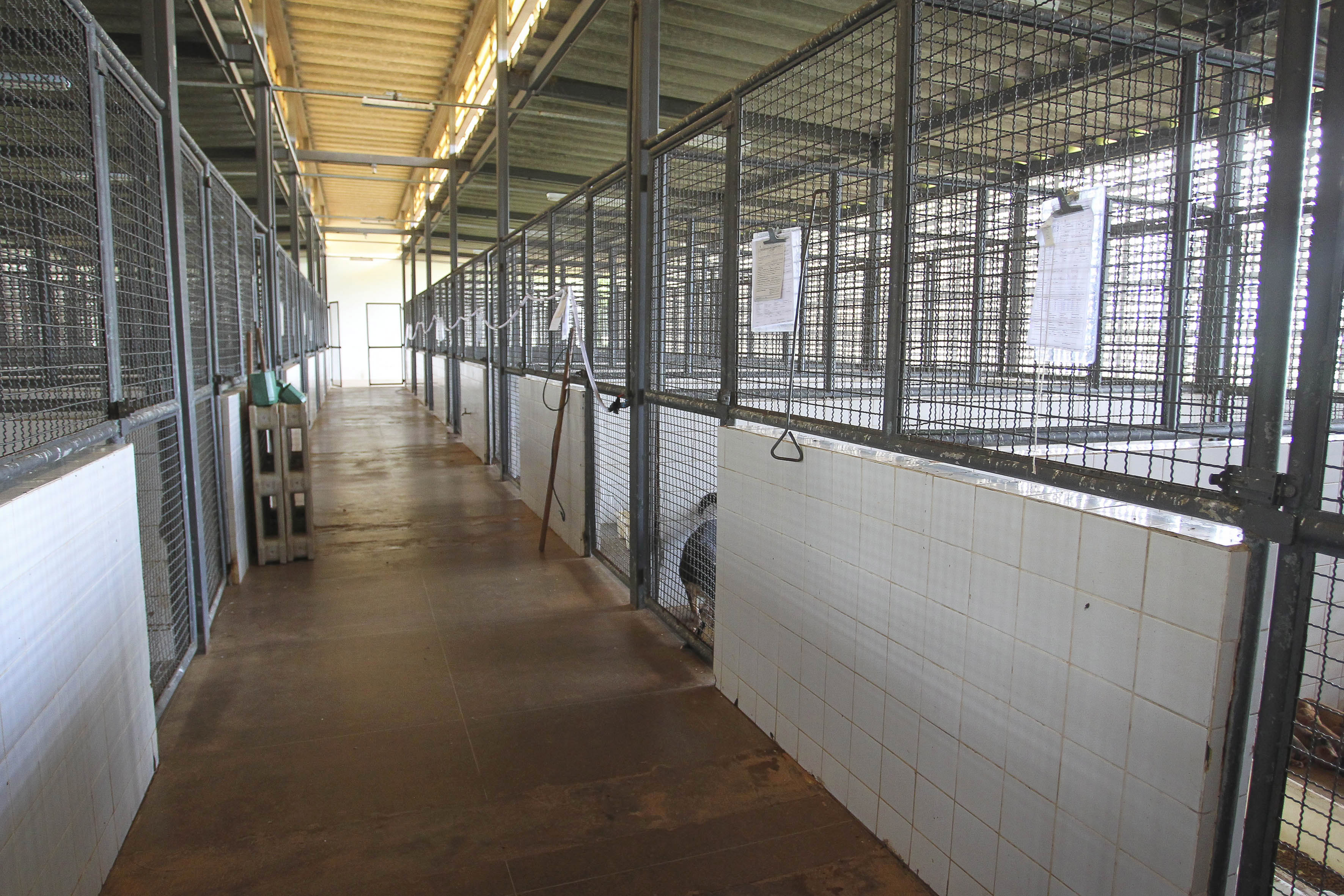
Indoor dog kennels at a shelter

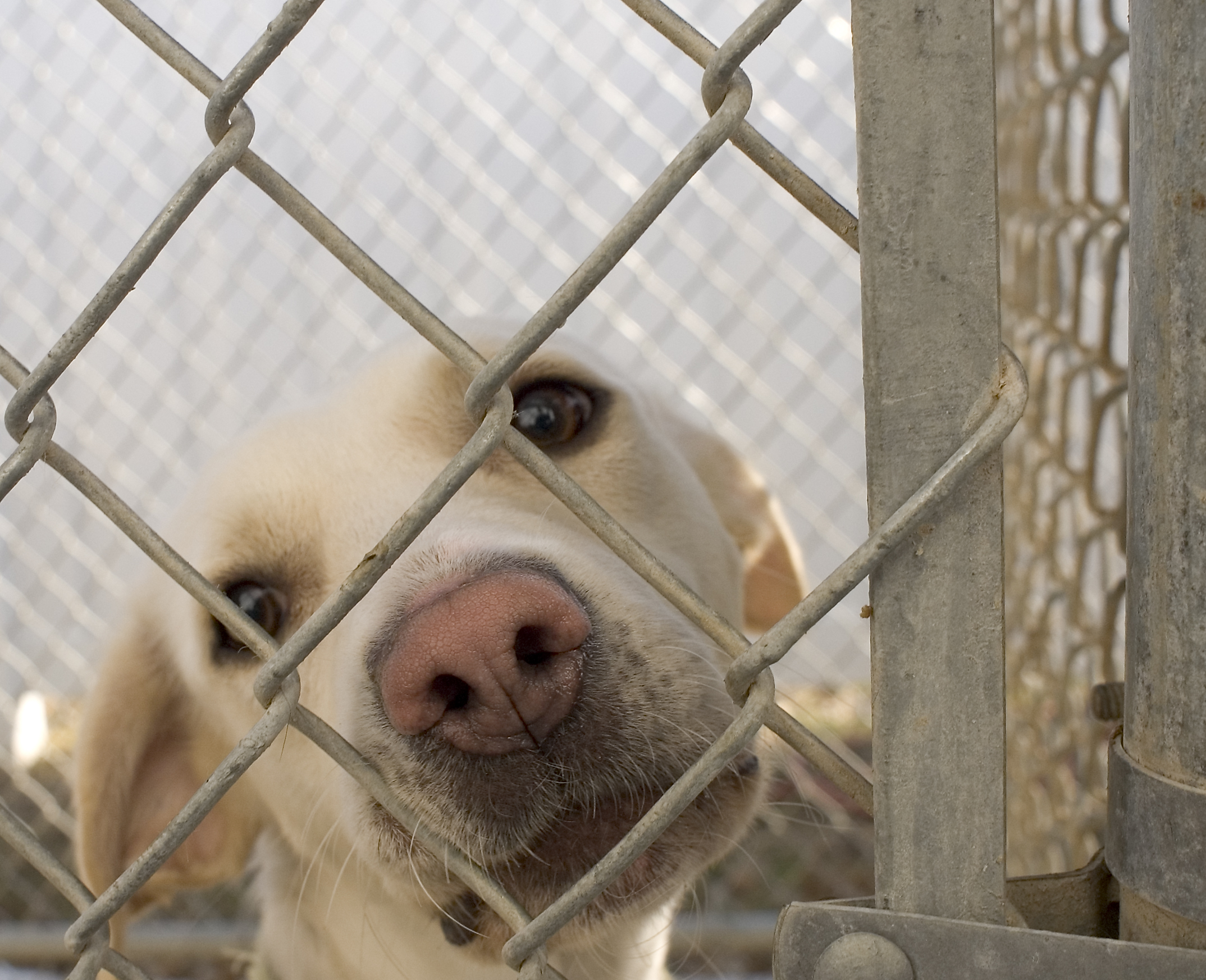
A dog at an animal shelter

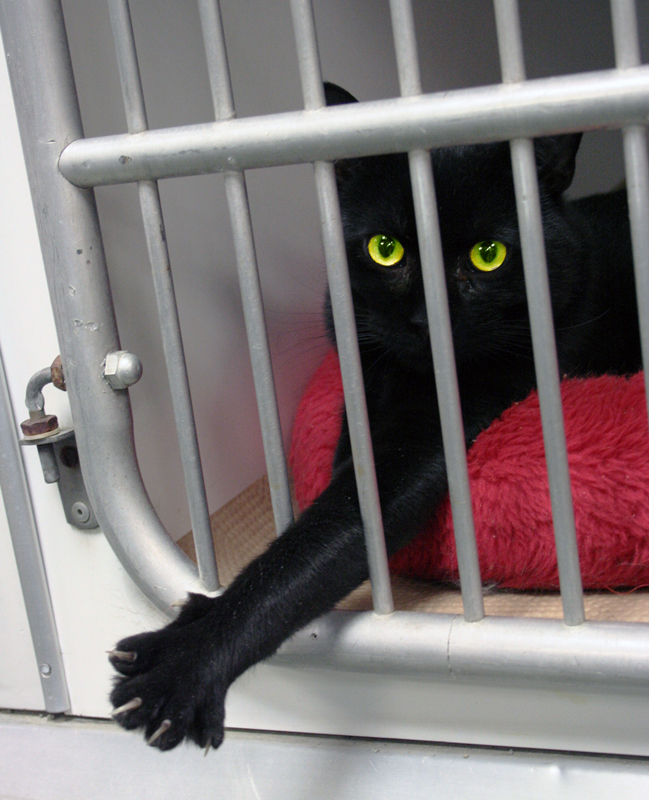
A cat at an animal shelter

An animal shelter or pound is a place where stray, lost, abandoned or surrendered animals – mostly dogs and cats – are housed. The word "pound" has its origins in the animal pounds of agricultural communities, where stray livestock would be penned or impounded until they were claimed by their owners.

While no-kill shelters exist, it is sometimes policy to euthanize animals that are not claimed quickly enough by a previous or new owner. In Europe, of the 30 countries included in a survey, all but six (Austria, the Czech Republic, Germany, Greece, Italy and Poland) permitted euthanizing non-adopted animals.

Although animal shelters provide benefits to dogs and cats, they may also be a stressful environment for them. However, human interaction, including gentle petting and play, has been found to reduce stress and improve the welfare of both dogs and cats. Other forms of enrichment, such as toys and hiding places, have also been found to have similar positive effects.

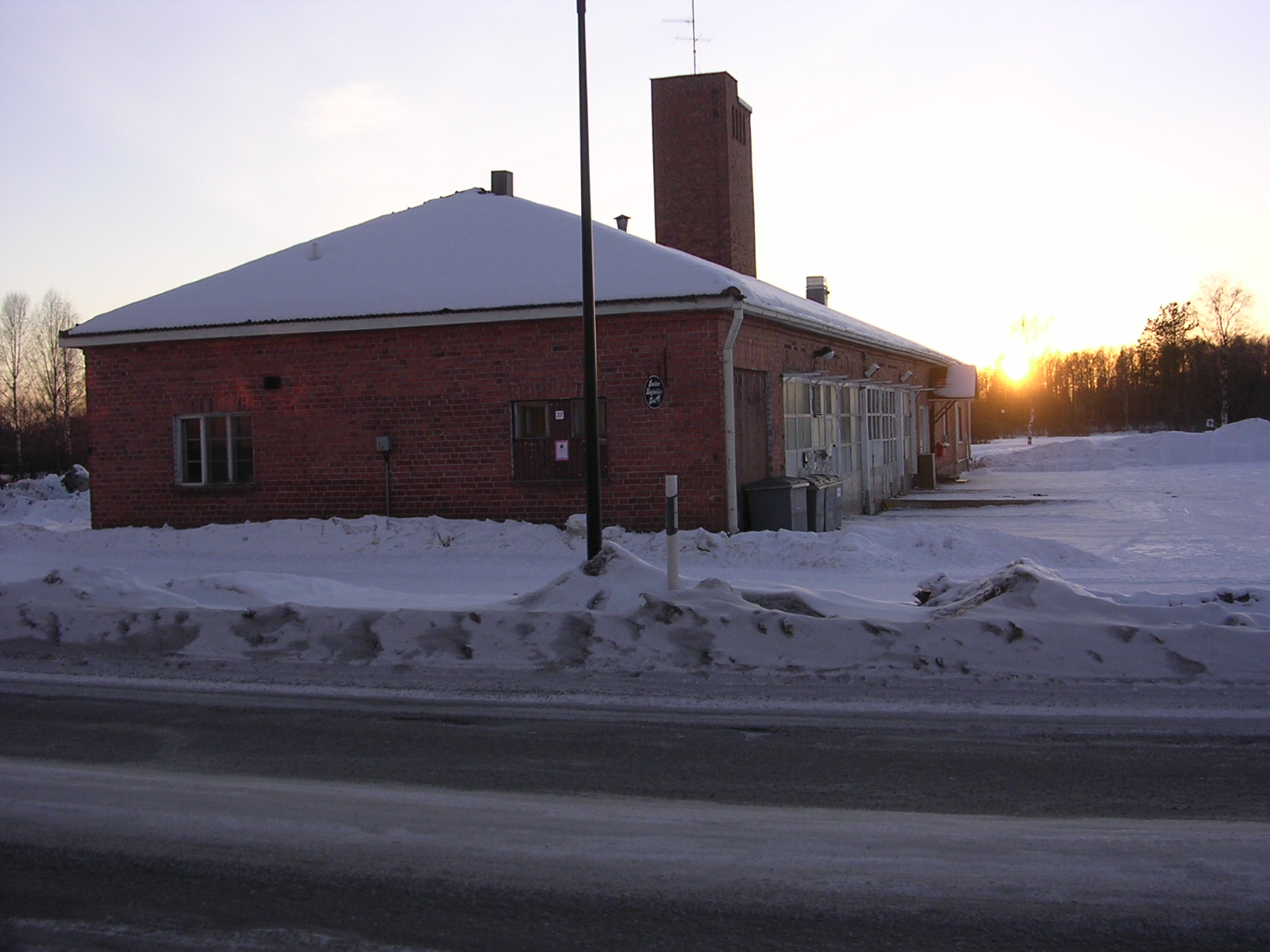
Animal shelter for found animals in Raahe, Finland

== Terminology ==
The shelter industry has terminology for their unique field of work, and though there are no exact standards for consistent definitions, many words have meanings based on their usage.

Animal control has the municipal function of picking up stray dogs and cats, and investigating reports of animal abuse, dog bites or animal attacks. It may also be called animal care and control, and earlier was called the dog catcher or rabies control. Stray, lost or abandoned pets picked up off the streets are usually transported to the local animal shelter, or pound. Uncomplicated stray cases are usually kept for a period of time, called stray hold. After the holding period, an animal is considered forfeited by its owner, and may become available for adoption. Animals involved in attacks or bites are placed in quarantine and are not available for adoption until investigations or legal cases are resolved. Animal control's interest is mainly public safety and rabies control.

Many shelter policies allow individuals to bring in animals to the shelter, often called owner surrender, or relinquishing an animal. An open admission shelter will accept any animal regardless of reason, and is usually a municipal-run shelter or a private shelter with a contract to operate for a municipality. Municipal shelters may limit incoming animals to those from the area in which they serve. A managed admission shelter requires an appointment and will restrict admission of animals to fit their available resources. Limited admission shelters are usually private or non-profit shelters without municipal contracts, and they may limit their intake to only highly-adoptable and healthy animals.

An animal in a shelter has four outcomes: return to owner, adoption, transfer to another shelter or rescue facility, or euthanasia. Return to owner is when a stray animal, that was found and housed at the shelter, is picked up by its owner. Most animal shelters practice adoption, where an animal in their care is given or sold to an individual who will keep it and care for it. Some shelters work with rescue organizations, giving an animal to the rescue rather than adopting it to an individual. Some jurisdictions mandate that shelters cooperate with rescues; some shelters utilize rescues to offload animals with health or behavior problems that they are not equipped to deal with. Many shelters practice some level of euthanasia.

Euthanasia is the act of putting an animal to death. A high kill shelter euthanizes many of the animals they take in; a low kill shelter euthanizes few animals and usually operates programs to increase the number of animals that are released alive. A shelter's live release rate is the measure of how many animals leave a shelter alive compared to the number of animals they have taken in. A no kill shelter practices a very strict high live release rate, such as 90%, 95%, or even 100%. Since there is no standard of measurement, some shelters compare live releases to the number of healthy, adoptable animals, while others compare live releases to every animal they took in – as such, the terms high kill, low kill, and no kill are therefore subjective.

Shelter partners include rescue groups, fosters and sanctuaries. Rescue groups will often pull dogs from shelters, helping to reduce the number of animals at a shelter. A rescue group often specializes in a specific dog breed, or they pull hard-to-adopt animals such as those with health or behavioral issues with the intention of rehabilitating the animal for a future adoption. Many rescues don't have brick and mortar locations but operate out of a home or with foster partners. A foster will temporarily take animals from the shelter to their home to give them special attention or care, such as a newly whelped litter of puppies, or an animal recovering from an illness. An animal sanctuary is an alternative to euthanasia for difficult-to-adopt animals; it is a permanent placement which may include secure kenneling and care by staff experienced in the handling of animals with serious aggression or permanent behavioral problems, or a home for aged animals that will be cared for until their natural death. Adoption and sending to rescue or sanctuary are permanent placements; fostering is a temporary placement.

A retail rescue takes advantage of right-of-first-choice of the free or cheap inventory of animals from shelters to flip shelter-pulled animals under the banner of 'adoption', with little or no retraining or veterinary care in between pulling a dog and selling it. They may also obtain animals cheaply from auctions or puppy mills and command high dollar for their adoptions under the ruse of having 'rescued' the animal. A retail shelter operates like an ordinary animal shelter but with more of the flavor of a pet store than a traditional shelter by selling pet supplies. They may even obtain animals from out of the area to increase their inventory of animals, rather than serving only their geographic service area.

Many shelters routinely spay or neuter all their adoptable animals and vaccinate them for rabies and other routine pet diseases. Shelters often offer rabies clinics or spay-neuter clinics to their local public at discount rates. Some shelters participate in trap–neuter–return programs where stray animals are captured, neutered and vaccinated, then returned to the location they were picked up.

== By country ==
=== Germany ===
Larger cities in Germany have a city shelter (Tierheim) for animals or contract with one of the many non-profit animal organizations in the country, which run their own shelters. Most shelters are populated by dogs, cats, and a variety of small animals like mice, rats, and rabbits. Additionally, there are so-called Gnadenhöfe ("mercy-farms") for larger animals that take cattle or horses from private owners who want to put them down for financial reasons.

The Animal Protection Act prohibits killing of vertebrates without a proper reason. Generally, proper reasons are slaughtering or hunting for food production (cats and dogs are excepted from that), control of infectious diseases, painless killing "if continued life would imply uncurable pain or suffering" or if an animal poses a danger to the general public. The latter will be a reason for euthanasia only if an authority concerned with public safety orders it based on an investigation. Because of the ruling, all German animal shelters are practically no-kill shelters. Facilities must be led by a person who is certified in the handling of animals. Most shelters contract veterinarians to provide medical care.

=== Czech Republic ===
In the Czech Republic, approximately 42% of households own a pet, most commonly dogs and cats. Animal shelters in the country generally prioritise adoption over euthanasia or long-term housing. A study conducted between 2011 and 2015 across three Czech regions reported that 65% of cats entering shelters were adopted, while the remaining outcomes included unassisted death, euthanasia, or return to their original caretakers. Most cats admitted to shelters were under six months old and predominantly female, with intake rates peaking in summer and autumn.

A separate study analysing 3,875 dogs housed in Czech municipal shelters between 2010 and 2013 found that lost dogs were typically reclaimed within one day, whereas abandoned dogs had a median waiting time of 23 days before adoption. Purebred dogs were adopted more quickly than crossbreeds.

=== India ===
Goshalas are a type of shelter for homeless, unwanted or elderly cattle in India. Cows are venerated by many Hindus and slaughter of cattle is illegal in most places in the country.

=== New Zealand ===
In New Zealand, dog pounds are run by each territorial local authority, which provide animal control services under the Dog Control Act 1996.

=== Poland ===
In Poland, it is allowed to euthanize animals in shelters only because of illness. However, it is permitted to kill blind litters as they are considered dependent.

=== United Kingdom ===
In the United Kingdom, animal shelters are more commonly known as rescue or rehoming centres and are run by charitable organizations. The most prominent rescue and rehoming organizations are the RSPCA, Cats Protection and the Dogs Trust.

=== United States ===
In the United States there is no government-run organization that provides oversight or regulation of the various shelters on a national basis. However, many individual states regulate shelters within their jurisdiction. One of the earliest comprehensive measures was the Georgia Animal Protection Act of 1986, a law enacted in response to the inhumane treatment of companion animals by a pet store chain in Atlanta. It provided for the licensing and regulation of pet shops, stables, kennels, and animal shelters, and it established, for the first time, minimum standards of care. The Georgia Department of Agriculture was tasked with licensing animal shelters and enforcing the new law through the Department's newly created Animal Protection Division. An additional provision, added in 1990, was the Humane Euthanasia Act, the first state law to mandate intravenous injection of sodium pentothal in place of gas chambers and other less humane methods. The law was further expanded and strengthened with the Animal Protection Act of 2000.

Currently, it is estimated that there are approximately 5,000 independently-run animal shelters operating nationwide. Shelters have redefined their role since the 1990s. No longer serving as a lifelong repository for strays and drop-offs, modern shelters have taken the lead in controlling the pet population, promoting pet adoption and studying shelter animals' health and behavior. To prevent animal euthanization, some shelters offer behavioral assessments of animals and training classes to make them more adoptable to the public. Most shelters also provide medical care that includes spaying and neutering to prevent overpopulation.

Shelters and shelter-like volunteer organizations responded to cat overpopulation with trap-neuter-return (TNR) programs, which reduced feral cat populations and reduced the burden on shelters.

In the United States, many government-run animal shelters operate in conditions that are far from ideal. During the 2008 financial crisis, many government shelters ran out of adequate space and financial resources. Shelters unable to raise additional funds to provide for the increased number of incoming animals have no choice but to euthanize them, sometimes within days. In 2012, approximately four million cats and dogs died in U.S. shelters. However, recent years have seen a dramatic drop in the number of animals euthanized in shelters, falling up to 75% in some large cities, due mainly to a successful push to promote spaying and neutering of pets.

== See also ==
- Chien Chih-cheng – Taiwanese animal shelter worker who committed suicide due to stress of euthanizing animals due to persistent overcrowding
- Pet adoption
- Society for the Prevention of Cruelty to Animals
- Society for the Protection of Animals – French animal protection association
