= Redemption: The Myth of Pet Overpopulation and the No Kill Revolution in America =

2007 book by Nathan Winograd

- First edition
- Author: Nathan Winograd
- Language: English
- Genre: Nonfiction
- Publisher: Almaden Books
- Publication date: 2007
- Publication place: United States
- Pages: 229
- ISBN: 0-9790743-0-4

Redemption: The Myth of Pet Overpopulation and the No Kill Revolution in America is a book by author Nathan Winograd.

The book has received reviews from Choice Online and the Library Journal.

== See also ==
- Richard Avanzino
