= Overpopulation of domestic pets =

In some countries, there is an overpopulation of pets such as cats, dogs, and exotic animals. In the United States, six to eight million animals are brought to shelters each year, of which an estimated three to four million are subsequently euthanized, including 2.7 million considered healthy and adoptable. Euthanasia numbers have declined since the 1970s, when U.S. shelters euthanized an estimated 12 to 20 million animals. Most humane societies, animal shelters, and rescue groups urge animal caregivers to have their animals spayed or neutered to prevent the births of unwanted and accidental litters that could contribute to this dynamic.

== Statistics ==
In 2023, there were an estimated 480 million stray cats and at least 675 million stray dogs worldwide.

=== Bahrain ===
In Bahrain, the stray dog population was estimated to be approximately 10,000 in 2014. The Bahrain Society for the Prevention of Cruelty to Animals (BSPCA) created a "catch, neuter, return" program (CNR) in September 2013, with start up funds provided by Dog Trust. The program has been widely praised as effective in reducing aggression and bettering the health of the stray dog populations in multiple geographical areas. The CNR program was intended to last five years and lead to the eradication of the stray populations. However, funds were depleted after the successful neutering of 1,200 stray dogs, prompting the BSPCA to request financial assistance from the Bahraini government. A spokesperson for the BSPCA has stated that the response from authorities has been to send police officers out to shoot the dogs on the street. The stray dogs have been responsible for multiple attacks on livestock, including four separate attacks in a single month. Shaikha Marwa bint Abdulrahman Al Khalifa, a member of Bahrain's royal family, stated she and the BSPCA have plans to build a shelter for the dogs to neuter and rehabilitate them. The shelter would be located near Al Areen Wildlife Park and Reserve and was slated to open in the beginning of 2016.

=== Canada ===
The Canadian Federation of Humane Societies (CFHS) has been collecting statistics from Canadian animal shelters since 1993. A survey in 2013 included data from 100 of 186 humane societies and SPCAs. However, municipal animal services agencies were not included, hence "the data in this report represents only a fraction of homeless companion animals in Canada." In 2012, the surveyed shelters took in just over 188,000 animals, and euthanized 65,423 animals, representing 35% of all intakes. Six times as many cats were euthanized as dogs, or 41% of cats and 15% of dogs. The report said a gradually improving trend, but that cats have a far worse outcome than dogs: "More than twice as many cats enter shelters than dogs, and though adoption rates for cats are similar to those for dogs, fewer cats are reclaimed and many more are euthanized."

=== India ===
India has about 79.1 million stray cats and dogs. India represents 70% of worldwide human rabies cases, many of which are attributed to stray dogs.

=== Mexico ===
Mexico has about 18.8 million stray animals.

=== Brazil ===
There are an estimated 30 million stray animals in Brazil.

=== China ===
China has around 40 million stray animals.

=== E.U. ===
Trap Neuter Release (TNR) programs were implemented in the 1950s.

=== United States ===
Estimates of animals brought to shelters and of animals subsequently euthanized in the U.S. have issues with their reliability. The Humane Society of the United States provides shelter statistics with this caution: "There is no central data reporting system for U.S. animal shelters and rescues. These estimates are based on information provided by the (former) National Council on Pet Population Study and Policy."

==== 1993-1997 ====
A 1993 study of US dog populations considered a wider range of sources than animal shelters. The study found that 4 million dogs entered shelters, with 2.4 million (or 60%) euthanized (p. 203).

The National Council on Pet Population Study and Policy conducted a survey over four years, 1994–1997, and cautions against the use of their survey for wider estimates: "It is not possible to use these statistics to estimate the numbers of animals entering animal shelters in the United States, or the numbers euthanized on an annual basis. The reporting Shelters may not represent a random sampling of U.S. shelters." Summary statistics from the survey said that in 1997, 4.3 million animals entered the surveyed shelters; the shelters euthanized 62.6% of them, or 2.8 million animals. These numbers broke down to 56.4% of dogs euthanized, and 71% of cats. The original survey was sent to 5,042 shelters housing at least 100 dogs and cats each year, of whom only 1,008 shelters participated in 1997.

==== 2008-2019 ====
The American Humane Association said the difficulties in estimating numbers, and provides a higher figure, saying that in 2008, an estimated 3.7 million animals were euthanized in shelters.

The HSUS provided numbers of 6 to 8 million animals taken to shelters, 3 to 4 million animals euthanized, and 2.7 million of the euthanized animals being healthy and adoptable, as estimates for 2012–2013, and also for annual figures in an August 2014 article. The American Society for the Prevention of Cruelty to Animals provides alternate numbers for 2014, saying that there are about 13,600 community animal shelters in the US. "There is no national organization monitoring these shelters", and "no government institution or animal organization is responsible for tabulating national statistics for the animal protection movement." However, national estimates are provided of 7.6 million animals entering shelters each year, with 2.7 million of them euthanized.

"Based on 2019 data, the American Society for the Prevention of Cruelty to Animals (ASPCA) estimates 3.1 million dogs and 3.2 million cats enter US animal shelters annually,” with about 920,000 being euthanized every year.

==== 2020-2021 ====
During the COVID-19 pandemic, with many people staying home, increased numbers of animals were adopted, resulting in less animals being stray and/or euthanized. For example, "the total number of pets in Australia has increased from 28.5 million in 2019 to 30.4 million in 2021.” However, as schedules returned to normal, an increased number of people returned those new pets to the shelters, resulting in shelter overcrowding and increased euthanasia.

== Why animals become strays ==
=== Owner relinquishment ===
Large numbers of animals are placed in shelters by pet owners each year for reasons such as moving, allergies, behavioral problems, and lack of time or money, or life events (marriage, birth of a new baby).

During multiple interviews conducted by Colorado State University graduates and other college graduates, over 3,000 pet owners were asked about their relinquishment of domestic animals. Among these owners, about 3,600 dogs and litters and 1,400 cats and litters had been relinquished. According to the university's research, some of the top 10 reasons for relinquishment were problems with other pets in the house, the owner having personal problems, landlords not allowing pets, and cost. The university found that the top reason for relinquishment is aggression towards people. Based on third party research conducted by Canine Journal, it was found that 1 in 74 people will be a victim to dog bites. However, some breeds tend to bite more than other breeds.

According to ASPCA the two other major reasons for relinquishment, other than behavioral problems with the pet, are family situations and housing issues. Of these pets that are being "re-homed", ASPCA provides statistics showing 37% of these pets are re-homed with a friend or family member. Shelters become the new "home" for 36% of relinquished pets, even though many people would want this to be their last resort. Each year 6.5 million domestic pets enter shelters, these shelters are being massively overwhelmed by the intake of animals. Most shelters are not capable of getting all of these animals adopted, which unfortunately leads to many animals being euthanized.

=== Unexpected babies ===
Some animal owners believe their female pets should have one litter before being spayed, although this offers no benefit for the animals, resulting in unwanted babies that can become strays. Others simply neglect to spay/neuter or delay the procedure until it is too late. Dogs reach sexual maturity between 6 and 9 months and some animals can get pregnant again immediately after giving birth, making timing of spay procedures difficult for owners.

=== Lost pets ===
Pets may escape during stressful events, such as fireworks displays, when newly adopted, or when being cared for by a pet sitter. Pets also frequently get lost during natural disasters such as hurricanes.

=== Pet hoarders ===
Animal hoarding is one of the most common forms of animal cruelty in the U.S. and is considered an unintentional form of abuse resulting from hoarding disorder. According to the ASPCA, about 250,000 animals per year in the United States are the victims of hoarding. Hoarders own such a large number of animals that they are unable to provide them with basic care. This may result initially from "taking in strays or by failing, because of cost or other reasons, to have animals sterilized and, as a result, care for litter after litter of puppies or kittens” Most commonly affected animals are cats, followed by dogs, but other animals such as rabbits, horses, reptiles, birds, and exotics are hoarded as well.

Hoarded animals are typically severely malnourished because the owner cannot afford or remember to feed them all. They usually do not receive veterinary care, may have untreated medical conditions, and are not spayed or neutered.

"It is important to understand that not everyone who keeps many animals has a hoarding disorder. The critical distinction is the inability of individuals with hoarding disorders to care for their animals properly. In hoarding situations, the animals and their owner physically suffer from the behavior, and they live in unsanitary conditions."

=== Purebred animals ===
==== Purebred animals entering the shelter system ====
The American Pet Products Association says that since purebreds are only 5% to 6% of the US pet cat population, the overpopulation problem is mainly due to mixed or random bred animals, and avoiding purebred cats would make little difference. However, the Humane Society of the United States (HSUS) says that 25% of the dogs who enter animal shelters are purebred. The CFA also says that cat overpopulation is due to free roaming, unaltered pet cats, and feral cats, not purebreds.

The best practices set by the AKC for responsible breeders include screening customers so animals are placed in a good home, and follow up services including collecting long-term health and development data about animals they have bred, and guaranteeing to take back any animals if their situation is not mutually beneficial for the pet and the owner, and then placing them in a new home.

==== People choosing purebred animals over adopting from shelters ====
The American Kennel Club (AKC) and the Cat Fanciers' Association (CFA) say the benefits of purebred dogs or cats include that they have been developed over time to show specific traits that are useful for hunting, rescue, assistance and other needs. Animal buyers, including pet owners, may choose a purebred to ensure they know ahead of time the size and other characteristics a young animal will grow into. The CFA also says that purebred cats may make better pets because they have a weaker hunting instinct. The AKC says breeders offer services and information about the animals they sell, such as a detailed pedigree, and expertise in the health and temperament of the breed they specialize in.

==== Puppy mills ====
Backyard breeding and puppy mills are motivated by profit and the perceived high demand for a particular breed, often without concern for the health or welfare of the animals involved. These animals may be sold through pet stores or directly from the breeders themselves. The AKC says that their organization serves to prevent animal cruelty by suspending the benefits of their breed registry and other services from members convicted of animal cruelty, and that their inspection program actively uncovers cases of inhumane treatment of dogs. The HSUS says the AKC has lobbied against laws to stop puppy mills, and that many of the breeders certified as humane by AKC inspectors were later convicted of animal cruelty offenses, while the AKC says it has favored legislation that is necessary, but worked to stop well-intentioned laws that are unenforceable or counterproductive, such as kennel population limits that may harm genetic diversity.

== Effects ==
Dealing with a population of unwanted domestic animals is a major concern to animal welfare and animal rights groups.

Domestic animal overpopulation can be an ecological concern. Stray animals often feed on wildlife, causing native species decline. For example, outdoor cats kill an estimated 2.4 billion birds each year in the U.S. Unwanted pets released into the wild may also function as invasive species and contribute to severe ecosystem damage (e.g. the effect of introducing exotic snakes into Florida's Everglades). Dogs have reduced populations of many animals such as mountain gazelle in Israel and kiwi birds in New Zealand.

With overpopulation of domestic pets and limited spaces to shelter them, the amount of homeless animals contracting diseases is rising. Stray animals eating wildlife also serves as a potential disease vector from wildlife to humans. This is a public health concern to people all over the world as diseases, like canine rabies, can spread rapidly from animals to humans. 99% of human rabies cases and 95% of human rabies-related deaths are attributed to dogs. According to the World Health Organization (WHO), over 3 billion people in Asia and Africa are at high risk of contracting canine rabies, with tens of thousands dying each year. "Rabies transmission from stray dogs causes 59,000 deaths globally yearly."

== See also ==
- Neutering
- Immunocontraception
- Chien Chih-cheng, Taiwanese animal shelter worker who committed suicide as a result of the stress caused by euthanizing hundreds of animals due to persistent overcrowding
