= List of acts of the Parliament of the United Kingdom from 1814 =

This is a complete list of acts of the Parliament of the United Kingdom for the year 1814.

Note that the first parliament of the United Kingdom was held in 1801; parliaments between 1707 and 1800 were either parliaments of Great Britain or of Ireland). For acts passed up until 1707, see the list of acts of the Parliament of England and the list of acts of the Parliament of Scotland. For acts passed from 1707 to 1800, see the list of acts of the Parliament of Great Britain. See also the list of acts of the Parliament of Ireland.

For acts of the devolved parliaments and assemblies in the United Kingdom, see the list of acts of the Scottish Parliament, the list of acts of the Northern Ireland Assembly, and the list of acts and measures of Senedd Cymru; see also the list of acts of the Parliament of Northern Ireland.

The number shown after each act's title is its chapter number. Acts passed before 1963 are cited using this number, preceded by the year(s) of the reign during which the relevant parliamentary session was held; thus the Union with Ireland Act 1800 is cited as "39 & 40 Geo. 3 c. 67", meaning the 67th act passed during the session that started in the 39th year of the reign of George III and which finished in the 40th year of that reign. Note that the modern convention is to use Arabic numerals in citations (thus "41 Geo. 3" rather than "41 Geo. III"). Acts of the last session of the Parliament of Great Britain and the first session of the Parliament of the United Kingdom are both cited as "41 Geo. 3". Acts passed from 1963 onwards are simply cited by calendar year and chapter number.

All modern acts have a short title, e.g. "the Local Government Act 2003". Some earlier acts also have a short title given to them by later acts, such as by the Short Titles Act 1896.

== 54 Geo. 3 ==
Continuing the second session of the 5th Parliament of the United Kingdom, which met from 4 November 1813 until 30 July 1814.

This session was also traditionally cited as 54 G. 3.

=== Public general acts ===
Short title	Citation	Royal assent
Long title
Actions Against Spiritual Persons Act 1814 (repealed)	54 Geo. 3. c. 44	19 April 1814
An Act to continue, until the Twentieth Day of May One thousand eight hundred and fourteen, an Act passed in this Session of Parliament, (Note: Actions Against Spiritual Persons Act 1813 (54 Geo. 3. c. 6)) intituled "An Act to stay, until the Twentieth Day of April One thousand eight hundred and fourteen, Proceedings in Actions under an Act passed in the Forty third Year of His present Majesty, (Note: Benefices (England) Act 1803 (43 Geo. 3. c. 84)) to amend the Laws relating to Spiritual Persons." (Repealed by Statute Law Revision Act 1873 (36 & 37 Vict. c. 91))
Purchase of Legal Quays, Port of London Act 1814 (repealed)	54 Geo. 3. c. 45	19 April 1814
An Act to continue the Period for purchasing the Legal Quays in the Port of London. (Repealed by Statute Law (Repeals) Act 1993 (c. 50))
Writs of Assistance Act 1814 (repealed)	54 Geo. 3. c. 46	19 April 1814
An Act for altering the Period during which Writs of Assistance shall remain in force. (Repealed by Customs Law Repeal Act 1825 (6 Geo. 4. c. 105))
Coffee, etc. Act 1814 (repealed)	54 Geo. 3. c. 47	19 April 1814
An Act to revive and make perpetual certain Acts for consolidating and extending the several Laws in force for allowing the Importation and Exportation of certain Articles into and from certain Ports in the West Indies. (Repealed by Statute Law Revision Act 1873 (36 & 37 Vict. c. 91))
Trade of West Indies Act 1814 (repealed)	54 Geo. 3. c. 48	19 April 1814
An Act to revive and make perpetual certain Acts for consolidating and extending the several Laws in force for allowing the Importation and Exportation of certain Articles into and from certain Ports in the West Indies. (Repealed by Trade Act 1822 (3 Geo. 4. c. 44))
Trade of West Indies, etc. Act 1814 (repealed)	54 Geo. 3. c. 49	19 April 1814
An Act to revive and continue, until the Expiration of Nine Months after the Conclusion of the War with the United States of America, an Act made in the last Session of Parliament, (Note: Exportation and Importation Act 1813 (53 Geo. 3. c. 67)) to authorize the Importation and Exportation of certain Articles into and from the West Indies, South America and Newfoundland. (Repealed by Statute Law Revision Act 1873 (36 & 37 Vict. c. 91))
Customs Act 1814 (repealed)	54 Geo. 3. c. 50	4 May 1814
An Act to amend so much of an Act of His present Majesty, (Note: Customs (No. 3) Act 1809 (49 Geo. 3. c. 98)) for repealing the several Duties of Customs, and granting other Duties in lieu thereof, as relates to the Duties payable on Salt exported. (Repealed by Statute Law Revision Act 1861 (24 & 25 Vict. c. 101))
Importation Act 1814 (repealed)	54 Geo. 3. c. 51	4 May 1814
An Act to revive and further continue, until Nine Months after the Conclusion of the present War, an Act of the Seventh Year of King George the Second, (Note: Importation Act 1733 (7 Geo. 2. c. 18)) for the free Importation of Cochineal and Indigo. (Repealed by Statute Law Revision Act 1873 (36 & 37 Vict. c. 91))
Gold Currency Act 1814 (repealed)	54 Geo. 3. c. 52	4 May 1814
An Act to revive and continue, during the Continuance of any Act imposing any Restriction on the Governor and Company of the Bank of England with respect to Payments in Cash, an Act of the Fifty second Year of His present Majesty, (Note: Gold Currency, etc. Act 1812 (52 Geo. 3. c. 50)) for making more effectual Provision for preventing the Current Gold Coin of the Realm from being paid or accepted for a greater Value than the Current Value of such Coin; and for other Purposes therein mentioned. (Repealed by Statute Law Revision Act 1873 (36 & 37 Vict. c. 91))
Exchequer Bills Act 1814 (repealed)	54 Geo. 3. c. 53	4 May 1814
An Act to enable the Commissioners of His Majesty's Treasury to issue Exchequer Bills, on the Credit of such Aids or Supplies as have been or shall be granted by Parliament for the Service of Great Britain for the Year One thousand eight hundred and fourteen. (Repealed by Statute Law Revision Act 1873 (36 & 37 Vict. c. 91))
Suits Against Spiritual Persons Act 1814 (repealed)	54 Geo. 3. c. 54	18 May 1814
An Act to discontinue Proceedings in certain Actions already commenced, and to prevent vexatious Suits against Spiritual Persons, under an Act passed in the Forty third Year of His present Majesty; and further to continue, until the Twentieth Day of July One thousand eight hundred and fourteen, an Act of the present Session of Parliament, for staying Proceedings under the said Act. (Repealed by Statute Law Revision Act 1873 (36 & 37 Vict. c. 91))
Quartering of Soldiers Act 1814 (repealed)	54 Geo. 3. c. 55	18 May 1814
An Act for fixing the Rates of Subsistence to be paid to Inn-keepers and others on quartering Soldiers. (Repealed by Statute Law Revision Act 1873 (36 & 37 Vict. c. 91))
Sculpture Copyright Act 1814 (repealed)	54 Geo. 3. c. 56	18 May 1814
An Act to amend and render more effectual an Act of His present Majesty, (Note: Copyright Act 1798 (38 Geo. 3. c. 71)) for encouraging the Art of making new Models and Casts of Busts, and other Things therein mentioned; and for giving further Encouragement to such Arts. (Repealed by Copyright Act 1911 (1 & 2 Geo. 5. c. 46))
Exportation Act 1814 (repealed)	54 Geo. 3. c. 57	27 May 1814
An Act to repeal the Schedule annexed to an Act of the Forty fifth Year of His present Majesty, by which the Drawbacks and Bounties on Sugar exported are to be ascertained, and Substituting another in lieu thereof; and to permit the Importation of Sugar, Coffee and other Articles, the Produce of Martinique, Mariegalante, (Note: Marie-Galante, a dependency of Guadeloupe.) Saint Eustatia, (Note: Sint Eustatius.) Saint Martin and Suba, under the same Duties and Regulations as similar Articles of the British Plantations, to continue until the Fifth Day of April One thousand eight hundred and fifteen. (Repealed by Statute Law Revision Act 1873 (36 & 37 Vict. c. 91))
Protection of Trade During Hostilities Act 1814 (repealed)	54 Geo. 3. c. 58	27 May 1814
An Act to continue, during the present Hostilities with the United States of America, an Act of the Forty third Year of His present Majesty, (Note: Trade During Hostilities Act 1803 (43 Geo. 3. c. 57)) for the better Protection of the Trade of the United Kingdom. (Repealed by Statute Law Revision Act 1873 (36 & 37 Vict. c. 91))
Slave Trade Act 1814 (repealed)	54 Geo. 3. c. 59	27 May 1814
An Act to allow ships taken and condemned for being used in carrying on the Slave Trade to be registered as British-built Ships. (Repealed by Statute Law Revision Act 1861 (24 & 25 Vict. c. 101))
Embezzlement of Cordage Act 1814 (repealed)	54 Geo. 3. c. 60	27 May 1814
An Act for the better preventing the Embezzlement of His Majesty's Cordage. (Repealed by Public Stores Act 1875 (38 & 39 Vict. c. 25))
Public Office in Colony Act 1814 (repealed)	54 Geo. 3. c. 61	27 May 1814
An Act to amend an Act of the Twenty second Year of His present Majesty, intituled "An Act to prevent the granting in future any Patent Office, to be exercised in any Colony or Plantation, now or at any Time hereafter belonging to The Crown of Great Britain, for any longer Term than during such Time as the Grantee thereof, or Person appointed thereto, shall discharge the Duty thereof in Person, and behave well therein." (Note: Colonial Leave of Absence Act 1782 (22 Geo. 3. c. 75)) (Repealed by Colonial Officers (Leave of Absence) Act 1894 (57 & 58 Vict. c. 17))
County Infirmaries (Ireland) Act 1814 (repealed)	54 Geo. 3. c. 62	27 May 1814
An Act to amend several Acts for erecting or establishing Public Infirmaries or Hospitals in Ireland so far as relates to the Surgeons and Apothecaries of such Infirmaries or Hospitals. (Repealed by Statute Law Revision Act 1873 (36 & 37 Vict. c. 91) and Health Services (Northern Ireland) Act 1948 (c. 3 (N.I.)))
Dublin Record Office Act 1814 or the Dublin General Post Office Act 1814 (repealed)	54 Geo. 3. c. 63	27 May 1814
An Act to amend several Acts for enabling His Majesty's Postmaster General of Ireland to purchase Premises for the Enlargement of the General Post Office in the City of Dublin. (Repealed by Statute Law (Repeals) Act 2013 (c. 2))
Customs (No. 2) Act 1814 (repealed)	54 Geo. 3. c. 64	27 May 1814
An Act to continue until the Fifth Day of July One thousand eight hundred and fifteen, certain Temporary or War Duties of Customs on the Importation of Goods, Wares and Merchandize into Great Britain. (Repealed by Statute Law Revision Act 1861 (24 & 25 Vict. c. 101))
Customs (No. 3) Act 1814 (repealed)	54 Geo. 3. c. 65	27 May 1814
An Act to repeal certain Duties on French Goods imported into Great Britain, and on Foreign Hides exported to France, and to grant other Duties on French Goods so imported. (Repealed by Statute Law Revision Act 1861 (24 & 25 Vict. c. 101))
Customs (No. 4) Act 1814 (repealed)	54 Geo. 3. c. 66	27 May 1814
An Act to repeal the Duties on Teak Wood and other Ship Timber imported from the East Indies; and to repeal so much of an Act of the Nineteenth Year of His late Majesty, (Note: Sail Cloth Act 1745 (19 Geo. 2. c. 27)) as exempts Captains of Vessels coming from the East Indies, from Penalties for having Foreign-made Sails. (Repealed by Statute Law Revision Act 1861 (24 & 25 Vict. c. 101))
Justiciary Courts (Scotland) Act 1814 (repealed)	54 Geo. 3. c. 67	27 May 1814
An Act to allow Viva Voce Verdicts to be returned to the High Court and Circuit Courts of Judiciary of Scotland, in certain Cases; and for allowing Appeals to the Circuit Courts of Judiciary, in Civil Cases, to a certain Amount. (Repealed by Statute Law (Repeals) Act 1986 (c. 12))
Ecclesiastical Proctors (Ireland) Act 1814 (repealed)	54 Geo. 3. c. 68	17 June 1814
An Act for the better Regulation of Ecclesiastical Courts in Ireland; and for the more easy Recovery of Church Rates and Tithes. (Repealed by Statute Law Revision Act (Northern Ireland) 1954 (c. 35 (N.I.)))
Customs (No. 5) Act 1814 (repealed)	54 Geo. 3. c. 69	17 June 1814
An Act to permit the Exportation of Corn, Grain, Meal, Malt and Flour, from any Part of the United Kingdom, without Payment of Duty, or receiving of Bounty. (Repealed by Statute Law Revision Act 1861 (24 & 25 Vict. c. 101))
Crown Lands Act 1814 (repealed)	54 Geo. 3. c. 70	17 June 1814
An Act for the further Improvement of the Land Revenue of The Crown. (Repealed by Statute Law Revision Act 1873 (36 & 37 Vict. c. 91))
Manufacture of Maidstone Geneva Act 1814 (repealed)	54 Geo. 3. c. 71	17 June 1814
An Act to revive and continue, until the Fifth Day of July One thousand eight hundred and nineteen, the Manufacture of Maidstone Geneva. (Repealed by Statute Law Revision Act 1873 (36 & 37 Vict. c. 91))
Trade Act 1814 (repealed)	54 Geo. 3. c. 72	17 June 1814
An Act for permitting a Trade between The United Provinces and certain Colonies now in His Majesty's Possession. (Repealed by Trade of Demerara, etc. Act 1816 (56 Geo. 3. c. 91))
Excise Act 1814 (repealed)	54 Geo. 3. c. 73	17 June 1814
An Act to continue until the Fifth Day of July One thousand eight hundred and fifteen, certain Additional Duties of Excise in Great Britain. (Repealed by Statute Law Revision Act 1873 (36 & 37 Vict. c. 91))
Lotteries Act 1814 (repealed)	54 Geo. 3. c. 74	17 June 1814
An Act for granting to His Majesty a Sum of Money to be raised by Lotteries. (Repealed by Statute Law Revision Act 1873 (36 & 37 Vict. c. 91))
Treasury Bills (Ireland) Act 1814 (repealed)	54 Geo. 3. c. 75	20 June 1814
An Act for raising the Sum of One Million seven hundred and sixteen thousand six hundred and sixty six Pounds Thirteen Shillings and Four pence Irish Currency, by Treasury Bills, for the Service of Ireland, for the Tear One thousand eight hundred and fourteen. (Repealed by Statute Law Revision Act 1873 (36 & 37 Vict. c. 91))
National Debt Act 1814 (repealed)	54 Geo. 3. c. 76	28 June 1814
An Act for raising the Sum of Twenty four Millions by way of Annuities. (Repealed by Statute Law Revision Act 1870 (33 & 34 Vict. c. 69))
Customs (No. 6) Act 1814 (repealed)	54 Geo. 3. c. 77	28 June 1814
An Act to amend an Act of the Fifty third Year of His present Majesty, (Note: Duties on Cape Wines Act 1813 (53 Geo. 3. c. 84)) for repealing the Duties payable on the Importation of Wine the Produce of the Cape of Good Hope, and its Dependencies, and charging other Duties in lieu thereof. (Repealed by Statute Law Revision Act 1861 (24 & 25 Vict. c. 101))
Removal of Wool Act 1814 (repealed)	54 Geo. 3. c. 78	28 June 1814
An Act to repeal so much of an Act passed in the Ninth and Tenth Year of the Reign of King William the Third, (Note: Exportation Act 1697 (9 Will. 3. c. 40)) and of another Act passed in the Twenty eighth Year of His present Majesty, (Note: Exportation (No. 2) Act 1788 (28 Geo. 3. c. 38)) as respects the Removal of Wool, within a certain Distance of the Sea. (Repealed by Statute Law Revision Act 1873 (36 & 37 Vict. c. 91))
Exchequer Bills (No. 2) Act 1814 (repealed)	54 Geo. 3. c. 79	1 July 1814
An Act for raising the Sum of Six Millions, by Exchequer Bills, for the Service of Great Britain, for the Tear One thousand eight hundred and fourteen. (Repealed by Statute Law Revision Act 1873 (36 & 37 Vict. c. 91))
Exchequer Bills (No. 3) Act 1814 (repealed)	54 Geo. 3. c. 80	1 July 1814
An Act for raising the Sum of One Million five hundred thousand Pounds, by Exchequer Bills, for the Service of Great Britain, for the Year One thousand eight hundred and fourteen. (Repealed by Statute Law Revision Act 1873 (36 & 37 Vict. c. 91))
Importation and Exportation Act 1814 (repealed)	54 Geo. 3. c. 81	1 July 1814
An Act to continue until the Fifth Day of July One thousand eight hundred and fifteen, and to amend several Acts for granting certain Rates and Duties, and for allowing certain Drawbacks and Bounties on Goods, Wares and Merchandize imported into and exported from Ireland, and to grant until the said Fifth Day of July One thousand eight hundred and fifteen certain new Duties on the Importation, and to allow Drawbacks on the Exportation of certain Goods, Wares and Merchandize into and from Ireland, and to make further Regulations for securing the Collection of the said Duties. (Repealed by Statute Law Revision Act 1873 (36 & 37 Vict. c. 91))
Auction Duties (Ireland) Act 1814 (repealed)	54 Geo. 3. c. 82	1 July 1814
An Act to grant to His Majesty Duties upon Auctions in Ireland, in lieu of former Duties thereon, and to provide for the regulating and securing the Collection of the said Duties, and to prevent Frauds therein. (Repealed by Auctioneers Act 1845 (8 & 9 Vict. c. 15))
Exchequer (Ireland) Act 1814 (repealed)	54 Geo. 3. c. 83	1 July 1814
An Act for the more effectual Regulation of the Receipts and Issues of His Majesty's Treasury, and for securing the due Application of Money coming into the Hands of the Public Accountants, in Ireland. (Repealed by Statute Law Revision Act 1873 (36 & 37 Vict. c. 91))
Quarter Sessions Act 1814 (repealed)	54 Geo. 3. c. 84	1 July 1814
An Act for regulating the Time of holding the Michaelmas Quarter Sessions in England. (Repealed by Criminal Justice Act 1925 (15 & 16 Geo. 5. c. 86))
National Debt (No. 2) Act 1814 (repealed)	54 Geo. 3. c. 85	14 July 1814
An Act for raising the Sum of Three Millions, by way of Annuities for the Service of Ireland. (Repealed by Statute Law Revision Act 1870 (33 & 34 Vict. c. 69))
Army Prize Money Act 1814 (repealed)	54 Geo. 3. c. 86	14 July 1814
An Act for regulating the Payment of Army Prize Money; and to provide for the Payment of unclaimed and forfeited Shares to Chelsea Hospital. (Repealed by Army Prize Money Act 1832 (2 & 3 Will. 4. c. 53))
Duties, etc., on Glass (Ireland) Act 1814 (repealed)	54 Geo. 3. c. 87	14 July 1814
An Act to grant Duties of Excise on certain Sorts of Glass made In Ireland, and to grant and allow certain Countervailing Duties and Drawbacks in respect thereof. (Repealed by Duties on Glass, etc. (Ireland) Act 1814 (55 Geo. 3. c. 7))
Duties on Spirits (Ireland) Act 1814 (repealed)	54 Geo. 3. c. 88	14 July 1814
An Act to amend the several Acts for regulating and securing the Collection of the Duties on Spirits distilled in Ireland. (Repealed by Statute Law Revision Act 1861 (24 & 25 Vict. c. 101))
National Debt Reduction Act 1814 (repealed)	54 Geo. 3. c. 89	14 July 1814
An Act for the Charge of the further Addition to the Public Funded Debt of Great Britain, for the Service of the Year One thousand eight hundred and fourteen. (Repealed by Statute Law Revision Act 1870 (33 & 34 Vict. c. 69))
Bridges Act 1814 (repealed)	54 Geo. 3. c. 90	14 July 1814
An Act to explain and extend an Act, passed in the Forty third Year of His present Majesty, intituled, "An Act for remedy Defects in the Laws relative to the building and repairing of County Bridges, and other Works maintained at the Expence of the Inhabitants of Counties in England;" (Note: Bridges Act 1803 (43 Geo. 3. c. 59)) and for extending the said Act to Bridges and other Works maintained at the Expence of Hundreds. (Repealed by Highways Act 1959 (7 & 8 Eliz. 2. c. 25))
Poor Law (Overseers) Act 1814 (repealed)	54 Geo. 3. c. 91	14 July 1814
An Act to amend so much of an Act, passed in the Forty third Year of Her late Majesty Queen Elizabeth, (Note: Poor Relief Act 1601 (43 Eliz. 1. c. 2)) as concerns the time of appointing Overseers of the Poor. (Repealed by Rating and Valuation Act 1925 (15 & 16 Geo. 5. c. 90) and Rating and Valuation Act (Repeals, etc.) Order 1927 (SR&O 1927/57))
Probate and Legacy Duties (Ireland) Act 1814 (repealed)	54 Geo. 3. c. 92	14 July 1814
An Act to secure the Payment of Stamp Duties on Probates and Letters of Administration, and on Receipts for Property obtained by Legacy, or Intestacy in Ireland. (Repealed by Statute Law (Repeals) Act 1978 (c. 45))
Navy Prize Money Act 1814 (repealed)	54 Geo. 3. c. 93	18 July 1814
An Act for regulating the Payment of Navy Prize Money, and the Transmission of Accounts and Payment of Balances to Greenwich Hospital. (Repealed by Naval Prize Money, etc. Act 1818 (58 Geo. 3. c. 64) and Naval Prize Acts Repeal Act 1864 (27 & 28 Vict. c. 23))
Annuities to Retired Judges (Scotland) Act 1814 (repealed)	54 Geo. 3. c. 94	18 July 1814
An Act to grant additional Annuities to Judges of the Courts of Session, Judiciary and Exchequer, in Scotland, who had resigned their Offices before the last Augmentation of Salaries granted to the Judges of those Courts. (Repealed by Statute Law Revision Act 1873 (36 & 37 Vict. c. 91))
Judges' Pensions (Ireland) Act 1814 (repealed)	54 Geo. 3. c. 95	18 July 1814
An Act to enable His Majesty to grant additional Annuities to the Judges of the Court of King's Bench, Judges of the Courts of Common Picas and Exchequer, in Ireland, on the Resignation of their Offices. (Repealed for Northern Ireland by Statute Law Revision Act 1950 (14 Geo. 6. c. 6))
Apprentices Act 1814 (repealed)	54 Geo. 3. c. 96	18 July 1814
An Act to amend an Act passed in the Fifth Year of Queen Elizabeth, intituled "An Act containing divers Orders for Artificers, Labourers, Servants of Husbandry, and Apprentices." (Note: Statute of Artificers 1562 (5 Eliz. 1. c. 4)) (Repealed by Statute Law (Repeals) Act 2004 (c. 14))
Duties on Glass (Great Britain) Act 1814 (repealed)	54 Geo. 3. c. 97	18 July 1814
An Act to continue until the First Day of August One thousand eight hundred and fifteen, several Laws relating to the Duties on Glass made in Great Britain; for granting an Excise Duty on Common Glass Bottles imported; and for the further Prevention of Frauds in the Exportation of Glass. (Repealed by Statute Law Revision Act 1861 (24 & 25 Vict. c. 101))
Accounts of Expenditure in France Act 1814 (repealed)	54 Geo. 3. c. 98	18 July 1814
An Act to empower the Auditor General of the Accounts in Spain and Portugal to examine Accounts of Public Expenditure in France. (Repealed by Statute Law Revision Act 1873 (36 & 37 Vict. c. 91))
Restriction on Cash Payments Act 1814 (repealed)	54 Geo. 3. c. 99	18 July 1814
An Act to continue, until the Twenty fifth Day of March One thousand eight hundred and fifteen, an Act of the Forty fourth Year of His present Majesty, (Note: Restriction on Cash Payments Act 1803 (44 Geo. 3. c. 1)) to continue the Restrictions contained in several Acts of His present Majesty on Payments of Cash by the Bank of England. (Repealed by Statute Law Revision Act 1873 (36 & 37 Vict. c. 91))
Exportation (No. 2) Act 1814 (repealed)	54 Geo. 3. c. 100	18 July 1814
An Act to repeal the Schedule annexed to an Act of the Forty seventh Year of His present Majesty, by which the Drawbacks and Bounties on Sugars exported from Ireland are to be ascertained, and to substitute another Schedule in lieu thereof; and to permit the Importation into Ireland of Sugar, Coffee and other Articles, the Produce of Martinique, Mariegalante, Guadaloupe, Saint Eustatia, Saint Martin and Saba, under the same Duties and Regulations, as similar Articles of the British Plantations; to continue until the Fifth Day of April One thousand eight hundred and fifteen. (Repealed by Statute Law Revision Act 1873 (36 & 37 Vict. c. 91))
Child Stealing Act 1814 (repealed)	54 Geo. 3. c. 101	18 July 1814
An Act for the more effectual Prevention of Child Stealing. (Repealed for England and Wales by Offences Against the Person Act 1828 (9 Geo. 4. c. 31), for Ireland by Offences Against the Person (Ireland) Act 1829 (10 Geo. 4. c. 34) and for India by Criminal Law (India) Act 1828 (9 Geo. 4. c. 74))
British White Herring Fishery Act 1814 (repealed)	54 Geo. 3. c. 102	18 July 1814
An Act to continue, until the End of the next Session of Parliament, several Acts relating to the British White Herring Fishery. (Repealed by Sea Fisheries Act 1868 (31 & 32 Vict. c. 45))
Customs (No. 7) Act 1814 (repealed)	54 Geo. 3. c. 103	18 July 1814
An Act to grant until the Tenth Day of April One thousand eight hundred and nineteen, certain Duties on Goods, Wares and Merchandize imported into Ireland from any Port or Place within the Limits of the Charter granted to the United Company of Merchants of England trading to the East Indies; (Note: The United Company of Merchants of England trading to the East Indies is better known as the East India Company.) and to establish further Regulations for the better Security of the Revenue on Goods so imported. (Repealed by Customs Law Repeal Act 1825 (6 Geo. 4. c. 105))
Military Roads, etc. (Scotland) Act 1814 (repealed)	54 Geo. 3. c. 104	18 July 1814
An Act for maintaining and keeping in Repair certain Roads and Bridges made in Scotland, for the Purpose of Military Communication; and for making more effectual Provision for maintaining and repairing Roads made, and Bridges built, in Scotland, under the Authority of the Parliamentary Commissioners for Highland Roads and Bridges. (Repealed by Highland Roads (Scotland) Act 1819 (59 Geo. 3. c. 135) (Note: Incorrectly cited as "49 Geo. 3. c. 135" in the Chronological Table of the Statutes.))
Duties, etc., India Act 1814 (repealed)	54 Geo. 3. c. 105	23 July 1814
An Act to remove Doubts as to the Duties and Taxes heretofore imposed and levied under the Authority of the several Governments in the East Indies. (Repealed by Statute Law Revision Act 1873 (36 & 37 Vict. c. 91))
Drawbacks on Paper Act 1814 (repealed)	54 Geo. 3. c. 106	23 July 1814
An Act to remove Doubts, as to the Allowance of Drawbacks upon Bibles and Books of Prayer to The King's Printers, under an Act passed in the Thirty fourth Year of His present Majesty. (Note: Paper Duties Act 1794 (34 Geo. 3. c. 20)) (Repealed by Duties on Paper Act 1839 (2 & 3 Vict. c. 23))
Poor Apprentices, etc. Act 1814 (repealed)	54 Geo. 3. c. 107	23 July 1814
An Act to render valid certain Indentures for the binding of Parish Apprentices, and Certificates of the Settlement of Poor Persons. (Repealed by Statute Law Revision Act 1873 (36 & 37 Vict. c. 91))
Burying in Woollen Act 1814 (repealed)	54 Geo. 3. c. 108	23 July 1814
An Act to repeal Two Acts of the Thirtieth (Note: Burying in Woollen Act 1678 (30 Cha. 2. c. 3)) and Thirty second (Note: Burying in Woollen Act 1680 (32 Cha. 2. c. 1)) Years of King Charles the Second, for burying in Woollen, and for indemnifying Persons against Penalties for Offences committed against the said Acts. (Repealed by Statute Law Revision Act 1873 (36 & 37 Vict. c. 91))
Highways (England) Act 1814 (repealed)	54 Geo. 3. c. 109	23 July 1814
An Act to amend an Act of the Thirteenth Year of His present Majesty, (Note: Highways Act 1773 (13 Geo. 3. c. 78)) to explain, amend and reduce into One Act, the Statutes now in force for the Amendment and Preservation of the Public Highways within England; and for other Purposes. (Repealed by Highway Act 1835 (5 & 6 Will. 4. c. 50))
Greenwich Hospital Act 1814 (repealed)	54 Geo. 3. c. 110	23 July 1814
An Act to prevent the Embezzlement of certain Property belonging to the Hospital for Seamen at Greenwich, and to amend so much of an Act of the Parliament of Ireland of the Thirty third Year of His present Majesty (Note: Seamen's Wages Remittance Act 1793 (33 Geo. 3. c. 23 (I))) as relates to Payments to Out Pensioners of the said Hospital residing in Ireland. (Repealed by Greenwich Hospital Outpensions, etc. Act 1829 (10 Geo. 4. c. 26))
Importation etc. Act 1814 (repealed)	54 Geo. 3. c. 111	23 July 1814
An Act to continue certain Acts of the Parliament of Ireland for preventing the Importation of Arms, Gunpowder and Ammunition; and the making, removing, selling and keeping of Gunpowder, Arms and Ammunition, without Licence. (Repealed by Statute Law Revision Act 1873 (36 & 37 Vict. c. 91))
Hospitals (Ireland) Act 1814 (repealed)	54 Geo. 3. c. 112	23 July 1814
An Act for the further Encouragement of Fever Hospitals in Ireland. (Repealed by Statute Law Revision Act 1873 (36 & 37 Vict. c. 91))
Dublin Site of Record Office Act 1814 (repealed)	54 Geo. 3. c. 113	23 July 1814
An Act to vest in His Majesty, his Heirs and Successors, for ever, Part of the Ground and Buildings now belonging to the Society of King's Inns, Dublin, for the erecting thereon a Repository for Public Records in Ireland. (Repealed by Statute Law (Repeals) Act 2013 (c. 2))
Insolvent Debtors (Ireland) Act 1814 (repealed)	54 Geo. 3. c. 114	23 July 1814
An Act to amend an Act, made in the last Session of Parliament, (Note: Insolvent Debtors (Ireland) Act 1813 (53 Geo. 3. c. 138)) for the Relief of Insolvent Debtors in Ireland. (Repealed by Statute Law Revision Act 1873 (36 & 37 Vict. c. 91))
Burning of Land (Ireland) Act 1814 (repealed)	54 Geo. 3. c. 115	23 July 1814
An Act to amend an Act of the Parliament of Ireland, (Note: Burning of Land Act 1743 (17 Geo. 2. c. 10 (I))) for preventing the pernicious Practice of burning Land; and for the more effectual destroying of Vermin. (Repealed by Statute Law Revision Act 1873 (36 & 37 Vict. c. 91))
Recovery of Wages (Ireland) Act 1814 (repealed)	54 Geo. 3. c. 116	23 July 1814
An Act to repeal the several laws for Recovery of small Sums due for Wages in Ireland, and to make other Provisions for Recovery of such Wages. (Repealed by Summary Jurisdiction (Ireland) Act 1850 (13 & 14 Vict. c. 102))
Church Building (Ireland) Act 1814 (repealed)	54 Geo. 3. c. 117	23 July 1814
An Act to extend, so far as relates to the building of new Churches, an Act of the Parliament of Ireland, passed in the Thirty third Year of the Reign of His late Majesty King George the Second, (Note: Parish Clerks and Churches Act 1759 (33 Geo. 2. c. 11 (I))) intituled "An Act for reviving and amending an Act passed in the Twenty third Year of His present Majesty's Reign, (Note: Recovery of Tithes and Parish Clerks Act 1749 (23 Geo. 2. c. 12 (I))) intituled 'An Act for amending, continuing, and making more effectual the several Acts now in force in the Kingdom for the more easy Recovery of Tithes and other Ecclesiastical Dues of small Value; and also for the more easy providing a Maintenance for Parish Clerks,' so far only as the same relates to the more easy providing a Maintenance for Parish Clerks; and to encourage the building of new Churches." (Repealed by Church of Ireland Acts Repeal Act 1851 (14 & 15 Vict. c. 71))
Stamps (Ireland) Act 1814 (repealed)	54 Geo. 3. c. 118	23 July 1814
An Act to grant to His Majesty certain Stamp Duties in Ireland, and to explain and amend an Act made in the Fifty second Year of His Majesty's Reign (Note: Stamp Duties, etc. (Ireland) Act 1812 (52 Geo. 3. c. 87)) for granting Stamp Duties in Ireland. (Repealed by Stamps (Ireland) (No. 4) Act 1815 (55 Geo. 3. c. 81))
Postage Act 1814 (repealed)	54 Geo. 3. c. 119	23 July 1814
An Act to repeal certain Duties upon Letters and Packets, sent by the Post within Ireland; and to grant other Duties in lieu thereof. (Repealed by Post Office (Repeal of Laws) Act 1837 (7 Will. 4 & 1 Vict. c. 32))
Customs and Excise Act 1814 (repealed)	54 Geo. 3. c. 120	23 July 1814
An Act to amend several Acts relating to the Revenues, Matters and Things under the Management of the Commissioners of Customs and Port Duties, and of the Commissioners of Inland Excise and Taxes in Ireland. (Repealed by Statute Law Revision Act 1861 (24 & 25 Vict. c. 101))
Customs and Excise (No. 2) Act 1814 (repealed)	54 Geo. 3. c. 121	23 July 1814
An Act to repeal the additional Duties of Excise on French Wine imported and on Spirits exported from the Warehouses; and authorizing the Repayment of the additional Duty in respect of French Wine found in Dealers' Stocks; and authorizing the Commissioners of Excise Duties to repay or remit Duties paid on Liquors lost by accidental Staving before Landing. (Repealed by Statute Law Revision Act 1861 (24 & 25 Vict. c. 101))
Customs (No. 8) Act 1814 (repealed)	54 Geo. 3. c. 122	23 July 1814
An Act to alter the Mode of declaring the Value of Goods imported into or exported from Great Britain. (Repealed by Customs Law Repeal Act 1825 (6 Geo. 4. c. 105))
Hop Trade Act 1814 (repealed)	54 Geo. 3. c. 123	23 July 1814
An Act to amend an Act of the Thirty ninth and Fortieth Year of His present Majesty, (Note: Hop Trade Act 1800 (39 & 40 Geo. 3. c. 81)) to prevent Frauds and Abuses in the Trade of Hops. (Repealed by Hops Certification Regulations 1979 (SI 1979/1095))
Importation (No. 2) Act 1814 (repealed)	54 Geo. 3. c. 124	23 July 1814
An Act to permit the Importation of Tobacco and Snuff into the Port of Plymouth. (Repealed by Statute Law Revision Act 1861 (24 & 25 Vict. c. 101))
Importation (No. 3) Act 1814 (repealed)	54 Geo. 3. c. 125	23 July 1814
An Act to continue, until the End of the next Session of Parliament, an Act made in the Forty sixth Year of His present Majesty, (Note: Importation (No. 4) Act 1806 (46 Geo. 3. c. 117)) for permitting the Importation of Masts, Yards, Bowsprits, and Timber, for Naval Purposes, from the British Colonies in North America. (Repealed by Statute Law Revision Act 1873 (36 & 37 Vict. c. 91))
Relief of Shipwrecked Mariners, etc. Act 1814 (repealed)	54 Geo. 3. c. 126	23 July 1814
An Act to alter and extend an Act passed in the Eighth Year of King George the First (Note: Shipwrecked Mariners Act 1721 (8 Geo. 1. c. 17)) for Relief of shipwrecked Mariners and distressed Persons, being His Majesty's Subjects, in the Kingdom of Portugal. (Repealed by Consular Advances Act 1825 (6 Geo. 4. c. 87))
Exportation (No. 3) Act 1814 (repealed)	54 Geo. 3. c. 127	23 July 1814
An Act to permit the Exportation to Foreign Parts from Scotland and Ireland of Linen Cloth, without Stamps. (Repealed by Statute Law Revision Act 1873 (36 & 37 Vict. c. 91))
Dublin Foundling Hospital Act 1814 (repealed)	54 Geo. 3. c. 128	23 July 1814
An Act to amend the several Acts for regulating the Foundling Hospital in Dublin. (Repealed by Statute Law (Repeals) Act 2013 (c. 2))
Importation and Exportation (No. 2) Act 1814 (repealed)	54 Geo. 3. c. 129	25 July 1814
An Act to grant to His Majesty Rates and Duties, and to allow Drawbacks and Bounties on certain Goods, Wares and Merchandize imported into and exported from Ireland, in lieu of former Rates and Duties, Drawbacks and Bounties. (Repealed by Customs Law Repeal Act 1825 (6 Geo. 4. c. 105))
Restriction on Cash Payments (No. 2) Act 1814 (repealed)	54 Geo. 3. c. 130	25 July 1814
An Act to continue, until Three Months after the ceasing of any Restriction imposed on the Bank of England from issuing Cash in Payment, the several Acts for confirming and continuing the Restrictions on Payments in Cash by the Bank of Ireland. (Repealed by Statute Law Revision Act 1873 (36 & 37 Vict. c. 91))
Appointment of Superintending Magistrates, etc. Act 1814 (repealed)	54 Geo. 3. c. 131	25 July 1814
An Act to provide for the better Execution of the Laws in Ireland, by appointing Superintending Magistrates and additional Constables in Counties, in certain cases. (Repealed by Constabulary (Ireland) Act 1836 (6 & 7 Will. 4. c. 13) and Civil Bill Courts (Ireland) Act 1851 (14 & 15 Vict. c. 57))
House Duty (Ireland) Act 1814 (repealed)	54 Geo. 3. c. 132	25 July 1814
An Act to repeal the Duty payable in Ireland on certain Houses or Tenements under the annual Value of Ten Pounds. (Repealed by Statute Law Revision Act 1873 (36 & 37 Vict. c. 91))
Stamps (Great Britain) Act 1814 (repealed)	54 Geo. 3. c. 133	25 July 1814
An Act for better enabling the Commissioners of Stamps to make Allowances for spoiled Stamps on Policies of Insurance in Great Britain, and for preventing Frauds relating thereto. (Repealed by Customs and Inland Revenue Act 1867 (30 & 31 Vict. c. 23))
East India Trade, etc. Act 1814 (repealed)	54 Geo. 3. c. 134	25 July 1814
An Act to continue, until the First Day of January One thousand eight hundred and sixteen, and to amend several Acts for allowing Importations from and Exportations to the Places within use Limits of the Charter of the East India Company, in Ships not of British Built; and for the better Maintenance and Care of Lascars and other Asiatic Seamen arriving in this Kingdom. (Repealed by Statute Law Revision Act 1873 (36 & 37 Vict. c. 91))
Highways (Ireland) Act 1814 (repealed)	54 Geo. 3. c. 135	25 July 1814
An Act to further explain and amend an Act of the Fiftieth Year of His present Majesty's Reign, (Note: Stage Coaches, etc. (Ireland) Act 1810 (50 Geo. 3. c. 32)) for repealing certain Parts of several Acts, relating to the limiting the Number of Persons to be carried by Stage Coaches in Ireland. (Repealed by Statute Law Revision Act 1873 (36 & 37 Vict. c. 91))
Northern Lighthouse Commissioners Act 1814 (repealed)	54 Geo. 3. c. 136	25 July 1814
An Act for enabling the Commissioners of the Northern Lighthouses to purchase the Island and Light of May, at the Entrance of the Frith of Forth; for enabling the Commissioners of the Treasury to advance a certain Sum of Money towards that Purpose; and for amending several Acts in regard to the Northern Lighthouses. (Repealed by Merchant Shipping Repeal Act 1854 (17 & 18 Vict. c. 120))
Payment of Creditors (Scotland) Act 1814 (repealed)	54 Geo. 3. c. 137	25 July 1814
An Act for rendering the Payment of Creditors more equal and expeditious in Scotland. (Repealed by Bankruptcy (Scotland) Act 1856 (19 & 20 Vict. c. 79))
Queensferry, Firth of Forth (Finance) Act 1814	54 Geo. 3. c. 138	25 July 1814
An Act to enable the Trustees appointed by an Act of the Forty ninth Year of His present Majesty, (Note: Queensferry Ferry Improvement Act 1809 (49 Geo. 3. c. lxxxiii)) for the Improvement of the Passage across the Frith of Forth, called The Queensferry, to carry the same into Execution.
National Debt (No. 3) Act 1814 (repealed)	54 Geo. 3. c. 139	27 July 1814
An Act to rectify a Mistake in an Act of this Session of Parliament, (Note: National Debt Act 1814 (54 Geo. 3. c. 76)) for raising the Sum of Twenty four Millions by way of Annuities. (Repealed by Statute Law Revision Act 1870 (33 & 34 Vict. c. 69))
National Debt (No. 4) Act 1814 (repealed)	54 Geo. 3. c. 140	27 July 1814
An Act to amend several Acts of the Parliament of Ireland for granting certain Annuities. (Repealed by Statute Law Revision Act 1870 (33 & 34 Vict. c. 69))
Duties on Killing Game Act 1814 (repealed)	54 Geo. 3. c. 141	27 July 1814
An Act to alter so much of an Act made in the Fifty second Year of His present Majesty, (Note: Assessed Taxes Act 1812 (52 Geo. 3. c. 93)) as relates to the Duties payable in respect of killing of Game. (Repealed by Revenue Act 1869 (32 & 33 Vict. c. 14))
Exportation (No. 4) Act 1814 (repealed)	54 Geo. 3. c. 142	27 July 1814
An Act to permit the Exportation of Tea to the British Colonies in America, Guernsey, Jersey, Europe and Africa, without Payment of Duty. (Repealed by Statute Law Revision Act 1861 (24 & 25 Vict. c. 101))
Isle of Man Harbours Act 1814 (repealed)	54 Geo. 3. c. 143	27 July 1814
An Act to repeal the Duties granted by an Act passed in the Eleventh Year of His present Majesty, (Note: Isle of Man Harbours Act 1771 (11 Geo. 3. c. 52)) for repairing, amending and supporting the several Harbours and Sea Ports in the Isle of Man, and for granting new Duties in lieu thereof, and for giving further Powers to the Commissioners appointed under the said Act. (Repealed by Isle of Man Harbours Act 1872 (35 & 36 Vict. c. 23))
Stamps Act 1814 (repealed)	54 Geo. 3. c. 144	27 July 1814
An Act for better securing the Stamp Duties on Sea Insurances made in London, and for altering the Period for taking out Stamp Office Certificates by Attornies and others in England. (Repealed by Inland Revenue Repeal Act 1870 (33 & 34 Vict. c. 99))
Corruption of Blood Act 1814 (repealed)	54 Geo. 3. c. 145	27 July 1814
An Act to take away Corruption of Blood save in certain Cases. (Repealed by Statute Law Revision Act 1960 (8 & 9 Eliz. 2. c. 56))
Treason Act 1814	54 Geo. 3. c. 146	27 July 1814
An Act to alter the Punishment in certain Cases of High Treason.
Hackney Coaches Act 1814 (repealed)	54 Geo. 3. c. 147	28 July 1814
An Act for the better Regulation of the Drivers of Licenced Hackney Coaches; for explaining and amending an Act passed in the Forty eighth Year of His present Majesty, (Note: Hackney Coach Fares Act 1808 (48 Geo. 3. c. 87)) relating to Hackney Coaches; and for authorising the licensing of a limited Number of Hackney Chariots. (Repealed by Hackney Carriages Act 1815 (55 Geo. 3. c. 159) and London Hackney Carriage Act 1831 (1 & 2 Will. 4. c. 22))
Excise (No. 2) Act 1814 (repealed)	54 Geo. 3. c. 148	28 July 1814
An Act for imposing an Excise Duty on Silk Handkerchiefs sold by the East India Company for Home Consumption. (Repealed by Duty on Silk Handkerchiefs Act 1815 (55 Geo. 3. c. 93))
Spirit Trade Act 1814 (repealed)	54 Geo. 3. c. 149	28 July 1814
An Act to regulate, until the End of the next Session of Parliament, the Trade in Spirits between Great Britain and Ireland reciprocally. (Repealed by Statute Law Revision Act 1873 (36 & 37 Vict. c. 91))
Distillation of Spirits (Ireland) Act 1814 (repealed)	54 Geo. 3. c. 150	28 July 1814
An Act to consolidate and amend the Regulations contained In several Acts of Parliament, for imposing and levying of Fines upon Parishes, Townlands and other Places, in respect of the unlawful Distillation of Spirits in Ireland. (Repealed by Illicit Distillation (Ireland) Act 1831 (1 & 2 Will. 4. c. 55))
Office of Agent General for Volunteers, etc. Act 1814 (repealed)	54 Geo. 3. c. 151	28 July 1814
An Act to repeal an Act passed in the Fifty second Tear of His present Majesty (Note: Agent General for Volunteers, etc. Act 1812 (52 Geo. 3. c. 152)) for better regulating the Office of Agent General for Volunteers and Local Militia, and for the more effectually regulating the said Office; and to make further Provisions for the Regulation of the Office of Agent General. (Repealed by Paymaster General Act 1817 (57 Geo. 3. c. 41))
Carriage of Gunpowder (Great Britain) Act 1814 (repealed)	54 Geo. 3. c. 152	28 July 1814
An Act to repeal certain Parts of an Act made in the Twelfth Year of the Reign of His present Majesty, (Note: Gunpowder Act 1772 (12 Geo. 3. c. 61)) for regulating the Making, Keeping and Carriage of Gunpowder, within Great Britain. (Repealed by Statute Law Revision Act 1873 (36 & 37 Vict. c. 91))
Drawback on Paper Act 1814 (repealed)	54 Geo. 3. c. 153	28 July 1814
An Act to regulate the Payment of Drawback on Paper allowed to the Universities in Scotland. (Repealed by Duties on Paper Act 1839 (2 & 3 Vict. c. 23))
Improvement at Westminster Act 1814	54 Geo. 3. c. 154	28 July 1814
An Act for further amending and enlarging the Powers of an Act of the Forty sixth Year of His present Majesty, intituled "An Act for consolidating and rendering more effectual the several Acts for the Purchase of Buildings, and further Improvement of the Streets and Places near to Westminster Hall and the Two Houses of Parliament;" (Note: Houses of Parliament Act 1806 (46 Geo. 3. c. 89)) and for other Purposes therein mentioned.
Aliens Act 1814 (repealed)	54 Geo. 3. c. 155	29 July 1814
An Act to repeal an Act (Note: Aliens Act 1803 (43 Geo. 3. c. 155)) for establishing Regulations respecting Aliens arriving in or resident in this Kingdom, in certain cases; and for substituting other Provisions, until the End of the next Session of Parliament, in lieu thereof. (Repealed by Aliens Act 1815 (55 Geo. 3. c. 54))
Copyright Act 1814 (repealed)	54 Geo. 3. c. 156	29 July 1814
An Act to amend the several Acts for the Encouragement of Learning, by securing the Copies and Copyright of Printed Books, to the Authors of such Books or their Assigns. (Repealed by Copyright Act 1842 (5 & 6 Vict. c. 45))
Office of Works Act 1814 (repealed)	54 Geo. 3. c. 157	29 July 1814
An Act for the better Regulation of the Conduct of the Business of the Office of Works, and the Expenditure thereof. (Repealed by Statute Law Revision Act 1873 (36 & 37 Vict. c. 91))
Incitement to Mutiny Act 1814 (repealed)	54 Geo. 3. c. 158	29 July 1814
An Act to continue, for One Year, certain Acts for the better Prevention and Punishment of Attempts to seduce Persons serving in His Majesty's Forces by Sea or Land from their Duty and Allegiance to His Majesty, or to incite them to Mutiny or Disobedience. (Repealed by Statute Law Revision Act 1873 (36 & 37 Vict. c. 91))
Harbours Act 1814 (repealed)	54 Geo. 3. c. 159	29 July 1814
An Act for the better Regulation of the several Ports, Harbours, Roadsteads, Sounds, Channels, Bays and Navigable Rivers, in the United Kingdom; and of His Majesty's Docks, Dock Yards, Arsenals, Wharfs, Moorings and Stores therein; and for repealing several Acts passed for that Purpose. (Repealed by Statute Law (Repeals) Act 1981 (c. 19))
Annuity to Princess of Wales Act 1814 (repealed)	54 Geo. 3. c. 160	29 July 1814
An Act, to enable His Majesty to settle an Annuity upon Her Royal Highness the Princess of Wales, during the joint Lives of His Majesty and of Her Royal Highness. (Repealed by Statute Law Revision Act 1873 (36 & 37 Vict. c. 91))
Annuity, etc., to Duke of Wellington Act 1814 (repealed)	54 Geo. 3. c. 161	29 July 1814
An Act for settling and securing an Annuity on Arthur Duke of Wellington and his Heirs; and for empowering the Lord High Treasurer or Lords Commissioners of the Treasury to advance, out of the Consolidated Fund of Great Britain, a Sum of Money in lieu of such Annuity, to purchase an Estate in order to accompany the said Title, in consideration of the eminent and signal Services performed by the said Duke of Wellington to His Majesty and to the Public; and for making further Provision for the Disposal of a Sum of Money granted by an Act of the last Session of Parliament for purchasing an Estate for the said Duke, then Marquis of Wellington. (Repealed by Wellington Estate Act 1972 (c. 1))
Annuity to Lord Beresford, etc. Act 1814 (repealed)	54 Geo. 3. c. 162	29 July 1814
An Act for settling and securing an Annuity on Lord Beresford, and the Persons to whom the Title of Lord Beresford shall descend, in Consideration of his eminent Services. (Repealed by Statute Law Revision Act 1873 (36 & 37 Vict. c. 91))
Annuity to Lord Combermere, etc. Act 1814 (repealed)	54 Geo. 3. c. 163	29 July 1814
An Act for settling and securing an Annuity on Lord Combermere, and the Two next Persons to whom the Title of Lord Combermere shall descend, in Consideration of his eminent Services. (Repealed by Statute Law Revision Act 1953 (2 & 3 Eliz. 2. c. 5))
Annuity to Lord Exmouth Act 1814 (repealed)	54 Geo. 3. c. 164	29 July 1814
An Act for settling and securing an Annuity on Lord Exmouth, and the Persons to whom the Title of Lord Exmouth shall descend, in Consideration of his eminent Services. (Repealed by Statute Law Revision (No. 2) Act 1893 (56 & 57 Vict. c. 54))
Annuity to Lord Hill Act 1814 (repealed)	54 Geo. 3. c. 165	29 July 1814
An Act for settling and securing an Annuity on Lord Hill, and the Persons to whom the Title of Lord Hill shall descend, in Consideration of his eminent Services. (Repealed by Statute Law Revision Act 1873 (36 & 37 Vict. c. 91))
Annuity to Lord Lynedoch Act 1814 (repealed)	54 Geo. 3. c. 166	29 July 1814
An Act for settling and securing an Annuity on Lord Lynedoch, and the Persons to whom the Title of Lord Lynedoch shall descend, in Consideration of his eminent Services. (Repealed by Statute Law Revision Act 1873 (36 & 37 Vict. c. 91))
Appropriation Act 1814 (repealed)	54 Geo. 3. c. 167	29 July 1814
An Act for applying a certain Sum of Money arisen or to arise from certain Duties granted to His Majesty during the Continuance of the present War, and for applying certain Monies therein mentioned for the Service of the Year One thousand eight hundred and fourteen; and for further appropriating the Supplies granted in this Session of Parliament. (Repealed by Statute Law Revision Act 1873 (36 & 37 Vict. c. 91))
Informal Attestation of Certain Deeds Act 1814 (repealed)	54 Geo. 3. c. 168	30 July 1814
An Act to amend the Laws respecting the Attestation of Instruments of Appointment and Revocation, made in exercise of certain Powers in Deeds, Wills and other Instruments. (Repealed by Statute Law Revision Act 1873 (36 & 37 Vict. c. 91))
Postage (No. 2) Act 1814 (repealed)	54 Geo. 3. c. 169	30 July 1814
An Act for making certain Regulations respecting the Postage of Ship Letters, and of Letters in Great Britain. (Repealed by Post Office (Repeal of Laws) Act 1837 (7 Will. 4 & 1 Vict. c. 32))
Poor Relief Act 1814 (repealed)	54 Geo. 3. c. 170	30 July 1814
An Act to repeal certain Provisions in Local Acts, for the Maintenance and Regulation of the Poor; and to make other Provisions in relation thereto. (Repealed by Statute Law (Repeals) Act 1971 (c. 52))
Customs, etc. Act 1814 (repealed)	54 Geo. 3. c. 171	30 July 1814
An Act to empower the Commissioners of His Majesty's Treasury to restore Seizures; or remit or mitigate Fines, Penalties or Forfeitures, incurred concerning any Laws relating to the Customs or Excise, or Navigation and Trade of Great Britain. (Repealed by Statute Law Revision Act 1873 (36 & 37 Vict. c. 91))
Duties on Spirits (Scotland) Act 1814 (repealed)	54 Geo. 3. c. 172	30 July 1814
An Act for repealing the Duties payable in Scotland upon Distillers' Wash, Spirits and Licences, and for granting other Duties in lieu thereof. (Repealed by Statute Law Revision Act 1873 (36 & 37 Vict. c. 91))
Land Tax Redemption Act 1814 (repealed)	54 Geo. 3. c. 173	30 July 1814
An Act to alter and amend certain of the Powers and Provisions of several Acts passed for the Redemption and Sale of the Land Tax; and for making further Provision for the Redemption thereof. (Repealed by Finance Act 1963 (c. 25))
Post Horse Duties, etc. (Great Britain) Act 1814 (repealed)	54 Geo. 3. c. 174	30 July 1814
An Act for letting to Farm the Post Horse Duties. (Repealed by Statute Law Revision Act 1861 (24 & 25 Vict. c. 101))
Residence on Benefices, etc. (England) Act 1814 (repealed)	54 Geo. 3. c. 175	30 July 1814
An Act to explain and amend several Acts relating to Spiritual Persons holding of Farms; and for enforcing the Residence of such Persons on their Benefices, in England, for One Year, and from thence until Six Weeks after the Meeting of the then next Session of Parliament. (Repealed by Statute Law Revision Act 1873 (36 & 37 Vict. c. 91))
Local Militia Pay (Great Britain) Act 1814 (repealed)	54 Geo. 3. c. 176	30 July 1814
An Act for defraying the Charge of the Pay and Clothing of the Local Militia in Great Britain, for the Tear One thousand eight hundred and fourteen. (Repealed by Statute Law Revision Act 1873 (36 & 37 Vict. c. 91))
Militia Pay (Ireland) Act 1814 (repealed)	54 Geo. 3. c. 177	30 July 1814
An Act for defraying the Charge of the Pay and Clothing of the Militia of Ireland; and for making Allowances in certain Cases to Subaltern Officers of the said Militia during Peace. (Repealed by Statute Law Revision Act 1873 (36 & 37 Vict. c. 91))
Yeomanry Corps, etc. (Ireland) Act 1814 (repealed)	54 Geo. 3. c. 178	30 July 1814
An Act to continue so much of an Act made in the Forty third Tear of His present Majesty's Reign, (Note: Yeomanry and Volunteer Cavalry Act 1803 (43 Geo. 3. c. 121)) for authorizing the billetting and subjecting to Military Discipline, certain Yeomanry Corps and Officers of Cavalry or Infantry, as relates to such Corps in Ireland. (Repealed by Statute Law Revision Act 1873 (36 & 37 Vict. c. 91))
Militia (Ireland) Act 1814 (repealed)	54 Geo. 3. c. 179	30 July 1814
An Act to amend an Act, passed in the Forty ninth Year of His present Majesty's Reign, intituled "An Act for amending and reducing into One Act of Parliament the several Laws for raising and training the Militia of Ireland." (Note: Militia (Ireland) Act 1809 (49 Geo. 3. c. 120)) (Repealed by Militia (Voluntary Enlistment) Act 1875 (38 & 39 Vict. c. 69))
Unlawful Combinations (Ireland) Act 1814 or the Peace Preservation Act 1814 (repealed)	54 Geo. 3. c. 180	30 July 1814
An Act to provide for the preserving and restoring of Peace in such Parts of Ireland as may at any time be disturbed by seditious Persons, or by Persons entering into unlawful Combinations or Conspiracies. (Repealed by Statute Law Revision Act 1873 (36 & 37 Vict. c. 91))
Assaults (Ireland) Act 1814 (repealed)	54 Geo. 3. c. 181	30 July 1814
An Act to render more easy and effectual Redress for Assaults in Ireland. (Repealed by Civil Bill Courts (Ireland) Act 1851 (14 & 15 Vict. c. 57))
Trade of Malta, etc. Act 1814 (repealed)	54 Geo. 3. c. 182	30 July 1814
An Act to continue, until the Twenty fifth Day of March One thousand eight hundred and sixteen, an Act (Note: Malta Act 1801 (41 Geo. 3. (U.K.) c. 103)) for regulating the Trade to the Isle of Malta; and to revive and continue for the same Period, several Acts relating to the Trade to the Cape of Good Hope; and to the bringing and landing certain Prize Goods in Great Britain. (Repealed by Statute Law Revision Act 1873 (36 & 37 Vict. c. 91))
Excise (No. 3) Act 1814 (repealed)	54 Geo. 3. c. 183	30 July 1814
An Act to impose a Countervailing Duty of Excise on Bleaching Powder imported from Ireland. (Repealed by Excise and Customs Act 1815 (55 Geo. 3. c. 66))
Accounts of Colonial Revenues Act 1814 (repealed)	54 Geo. 3. c. 184	30 July 1814
An Act for the effectual Examination of Accounts of the Receipt and Expenditure of the Colonial Revenues in the Islands of Ceylon, Mauritius, Malta, Trinidad, and in the Settlements of the Cape of Good Hope, for Five Years. (Repealed by Statute Law Revision Act 1873 (36 & 37 Vict. c. 91))
Exportation (No. 5) Act 1814 (repealed)	54 Geo. 3. c. 185	30 July 1814
An Act to allow a Bounty on the Exportation from Great Britain of British-made Cordage. (Repealed by Customs Law Repeal Act 1825 (6 Geo. 4. c. 105))
Apprehension of Offenders Act 1814 (repealed)	54 Geo. 3. c. 186	30 July 1814
An Act for the more easy apprehending and trying of Offenders, escaping from one Part of the United Kingdom to the other. (Repealed by Statute Law Revision Act 1873 (36 & 37 Vict. c. 91))
Depredations on the Thames Act 1814 (repealed)	54 Geo. 3. c. 187	30 July 1814
An Act to revive and continue, until the First Day of June One thousand eight hundred and twenty and to amend several Acts for the more effectual Prevention of Depredations on the River Thames, and its Vicinity. (Repealed by Police Magistrates, Metropolitan Act 1821 (1 & 2 Geo. 4. c. 118))
Exchequer Bills (No. 4) Act 1814 (repealed)	54 Geo. 3. c. 188	30 July 1814
An Act for enabling His Majesty to raise the Sum of Three Millions for the Service of Great Britain, and for applying the Sum of Two hundred thousand Pounds British Currency for the Service of Ireland. (Repealed by Statute Law Revision Act 1873 (36 & 37 Vict. c. 91))
Militia Pay (Great Britain) Act 1814 (repealed)	54 Geo. 3. c. 189	30 July 1814
An Act to defray the Charge of the Pay, Clothing and Contingent Expences of the Disembodied Militia in Great Britain, and of the Miners of Cornwall and Devon; and for granting Allowances in certain Cases to Subaltern Officers, Adjutants, Surgeons' Mates and Serjeant Majors of Militia, until the Twenty fifth Day of June One thousand eight hundred and fifteen. (Repealed by Statute Law Revision Act 1873 (36 & 37 Vict. c. 91))
Land Tax Act 1814 (repealed)	54 Geo. 3. c. 190	23 July 1814
An Act for appointing Commissioners for carrying into Execution an Act of this Session of Parliament, (Note: Duties on Malt, etc. Act 1813 (54 Geo. 3. c. 2)) for granting to His Majesty a Duty on Pensions and Offices in England; and an Act made in the Thirty eighth Year of His present Majesty, (Note: Land Tax Act 1797 (38 Geo. 3. c. 5)) for granting an Aid to His Majesty by a Land Tax, to be raised in Great Britain, for the Service of the Year One thousand seven hundred and ninety eight. (Repealed by Statute Law Revision Act 1873 (36 & 37 Vict. c. 91))

=== Local acts ===
Short title	Citation	Royal assent
Long title
Solihull, Kenilworth and Stonebridge Road Act 1814	54 Geo. 3. c. xv	29 March 1814
An Act for enlarging the Term and Powers of Two Acts of His present Majesty, (Note: Warwick Roads Act 1772 (12 Geo. 3. c. 91)) (Note: Warwick Roads (No. 2) Act 1794 (34 Geo. 3. c. 116)) for repairing the Road from the Warwick Road near Solihull to the Guide Post in Kenilworth, and from Stonebridge, to meet the aforesaid Road at Balsall Common, in the County of Warwick, so far as respects the said Road from Stonebridge to Balsall Common, and from thence to the said Town of Kenilworth.
Woodbridge and Eye Road Act 1814 (repealed)	54 Geo. 3. c. xvi	19 April 1814
An Act for enlarging the Term and Powers of an Act of His present Majesty, (Note: Woodbridge and Eye Road Act 1802 (42 Geo. 3. c. viii)) for repairing the Road from Woodbridge to Eye, in the County of Suffolk; and for repairing certain other Roads to communicate therewith. (Repealed by Statute Law (Repeals) Act 2008 (c. 12))
Roads from Cardington and from Roxton Hill Act 1814	54 Geo. 3. c. xvii	4 May 1814
An Act for enlarging the Term and Powers of Two Acts, passed in the Twelfth (Note: Bedford Roads (No. 2) Act 1772 (12 Geo. 3. c. 107)) and Thirty third (Note: Bedford Roads Act 1793 (33 Geo. 3. c. 178)) Years of His present Majesty, for repairing the Road from the Parish of Cardington to the great Northern Road near Temsford Bridge in the County of Bedford; and for making and maintaining a Road branching out of the same at Roxton Hill, to the South End of the Turnpike Road leading from Bedford to Kimbolton, in the County of Huntingdon.
Ashford and Maidstone Road Act 1814 (repealed)	54 Geo. 3. c. xviii	4 May 1814
An Act for repairing the Road from Barrow Hill in Ashford, to a Place called New England, in the Parish of Hollingborne, and for making a new Road thence to East Lane, in the Town of Maidstone, all in the County of Kent. (Repealed by Ashford and Maidstone Road Act 1836 (6 & 7 Will. 4. c. l))
Cockerton Bridge and Staindrop Road Act 1814	54 Geo. 3. c. xix	4 May 1814
An Act for enlarging the Term and Powers of an Act of His present Majesty, (Note: Cockerton Bridge to Staindrop Road Act 1793 (33 Geo. 3. c. 146)) for repairing the Road from Cockerton Bridge to Staindrop, in the County of Durham.
Gosport Improvement Act 1814	54 Geo. 3. c. xx	4 May 1814
An Act for watching, lighting and cleansing the Town of Gosport in the County of Southampton; and for amending and rendering more effectual an Act paled in the Third Year of His present Majesty, (Note: Gosport Improvement Act 1763 (3 Geo. 3. c. 56)) for better paving the Streets and preventing Nuisances and Annoyances in the said Town.
South Molton Roads Act 1814 (repealed)	54 Geo. 3. c. xxi	4 May 1814
An Act for enlarging the Term and Powers of several Acts of His late and present Majesty, for repairing certain Roads leading from South Molton, in the County of Devon. (Repealed by Southmolton Roads (Devon) Act 1839 (2 & 3 Vict. c. xlix))
Road from Lyne Bridge Act 1814 (repealed)	54 Geo. 3. c. xxii	4 May 1814
An Act for enlarging the Term and Powers of an Act of His present Majesty, (Note: Cumberland Roads Act 1794 (34 Geo. 3. c. 143)) for repairing the Roads from Lyne Bridge, through Longtown, to the Scotch Dyke, and from Longtown to the Bridge over the River Sark, in the County of Cumberland, and for repairing certain other Roads to communicate therewith. (Repealed by Longtown Roads (Cumberland) Act 1830 (11 Geo. 4 & 1 Will. 4. c. ix))
Macclesfield Improvement Act 1814 (repealed)	54 Geo. 3. c. xxiii	4 May 1814
An Act for lighting, watching and regulating the Police within the Borough of Macclesfield, in the County of Chester. (Repealed by Macclesfield Improvement Act 1825 (6 Geo. 4. c. cxcvi))
Road from Burbage to Narborough Act 1814 (repealed)	54 Geo. 3. c. xxiv	4 May 1814
An Act for amending and widening the Road, commencing at or near the Side Gate on the Hinckley and Lutterworth Turnpike Road, in the Parish of Burbage, in the County of Leicester, to the Leicester Turnpike Road, in or near to the Village of Narborough, in the said County. (Repealed by Road from Burbage to Narborough Act 1835 (5 & 6 Will. 4. c. lxxxix))
Darlington and West Auckland Road Act 1814	54 Geo. 3. c. xxv	4 May 1814
An Act for enlarging the Term and Powers of an Act of His present Majesty, for repairing the Roads from Darlington to West Auckland, and several other Roads therein mentioned, in the County of Durham.
Road from Burlington to Llanymynech Act 1814	54 Geo. 3. c. xxvi	4 May 1814
An Act for enlarging the Term and Powers of Two Acts of His present Majesty (Note: Salop Roads Act 1772 (12 Geo. 3. c. 96)) (Note: Salop Roads Act 1792 (32 Geo. 3. c. 143)) for repairing the Road from Burlton, through Knockin, to Llanymynech, in the County of Salop, and other Places therein mentioned.
Ashford and Romney Marsh Road Act 1814	54 Geo. 3. c. xxvii	4 May 1814
An Act for enlarging the Term and Powers of an Act of His present Majesty, (Note: Kent Roads Act 1793 (33 Geo. 3. c. 162)) for repairing the Road from the North End of Marsh Lane in Ashford, in the County of Kent, to the End of the Parish of Orlestone, near Stockbridghe, in Romney Marsh, in the said County.
Roads from West Harptree to the Bath and Wells Turnpike Road Act 1814 (repealed)	54 Geo. 3. c. xxviii	4 May 1814
An Act for enlarging the Term and Powers of an Act of His present Majesty (Note: Somerset Roads Act 1793 (33 Geo. 3. c. 165)) for repairing the Roads from West Harptry to the Bath and Wells Turnpike Roads, and other Roads therein mentioned, in the County of Somerset; and for repairing certain other Roads to communicate therewith. (Repealed by West Harptree Road Act 1853 (16 & 17 Vict. c. clxii))
Turnpike Road between North Shields and Morpeth Castle Act 1814 (repealed)	54 Geo. 3. c. xxix	4 May 1814
An Act for making and maintaining a Road from the Turnpike Road between North Shields and Newcastle upon Tyne, to Morpeth Castle, and for making and maintaining Three several Branches of Road to communicate therewith; all lying in the Counties of Northumberland and Durham. (Repealed by North Shields and Morpeth Turnpike Road Act 1852 (15 & 16 Vict. c. lxxv))
Selby Ferry and Market Weighton Road Act 1814 (repealed)	54 Geo. 3. c. xxx	4 May 1814
An Act for continuing the Term and enlarging the Powers of an Act of the Thirty third Year of the Reign of His present Majesty, (Note: Hemingbrough to Market Weighton Road Act 1793 (33 Geo. 3. c. 159)) for repairing and widening the Road from Selby Ferry, in the Parish of Hemingbrough, to the Town of Market Weighton, in the East Riding of the County of York. (Repealed by Selby and Market Weighton Turnpike Road Act 1857 (20 & 21 Vict. c. lxv))
Middleton and Bowes Road Act 1814	54 Geo. 3. c. xxxi	4 May 1814
An Act for continuing and amending Three Acts, One of His late Majesty, (Note: Middleton and Bowes Road Act 1743 (17 Geo. 2. c. 22)) and Two of His present Majesty, (Note: Middleton and Bowes Road Act 1771 (11 Geo. 3. c. 63)) (Note: Middleton and Bowes Road Act 1792 (32 Geo. 3. c. 132)) for repairing the Road from Middleton Tyas Lane End to Bowes, in the North Riding of the County of York.
Newton Chapel (Manchester) Act 1814	54 Geo. 3. c. xxxii	4 May 1814
An Act for rebuilding the Chapel of Newton, in the Parish of Manchester, in the County Palatine of Lancaster.
Puttenham Inclosure Act 1814	54 Geo. 3. c. xxxiii	4 May 1814
An Act for inclosing Lands within the Parish of Puttenham, in the County of Hertford.
Bray Inclosure Act 1814	54 Geo. 3. c. xxxiv	4 May 1814
An Act for inclosing Lands in the Parish of Bray, in the County of Berks.
Bewaldeth Inclosure Act 1814	54 Geo. 3. c. xxxv	4 May 1814
An Act for inclosing Lands within the Manor of Bewaldeth, in the Parish of Torpenhow, in the County of Cumberland.
Hockwold-cum-Wilton Inclosure Act 1814	54 Geo. 3. c. xxxvi	4 May 1814
An Act for inclosing Lands in the Township of Hockwold cum Wilton, in the County of Norfolk.
Bewcastle Inclosure Act 1814	54 Geo. 3. c. xxxvii	4 May 1814
An Act for inclosing Highstone Common, in the Parish of Bewcastle, in the County of Cumberland.
Lowestoft Inclosure Act 1814	54 Geo. 3. c. xxxviii	4 May 1814
An Act for inclosing Lands in the Parish of Lowestoft, in the County of Suffolk.
Allonby in Bromfield Inclosure Act 1814	54 Geo. 3. c. xxxix	4 May 1814
An Act for inclosing Lands within the Manor of Allonby, in the Parish of Bromfield, in the County of Cumberland.
London Docks Act 1814 (repealed)	54 Geo. 3. c. xl	18 May 1814
An Act for enlarging and amending the Powers and Provisions of the several Acts for making the London Docks. (Repealed by London Docks Act 1828 (9 Geo. 4. c. cxvi))
St. George's Parish (Middlesex) Improvement Act 1814 (repealed)	54 Geo. 3. c. xli	18 May 1814
An Act for amending the Powers and Provisions relating to the Poor's Rates, of an Act of His present Majesty, (Note: St. George's Parish, Middlesex, Improvement Act 1806 (46 Geo. 3. c. lxxvii)) for maintaining the Poor, and cleansing the Streets, in the Parish of Saint George, in the County of Middlesex. (Repealed by London Government (Borough of Stepney) Order in Council 1901 (SR&O 1901/276))
Severn and Wye Valley Railway and Canal Company Act 1814	54 Geo. 3. c. xlii	18 May 1814
An Act for enabling the Severn and Wye Railway and Canal Company to raise a further Sum of Money for the Completion of their Works.
Lewisham Poor Relief and Parochial Rates Act 1814 (repealed)	54 Geo. 3. c. xliii	18 May 1814
An Act for the better Management and Relief of the Poor in the Parish of Lewisham, in the County of Kent, and for better assessing and collecting the Parochial Rates in the said Parish. (Repealed by London Government (Borough of Lewisham) Order in Council 1901 (SR&O 1901/218))
Forehoe Poor Relief Act 1814 (repealed)	54 Geo. 3. c. xliv	18 May 1814
An Act for amending and more effectually carrying into Execution the Purposes of certain Acts of the Sixteenth, (Note: Forehoe Poor Relief Act 1776 (16 Geo. 3. c. 9)) Twenty third (Note: Forehoe, Norfolk (Borrowing Powers of Guardians) Act 1783 (23 Geo. 3. c. 29)) and Twenty ninth (Note: Forehoe, Norfolk (Guardians' Borrowing Powers) Act 1789 (29 Geo. 3. c. 4)) Years of His present Majesty, for the better Relief and Employment of the Poor within the Hundred of Forehoe, in the County of Norfolk. (Repealed by Statute Law (Repeals) Act 2013 (c. 2))
Warwickshire Judges' Lodgings Act 1814 (repealed)	54 Geo. 3. c. xlv	18 May 1814
An Act for providing a convenient House, with suitable Accommodations, for His Majesty's Judges at the Assizes for the Court of Warwick. (Repealed by Statute Law (Repeals) Act 1995 (c. 44))
Birmingham Mining and Copper Company Act 1814	54 Geo. 3. c. xlvi	18 May 1814
An Act to enable The Birmingham Mining and Copper Company to sue and be sued in the Name of their Secretary.
Lobley Hill and Burtryford Road and Branches Act 1814 (repealed)	54 Geo. 3. c. xlvii	18 May 1814
An Act for continuing and amending an Act of the Thirty third Year of His present Majesty, (Note: Durham Roads Act 1793 (33 Geo. 3. c. 148)) for repairing the Road from the Turnpike Road between Gateshead and Hexham, near Lobley Hill, in the County of Durham, to Burtry Ford, in the Parish of Stanhope, in the same County, together with several Branches therefrom. (Repealed by Lobley Hill and Burtryford Roads (Durham) Act 1837 (7 Will. 4 & 1 Vict. c. xvi))
Roads from Swell Wold, Cheltenham and Winchcomb Act 1814 (repealed)	54 Geo. 3. c. xlviii	18 May 1814
An Act for enlarging the Term and Powers of an Act of His present Majesty, (Note: Gloucester Roads Act 1792 (32 Geo. 3. c. 146)) for amending, widening, altering and repairing the Road from Swell Wold to the Turnpike Road from Tewkesbury to Stow, in the County of Gloucester, and from the Parish of Cheltenham, in the said County of Gloucester, to Sedgborough, in the County of Worcester, and from the Town of Winchcomb, in the said County of Gloucester, to the said Turnpike Road from Tewkesbury to Stow. (Repealed by Roads from Swell Wold, Cheltenham and Winchcomb Act 1833 (3 & 4 Will. 4. c. xi))
Besselsleigh and Hungerford Road Act 1814 (repealed)	54 Geo. 3. c. xlix	18 May 1814
An Act to continue the Term and alter and enlarge the Powers of Three Acts of His present Majesty, (Note: Berkshire and Wiltshire Roads Act 1771 (11 Geo. 3. c. 97)) (Note: Berkshire Roads Act 1772 (12 Geo. 3. c. 104)) (Note: Berkshire and Wiltshire Roads Act 1781 (21 Geo. 3. c. 101)) for amending the Road from Besselsleigh, through Wantage, to Hungerford, in the County of Berks, and other Roads in the said Acts mentioned, in the said County, and in the County of Wilts. (Repealed by Besselsleigh Road Act 1858 (21 & 22 Vict. c. xlii))
Road from Swindon to Ramsbury Act 1814	54 Geo. 3. c. l	18 May 1814
An Act for making and maintaining a Turnpike Road from Swindon to or near Knighton Farm, in the Parish of Ramsbury, and from Liddington to the Road leading from Swindon to Marlborough, in the County of Wilts.
Sturry and Herne Bay Road Act 1814	54 Geo. 3. c. li	18 May 1814
An Act for amending, widening and keeping in Repair the Road leading from Sturry Street to Herne Bay, in the County of Kent.
Road from Brent Bridge to Plymouth Act 1814	54 Geo. 3. c. lii	18 May 1814
An Act for altering and enlarging the Term and Powers of Three Acts, (Note: Devon Roads Act 1757 (31 Geo. 2. c. 51)) (Note: Brent Bridge to Plymouth Road Act 1777 (17 Geo. 3. c. 81)) (Note: Brent Bridge and Plymouth Road Act 1800 (39 & 40 Geo. 3. c. vi)) made for repairing the High Road leading from Brent Bridge, in the County of Devon, to Gasking Gate, in or near the Borough of Plymouth, in the said County of Devon.
Roads through Lichfield Act 1814 (repealed)	54 Geo. 3. c. liii	18 May 1814
An Act to continue the Term, and alter and enlarge the Powers of an Act of the Twenty ninth Year of His present Majesty, (Note: Stafford and Warwick Roads Act 1789 (29 Geo. 3. c. 83)) for enlarging the Terms of several Acts for repairing the Roads from Coleshill, (Note: Coleshill, Warwickshire.) through the City of Lichfield, (Note: Lichfield, Staffordshire.) and the Town of Stone, (Note: Stone, Staffordshire.) to the End of the County of Stafford, (Note: Where the A51 crosses the Staffordshire/Cheshire border. 52°57′38″N 2°23′02″W) in the Road leading towards Chester, and several other Roads in the said Acts mentioned, in the Counties of Warwick and Stafford, and City and County of the City of Lichfield. (Repealed by Road from Coleshill through Lichfield, and Rugeley and Alrewas Road Act 1834 (4 & 5 Will. 4. c. xxviii))
Balderston and Walton-in-le-Dale Road Act 1814	54 Geo. 3. c. liv	18 May 1814
An Act for making and maintaining a Road from Balderston to Burscough Bridge in Walton in le Dale, in the County Palatine of Lancaster.
New Sleaford and Anwick Road and Tattershall Witham Bridge Act 1814 (repealed)	54 Geo. 3. c. lv	18 May 1814
An Act for continuing the Term, and altering and enlarging the Powers, of an Act of His present Majesty, (Note: Lincoln Roads Act 1793 (33 Geo. 3. c. 150)) for widening and maintaining the Road leading from the East Side of the Market Place in New Sleaford to and through the Town of Anwick, in the County of Lincoln; and other Roads therein mentioned, in the said County; and for building a Bridge over the Witham, at or near to Tattershall Ferry. (Repealed by Sleaford and Tattershall Road Act 1856 (19 & 20 Vict. c. xxviii))
Standedge and Oldham Road Act 1814 (repealed)	54 Geo. 3. c. lvi	18 May 1814
An Act for continuing and enlarging the Term and Powers of an Act (Note: Lancaster Roads Act 1792 (32 Geo. 3. c. 139)) for making a Road from Stand Edge within Saddleworth in the County of York, to or near Mump's Brook, in the Township of Oldham, in the Parish of Prestwich, in the County of Lancaster, and other Roads therein mentioned. (Repealed by Standedge and Oldham Road Act 1827 (7 & 8 Geo. 4. c. lxiv))
Maidstone and Sutton Valence Road Act 1814 (repealed)	54 Geo. 3. c. lvii	18 May 1814
An Act for repairing the Road from the Maidstone Turnpike Gate on the Loose Road, near Sutton Lane, in the Parish of Maidstone, to the King's Head Inn, in Sutton Valence, in the County of Kent; and for making and repairing other Roads therein mentioned in the said County. (Repealed by Maidstone and Newcastle (Kent) Road Act 1840 (3 & 4 Vict. c. lxxxiv))
Road from Crickhowell to Ross Act 1814 (repealed)	54 Geo. 3. c. lviii	18 May 1814
An Act for enlarging the Term and Powers of Two Acts of His present Majesty, (Note: Brecon Roads Act 1772 (12 Geo. 3. c. 105)) (Note: Brecon Roads Act 1793 (33 Geo. 3. c. 154)) for repairing, widening and altering the Road from Crickhowell, in the County of Brecon, to the Croft Hands beyond New Inn, in the Turnpike Road between the City of Hereford and Ross, and other Roads therein described. (Repealed by Ross and Abergavenny Road Act 1833 (3 & 4 Will. 4. c. lxi))
Hampton and Staines Road Act 1814	54 Geo. 3. c. lix	18 May 1814
An Act for continuing and amending Two Acts of His present Majesty, (Note: Hampton to Staines Road Act 1793 (13 Geo. 3. c. 105)) (Note: Hampton to Staines Road Act 1793 (33 Geo. 3. c. 135)) for repairing the Road from the Guide Post at the West End of the Town of Hampton, over Sunbury Common, to the Town of Staines, in the County of Middlesex.
Road from Burnley to Edenfield Chapel Act 1814	54 Geo. 3. c. lx	18 May 1814
An Act for amending, improving and keeping in Repair the Road from the Town of Burnley, in the County Palatine of Lancaster, to the Turnpike Road leading from Bury to Haslingden, at or near Edenfield Chapel, in the Township of Tottington Higher End, in the same County.
Roads in Staffordshire Act 1814 (repealed)	54 Geo. 3. c. lxi	18 May 1814
An Act to continue the Term, and alter and enlarge the Powers of an Act of His present Majesty, (Note: Stafford Roads Act 1792 (32 Geo. 3. c. 157)) for repairing the Road from Stone to Lane End, and to the Road between Leek and Sandon, on Meir Heath, and from thence to Blithe Bridge; and also from Meir to Trentham, and from thence to Stableford Bridge; and the Road from Walton to Eccleshall, in the County of Stafford. (Repealed by Trentham and Stone Roads Act 1843 (6 & 7 Vict. c. xxvi))
Lees (Yorkshire) and Hebden Bridge Road Act 1814	54 Geo. 3. c. lxii	18 May 1814
An Act for making and maintaining a Road from a Place called Lees, in the Parish of Bingley, to commence and branch off from the Road leading from Cross Roads Inn to Haworth, at the North East Corner of a certain Close of Land called The Highfield, to Hebden Bridge, in the Parish of Halifax, all in the West Riding of the County of York.
York Minster Yard Act 1814	54 Geo. 3. c. lxiii	18 May 1814
An Act for enlarging and improving The Minster Yard of the Cathedral and Metropolitical Church of Saint Peter, in York, and other Places adjacent thereto.
Hyett's Estate Act 1814	54 Geo. 3. c. lxiv	18 May 1814
An Act for vesting certain Estates devised by the Will of Benjamin Hyett Esquire, deceased, in Trustees, to be sold, and for laying out the Monies thence arising in the Purchase of other Estates, to be settled to the same Uses as the Estates so sold.
Middleton (Norfolk) Inclosure Act 1814	54 Geo. 3. c. lxv	18 May 1814
An Act for inclosing Lands in the Parish of Middleton, in the County of Norfolk.
Great and Little Clifton Inclosures Act 1814	54 Geo. 3. c. lxvi	18 May 1814
An Act for inclosing Lands within the Townships and Manor of Great and Little Clifton, in the County of Cumberland.
Hunton and Arrathore Tithes Act 1814	54 Geo. 3. c. lxvii	18 May 1814
An Act for better collecting the Tithes in the Townships of Hunton and Arrathorne, in the Parishes of Patrick Brompton and Hornby, in the North Riding of the County of York.
Beethom Inclosure Act 1814	54 Geo. 3. c. lxviii	18 May 1814
An Act for inclosing Lands within the Manor or Division of Beethom, in the Parish of Beethom, in the County of Westmorland.
Chiswick Inclosure Act 1814	54 Geo. 3. c. lxix	18 May 1814
An Act for inclosing certain Lands in the Parish of Chiswick, in the County of Middlesex, over which Right of Common hath been extinguished.
Edington Inclosure Act 1814	54 Geo. 3. c. lxx	18 May 1814
An Act for inclosing Lands in the Hamlet or Chapelry of Edington, in the Parish of Moorlinch, in the County of Somerset.
Renwick Inclosure Act 1814	54 Geo. 3. c. lxxi	18 May 1814
An Act for inclosing Lands in the Manor and Parish of Renwick, in the County of Cumberland.
Mettingham and Bungay Trinity Inclosures Act 1814	54 Geo. 3. c. lxxii	18 May 1814
An Act for inclosing Lands within the Parishes of Metsingham and Bungay Trinity, in the County of Suffolk.
Bayton Inclosure Act 1814	54 Geo. 3. c. lxxiii	18 May 1814
An Act for inclosing Lands in the Parish of Bayton, in the County of Worcester.
Sutton Mandeville Inclosure Act 1814	54 Geo. 3. c. lxxiv	18 May 1814
An Act for inclosing Lands in the Tithing of Littlecot, in the Parish of Enford, in the County of Wilts.
Littlecot Inclosure Act 1814	54 Geo. 3. c. lxxv	18 May 1814
An Act for inclosing Lands in the Tithing of Littlecot, in the Parish of Enford, in the County of Wilts.
Aston Clinton Inclosure Act 1814	54 Geo. 3. c. lxxvi	18 May 1814
An Act for inclosing Lands in the Parish of Aston Clinton, in the County of Buckingham.
Sculcoates Additional Church Act 1814	54 Geo. 3. c. lxxvii	27 May 1814
An Act for building a Church or Chapel of Ease in the Parish of Sculcoates, in the East Riding of the County of York.
Parish of St. George, Dublin Act 1814	54 Geo. 3. c. lxxviii	27 May 1814
An Act for enlarging the Provisions of an Act passed in the Forty sixth Year of His present Majesty, (Note: Parish of St. George Dublin Act 1806 (46 Geo. 3. c. cxxiii)) intituled "An Act for altering and enlarging the Provisions of an Act passed in the Parliament of Ireland in the Thirty third Year of His present Majesty, (Note: St. George's Parish Act 1793 (33 Geo. 3. c. 53 (I))) for making and constituting a new Parish by the Name of "The Parish of Saint George," on the Ground adjoining the City of Dublin, therein described; and for making and building a Parish Church therein."
Atlas Assurance Company Act 1814	54 Geo. 3. c. lxxix	27 May 1814
An Act to enable The Atlas Assurance Company to sue and be sued in the Name of their Chairman, or Secretary, under certain Regulations.
Roads from Stroud Act 1814 (repealed)	54 Geo. 3. c. lxxx	27 May 1814
An Act for making and maintaining certain Roads from the Town of Stroud, and several other Places therein mentioned, all in the County of Gloucester. (Repealed by Stroud and Chalford Turnpike Roads Act 1855 (18 & 19 Vict. c. cix))
French Top and Glossop Road Act 1814 (repealed)	54 Geo. 3. c. lxxxi	27 May 1814
An Act for continuing the Term and enlarging the Powers of an Act of His present Majesty, (Note: Yorkshire Derby and Chester Roads Act 1793 (33 Geo. 3. c. 140)) for making a Road from French Top, in the West Riding of the County of York, to Glossop, in the County of Derby; and for repairing the Rood leading from Copley Meadow to Stayley Bridge, in the County Palatine of Chester. (Repealed by French Top and Stayley Road (Yorkshire, Cheshire) Act 1838 (1 & 2 Vict. c. xl))
Roads from Stafford to Uttoxeter and to Newport (Salop.) Act 1814 (repealed)	54 Geo. 3. c. lxxxii	27 May 1814
An Act for continuing the Term and altering and enlarging the Powers of an Act of His present Majesty, (Note: Stafford and Salop Roads Act 1793 (33 Geo. 3. c. 153)) for repairing the Road from Stafford to Uttoxeter, in the County of Stafford; and also the Road from Stafford to Newport, in the County of Salop. (Repealed by Stafford, Church Bridge and Uttoxeter Road, and Road from Stafford to Newport (Salop.) Act 1834 (4 & 5 Will. 4. c. lix))
Lincoln City Roads Act 1814 (repealed)	54 Geo. 3. c. lxxxiii	27 May 1814
An Act for continuing and amending an Act of His late Majesty, (Note: Lincoln Roads Act 1756 (29 Geo. 2. c. 84)) and Two Acts of His present Majesty, (Note: Lincoln Roads Act 1777 (17 Geo. 3. c. 109)) (Note: Lincoln (City) Roads Act 1797 (37 Geo. 3. c. 168)) for repairing certain Roads leading to and from the City of Lincoln, and other Roads therein mentioned. (Repealed by Lincoln Roads Act 1841 (4 & 5 Vict. c. cviii))
Alcester to Birmingham and Stratford-upon-Avon Road at Woolton Wawen Act 1814	54 Geo. 3. c. lxxxiv	27 May 1814
An Act for repairing the Road from Aulcester to Wootton Wawen, in the County of Warwick.
Hungerford and Leckford Road Act 1814	54 Geo. 3. c. lxxxv	27 May 1814
An Act for enlarging the Term and Powers of Two Acts of His present Majesty, (Note: Wiltshire Roads (No. 2) Act 1772 (12 Geo. 3. c. 85)) (Note: Hungerford to Leckford Road Act 1793 (33 Geo. 3. c. 168)) for repairing the Road from the End of the Turnpike Road from Besselsleigh, to Hungerford in the County of Berks, to Leckford otherwise Sousley Water, in the County of Wilts.
Ashton Gifford Inclosure Act 1814	54 Geo. 3. c. lxxxvi	27 May 1814
An Act for inclosing Lands in the Tithing of Ashton Gifford, in the Parish of Codford Saint Peter, in the County of Wilts.
Wallasey and West Kirby Inclosures Act 1814	54 Geo. 3. c. lxxxvii	27 May 1814
An Act for inclosing Lands in the Parishes of Wallasey and West Kirby, in the County of Chester.
Ballymore Eustace Inclosure Act 1814	54 Geo. 3. c. lxxxviii	27 May 1814
An Act for inclosing Lands within the Parish of Ballymore Eustace, in the County of Dublin.
Crewkerne Inclosure Act 1814	54 Geo. 3. c. lxxxix	27 May 1814
An Act for inclosing Lands in the Parish and Rectory Manor of Crewkerne, in the County of Somerset.
Clayton with Frickley Inclosure Act 1814	54 Geo. 3. c. xc	27 May 1814
An Act for inclosing Lands in the Parish of Frickley cum Clayton, otherwise Clayton with Frickley, in the West Riding of the County of York.
Barkisland Inclosure Act 1814	54 Geo. 3. c. xci	27 May 1814
An Act for inclosing Lands in the Manor of Barkisland, in the Parish of Halifax, in the County of York.
Whixall Inclosure Act 1814	54 Geo. 3. c. xcii	27 May 1814
An Act for inclosing Lands in Whixall, in the Parish of Prees, in the County of Salop.
Kilmington, Charlton Musgrave, Wincanton and Penselwood Inclosures Act 1814	54 Geo. 3. c. xciii	27 May 1814
An Act for inclosing Lands within the several Parishes of Kilmington, Charlton Musgrave, Wincanton and Penselwood, the County of Somerset.
Ovenden Inclosure Act 1814	54 Geo. 3. c. xciv	27 May 1814
An Act for inclosing Lands in the Manor of Ovenden, in the Parish of Halifax, in the County of York.
Streatley Inclosure Act 1814	54 Geo. 3. c. xcv	27 May 1814
An Act for inclosing Lands in the Parish of Streatley, in the County of Berks.
Woodland Inclosure Act 1814	54 Geo. 3. c. xcvi	27 May 1814
An Act for inclosing Lands in the Manor and Township of Woodland, in the Parish of Cockfield, in the County of Durham.
Dover Castle Gaol, Poor Debtors Relief Act 1814	54 Geo. 3. c. xcvii	17 June 1814
An Act for the Relief of Poor Debtors, and others, confined within the Gaol of Dover Castle.
Newport Pagnell Canal Act 1814 (repealed)	54 Geo. 3. c. xcviii	17 June 1814
An Act for making and maintaining a Navigable Canal from Newport Pagnell to The Grand Junction Canal, at Great Linford, in the County of Buckingham. (Repealed by Newport Pagnell Railway Act 1863 (26 & 27 Vict. c. cx))
Delamere Forest Inclosure Act 1814	54 Geo. 3. c. xcix	17 June 1814
An Act for altering and amending an Act of the Fifty-second Year of His present Majesty's Reign, (Note: Delamere Forest Inclosure Act 1812 (52 Geo. 3. c. cxxxvi)) for inclosing the Forest of Delamere, in the County of Chester.
Aberdeen Courthouse, City and County Offices and Gaol Act 1814 (repealed)	54 Geo. 3. c. c	17 June 1814
An Act for erecting and maintaining a new Court House and other Offices for the City and County of Aberdeen, and for providing and maintaining an additional Gaol for the said City and County, and for other Purposes relating thereto. (Repealed by Aberdeen County and Municipal Buildings Act 1866 (29 & 30 Vict. c. civ))
Usk Tram Road Act 1814	54 Geo. 3. c. ci	17 June 1814
An Act for making and maintaining a Tram Road or Railway from the Parish of Mamhilad, in the County of Monmouth, to or near Usk Bridge, in the said County.
Inveraray Gaol and Courthouse Act 1814	54 Geo. 3. c. cii	17 June 1814
An Act for erecting a new Gaol and Court House in the Burgh of Inveraray, in the Shire of Argyll.
Buckinghamshire County Rate Act 1814 (repealed)	54 Geo. 3. c. ciii	17 June 1814
An Act for making a fair and equal County Rate for the County of Buckingham. (Repealed by Statute Law (Repeals) Act 2008 (c. 12))
Kent Justices Act 1814 (repealed)	54 Geo. 3. c. civ	17 June 1814
An Act for enabling the Justices of the Peace for the County of Kent to hold a General Sessions annually, or oftener, for levying and applying the Rates and Expenditure of the said County; and to alter and amend an Act made in the Forty ninth Year of His present Majesty, (Note: Kent County Rates Act 1809 (49 Geo. 3. c. cxi)) for regulating the Rates of the said County. (Repealed by County of Kent Act 1981 (c. xviii))
Bath Improvement Act 1814 (repealed)	54 Geo. 3. c. cv	17 June 1814
An Act for better paving, cleansing, lighting, watching, regulating and improving, the City of Bath, and the Liberties and Precincts thereof. (Repealed by City of Bath Act 1851 (14 & 15 Vict. c. civ))
Wolverhampton Improvement and Markets Act 1814 or the Wolverhampton Improvement Act 1814 (repealed)	54 Geo. 3. c. cvi	17 June 1814
An Act for improving the Town of Wolverhampton, in the County of Stafford, and for removing and regulating the Markets in the said Town. (Repealed by Wolverhampton Improvement Act 1853 (16 & 17 Vict. c. xxviii))
Bristol Commercial Rooms Act 1814	54 Geo. 3. c. cvii	17 June 1814
An Act for enabling the Proprietors of The Commercial Roams in the City of Bristol, to sue and be sued in the Name of their Secretary, and for the Regulation of the said Rooms, and the Property thereof.
Dartford Improvement Act 1814 (repealed)	54 Geo. 3. c. cviii	17 June 1814
An Act for lighting, watching and improving the Town of Dartford, in the County of Kent. (Repealed by County of Kent Act 1981 (c. xviii))
Gateshead Improvement Act 1814 (repealed)	54 Geo. 3. c. cix	17 June 1814
An Act for cleansing, lighting and otherwise improving certain Streets and Places within and near the Town and Borough of Gateshead, in the County of Durham. (Repealed by Tyne and Wear Act 1980 (c. xliii))
St. Sidwell's Church, Exeter Act 1814	54 Geo. 3. c. cx	17 June 1814
An Act for enlarging the Powers of an Act of His present Majesty, for repairing the Church of Saint Sidwell, in the City of Exeter.
Liverpool Additional Church Act 1814 (repealed)	54 Geo. 3. c. cxi	17 June 1814
An Act for building a New Church (Note: Church of St Michael in the City, Upper Pitt Street, Liverpool.) within the Town and Parish of Liverpool, in the County Palatine of Lancaster. (Repealed by Liverpool Parish Church and Cemeteries Act 1823 (4 Geo. 4. c. lxxxix))
Lambeth Parish Churchyard and Approaches Act 1814	54 Geo. 3. c. cxii	17 June 1814
An Act for Enlarging the Church Yard and Burial Ground for the Parish of Lambeth, in the County of Surry; and for improving and widening the Approaches to the Church in the same Parish; and for other Purposes therein mentioned, relating thereto.
St. Mary, Newington, Poor Relief and Workhouse Act 1814 or the St. Mary Newington Improvement Act 1814 (repealed)	54 Geo. 3. c. cxiii	17 June 1814
An Act for repealing an Act passed in the Forty eighth Year of the Reign of His present Majesty, intituled "An Act for better assessing and collecting the Poor and other Rates in the Parish of Saint Mary Newington, in the County of Surry, and regulating the Poor thereof;" (Note: St. Mary Newington Parochial Rates Act 1808 (48 Geo. 3. c. xxi)) and granting other Powers in lieu thereof; for rebuilding or repairing the Workhouse; and removing and preventing Encroachments and Annoyances in the said Parish; and for other Purposes relating thereto. (Repealed by London Government (Borough of Southwark) Order in Council 1901 (SR&O 1901/275))
Canterbury Workhouse Act 1814 (repealed)	54 Geo. 3. c. cxiv	17 June 1814
An Act for altering, amending and rendering more effectual an Act of the First Year of King George the Second, (Note: Canterbury Poor Relief Act 1727 (1 Geo. 2. St. 2. c. 20)) for erecting a Workhouse in the City of Canterbury, for employing and maintaining the Poor there; and for other Purposes relating thereto. (Repealed by Local Government Board's Provisional Orders Confirmation (Poor Law) Act 1880 (43 & 44 Vict. c. lx))
Sheepskin Inspectors (King's Place Market, St. Mary Newington) Act 1814 (repealed)	54 Geo. 3. c. cxv	17 June 1814
An Act to authorize the Inspectors appointed by an Act of the Forty eighth Year of His present Majesty (Note: London Hides and Skins Trade Act 1808 (48 Geo. 3. c. lxxi)) to examine, inspect, stamp and mark Raw Skins of Sheep and Lambs in the Market held in King's Place, in the Parish of Saint Mary Newington, in the County of Surry. (Repealed by Statute Law (Repeals) Act 2008 (c. 12))
Gas Light and Coke Company Act 1814 (repealed)	54 Geo. 3. c. cxvi	17 June 1814
An Act for enlarging the Powers of an Act of His present Majesty (Note: Gas Light and Coke Company Act 1810 (50 Geo. 3. c. clxiii)) for granting certain Powers and Authorities to the Gas Light and Coke Company. (Repealed by Gaslight and Coke Company's Act 1868 (31 & 32 Vict. c. cvi))
Bishop Wearmouth Bridge (Mortgage Disposal by Lottery) Act 1814 (repealed)	54 Geo. 3. c. cxvii	17 June 1814
An Act to enable the several Persons therein named to dispose of certain Securities upon the Tolls of the Iron Bridge at Bishop Wearmouth, in the County of Durham, and Ferry Boats attached thereto, by way of Lottery. (Repealed by Borough of Sunderland Act 1851 (14 & 15 Vict. c. lxvii))
London Faculty of Physic (Meetings) Act 1814	54 Geo. 3. c. cxviii	17 June 1814
An Act to enable the President and College or Commonalty of the Faculty of Physic, in London, to hold their Corporate Meetings within the City of Westminster, or the Liberties thereof.
Cutlers' Company's Act 1814 or the Hallamshire Company of Cutlers Act 1814	54 Geo. 3. c. cxix	17 June 1814
An Act to repeal certain Parts of an Act passed in the Thirty first Year of His present Majesty, (Note: Cutlers' Company's Act 1791 (31 Geo. 3. c. 58)) for the better Regulation and Government of the Company of Cutlers within the Liberty, of Hallamshire in the County of York, and to alter and amend the said Act.
Hounslow Heath and Egham Hill Road Act 1814 (repealed)	54 Geo. 3. c. cxx	17 June 1814
An Act for continuing and amending an Act passed in the Forty ninth Year of His present Majesty, (Note: Hounslow Heath and Egham Hill Road Act 1809 (49 Geo. 3. c. lviii)) for more effectually repairing the Road from the Powder Mills on Hounslow Heath, in the County of Middlesex, to the twenty Mile Stone on Egham Hill, in the County of Surry. (Repealed by Hounslow Heath and Egham Hill Road Act 1831 (1 Will. 4. c. v))
Road from Dunstable to Hockliffe Act 1814 (repealed)	54 Geo. 3. c. cxxi	17 June 1814
An Act for continuing and amending an Act of His present Majesty, for repairing the Road from Dunstable to Hockliffe, in the County of Bedford. (Repealed by Statute Law (Repeals) Act 2013 (c. 2))
Tadcaster Bridge and Hob Moor Lane Road Act 1814 (repealed)	54 Geo. 3. c. cxxii	17 June 1814
An Act to enlarge the Term and Powers of an Act of His late Majesty, (Note: Tadcaster Bridge and Hob Moor Lane Road Act 1744 (18 Geo. 3. c. 16)) and Three Acts of His present Majesty, (Note: Tadcaster and York Road Act 1771 (11 Geo. 3. c. 83)) (Note: Tadcaster Bridge and Hob Moor Lane Road Act 1792 (32 Geo. 3. c. 155)) (Note: Tadcaster Bridge and Hob Moor Lane Road Act 1808 (48 Geo. 3. c. xxvi)) for repairing the Road from Tadcaster Bridge, (Note: Tadcaster Bridge, Tadcaster, North Yorkshire. 53°53′06″N 1°15′36″W) within the County of the City of York, to Hobmoor Lane End. (Note: The lane to Hob Moor from the A1063 Tadcaster Road, York, at the site of York Tyburn. 53°56′47″N 1°06′06″W) (Repealed by Tadcaster Bridge and Hob Moor Lane Road Act 1833 (3 & 4 Will. 4. c. lxxxiii))
Heage to Duffield Road Act 1814 (repealed)	54 Geo. 3. c. cxxiii	17 June 1814
An Act to continue the Term, and amend, alter and enlarge the Powers of an Act of His present Majesty, (Note: Heage to Duffield Road Act 1793 (33 Geo. 3. c. 177)) for repairing the Road from Heage, in the County of Derby, through Belper, to Duffield, in the said County. (Repealed by Duffield, Belper and Heage Road (Derbyshire) Act 1835 (5 & 6 Will. 4. c. xli))
Road from Bedford to the Olney and Newport Pagnell Turnpike Road Act 1814	54 Geo. 3. c. cxxiv	17 June 1814
An Act for repairing the Road from Saint Lloyds, in the Town of Bedford, in the County of Bedford, to the Turnpike Road leading from Olney to Newport Pagnell, in the County of Buckingham.
Roads in Stafford and Derby Act 1814 (repealed)	54 Geo. 3. c. cxxv	17 June 1814
An Act for enlarging the Term and Powers of Three Acts of His present Majesty, for repairing the Road from Newcastle under Line to Hassop, and from Middle Hills to the Macclesfield Turnpike Road near Buxton, and several other Roads therein described, in the Counties of Stafford and Derby; so far as such Acts relate to the Second District of the said Roads. (Repealed by Leek, Buxton and Monyash Turnpike Road Act 1852 (15 & 16 Vict. c. cxv))
Old Stratford and Dunchurch Road Act 1814 (repealed)	54 Geo. 3. c. cxxvi	17 June 1814
An Act for continuing and amending an Act of His present Majesty (Note: Old Stratford to Dunchurch Road Act 1775 (15 Geo. 3. c. 73)) for repairing the Road from Old Stratford, (Note: Old Stratford, Northamptonshire. 52°03′48″N 0°51′53″W) in the County of Northampton, to Dunchurch, (Note: Dunchurch, Warwickshire. 52°20′13″N 1°17′23″W) in the County of Warwick. (Repealed by Statute Law (Repeals) Act 2013 (c. 2))
Burder's Estate Act 1814	54 Geo. 3. c. cxxvii	17 June 1814
An Act for vesting certain Estates devised by the Will of William Burder, and now belonging to Jane Burder, William Burder, Charles Forster Burder, Ann Goldsmith and Mary Goldsmith, Infants, and to Samuel Burder, Mary Needham Burder, and Elizabeth Burder, in undivided Shares in Fee Simple, in Trustees, to be sold; and for investing the Purchase Monies arising, from the Shares of such of them as are Infants in other Real Estates to be convened to them in Fee Simple, in lieu of such Shares.
Stoke Newington Prebendary Leases Act 1814	54 Geo. 3. c. cxxviii	17 June 1814
An Act to enable the Prebendary of the Prebend of Stoke Newton, or Newnton otherwise Newington, in the County of Middlesex, founded in the Cathedral Church of Saint Paul in London, to grant a Lease of the Manor of Stoke Newton, or Newnton otherwise Newington, in the said County, Parcel of the said Prebend, in Manner therein mentioned, and to enable the granting of Sub Leases for building thereon, and otherwise improving the same, and for other Purposes.
Estates of Talbot and Marquis of Hertford Act 1814	54 Geo. 3. c. cxxix	17 June 1814
An Act for vesting certain Messuages and Farms, situate in the County of Warwick, Part of the Estates devised by the Will of Sir Charles Henry Talbot Baronet, deceased, in Trustees, in Trust, to convey the same to the Most Honourable Francis Ingram Seymour Conway, Marquis of Hertford, upon Payment by him of Fifteen thousand Pounds for the Purchase of the same, and for investing such Money in the Purchase of other Estates to be settled in lieu thereof, and to the same Uses.
Lord Calthorpe's Estate Act 1814	54 Geo. 3. c. cxxx	17 June 1814
An Act to enable the Right Honourable George Lord Calthorpe, and others, to grant Building Leases of Land in the Parish of Saint Pancras, in the County of Middlesex.
Rugby School's Estate Act 1814	54 Geo. 3. c. cxxxi	17 June 1814
An Act for amending and enlarging the Powers of an Act of the Seventeenth Year of His present Majesty, (Note: Rugby School and Alms-houses Act 1777 (17 Geo. 3. c. 71)) for enabling the Feoffees and Trustees of an Estate in the County of Middlesex, given by Lawrence Sheriff, for the founding and maintaining a School and Alms Houses at Rugby, in the County of Warwick, to sell Part of the said Estate, or to grant Leases thereof; and for other Purposes.
Prickard's Estate and Westminster Bridge Commissioners Act 1814 (repealed)	54 Geo. 3. c. cxxxii	17 June 1814
An Act for vesting in the Commissioners of Westminster Bridge the legal Estate in Fee Simple of certain Estates vested in Thomas Prickard, an Infant Trustee, and others; and for confirming a Sale made by the said Commissioners, and for making them a Corporation, and giving them further Powers of selling and leasing. (Repealed by Westminster Bridge Act 1853 (16 & 17 Vict. c. 46))
Symons' Estate Act 1814	54 Geo. 3. c. cxxxiii	17 June 1814
An Act for vesting an undivided Third Part of certain settled Estates of Thomas Symans Esquire, and Mary his Wife, in the County of Sussex, in Trustees, to be sold, and for laying out the Monies thence arising in the Purchase of other Estates, to be settled to the same Uses as the Estates so sold.
Bonar's Estate Act 1814	54 Geo. 3. c. cxxxiv	17 June 1814
An Act for vesting certain Estates, devised by the Will of Thomson Bonar Esquire, deceased, in the County of Kent, in Trustees, to be sold; and for laving out the Monies thence arising, in the Purchase of other Estates, to be settled to the same Uses as the Estates so sold.
St. Asaph's Cathedral Act 1814	54 Geo. 3. c. cxxxv	17 June 1814
An Act for amending an Act of King Charles the Second, (Note: Diocese of St Asaph Act 1677 (29 & 30 Cha. 2. c. 18 Pr.)) relating to the Cathedral Church of Saint Asaph, in the County of Flint.
Campsall, Norton and Askern Inclosures Act 1814	54 Geo. 3. c. cxxxvi	17 June 1814
An Act for inclosing Lands in the Manors or Townships of Campsall, Norton and Askern, in the County of York.
Barnoldswick and Salterforth Inclosures Act 1814	54 Geo. 3. c. cxxxvii	17 June 1814
An Act for inclosing Lands within the several Townships of Barnoldswick and Salterforth, in the Parish of Barnoldswick, in the West Riding of the County of York.
Potton Inclosure Act 1814	54 Geo. 3. c. cxxxviii	17 June 1814
An Act for inclosing, and exonerating from Tithes, Lands in the Parish of Potton, in the County of Bedford.
Mursley Inclosure Act 1814	54 Geo. 3. c. cxxxix	17 June 1814
An Act for inclosing Lands in the Parish of Mursley, in me County of Buckingham.
Combe St. Nicholas Inclosure Act 1814	54 Geo. 3. c. cxl	17 June 1814
An Act for inclosing Lands in the Parish of Combe Saint Nicholas, in the County of Somerset.
Hilderstone Inclosure Act 1814	54 Geo. 3. c. cxli	17 June 1814
An Act for inclosing Lands in the Manor of Hilderstone, in the County of Stafford.
Kirkdale and Hemsley Inclosure Act 1814	54 Geo. 3. c. cxlii	17 June 1814
An Act to complete the Purposes of an Act, intituled "An Act for inclosing Lands In the Parishes of Kirkdale and Helmsley, in the North Riding of the County of York." (Note: Kirkdale, &c. Inclosure Act 1806 (46 Geo. 3. c. 69 Pr.))
Welford Inclosure Act 1814	54 Geo. 3. c. cxliii	17 June 1814
An Act for inclosing Lands in the Parish of Welford, in the County of Berks.
Tetbury Inclosure Act 1814	54 Geo. 3. c. cxliv	17 June 1814
An Act for vesting certain Common Fields and Waste Grounds within the Town and Borough and Parish of Tetbury, in the County of Gloucester in Trustees, discharged of any Right of Common therein, and upon certain Trusts declared thereof.
Horton in Ribblesdale Inclosure Act 1814	54 Geo. 3. c. cxlv	17 June 1814
An Act for inclosing and reducing to a Stint, or for subdividing and inclosing several Commons and Waste Grounds within the Lower Division of Horton, in Ribblesdale, in the Parish of Horton, in Ribblesdale, in the West Riding of the County of York.
Scammonden Inclosure Act 1814	54 Geo. 3. c. cxlvi	17 June 1814
An Act for inclosing Lands in Scammonden, in the West Riding of the County of York.
Gowran Inclosure Act 1814	54 Geo. 3. c. cxlvii	17 June 1814
An Act for inclosing Lands in the Parish of Gowran, in the County of Kilkenny.
East Overton, Lockeridge and Fyfield Inclosures Act 1814	54 Geo. 3. c. cxlviii	17 June 1814
An Act for inclosing Lands in the Tithings of East Overton and Lockeridge, and in the Hamlet or Tithing of Fyfield, in the Parish of Overton, in the County of Wilts.
Boxford Inclosure Act 1814	54 Geo. 3. c. cxlix	17 June 1814
An Act for inclosing Lands in the Parish of Boxford, in the County of Berks.
Cumnor and South Hinckley Inclosures Act 1814	54 Geo. 3. c. cl	17 June 1814
An Act for inclosing Lands in the Parish of Cumner, and in the Chapelry of South Hinckley, in the County of Berks.
Netherall and Bradfield Inclosures Act 1814	54 Geo. 3. c. cli	17 June 1814
An Act for inclosing Lands in the several Manors of Netherhall and Rectory of Bradfield, in the Parish of Bradfield, in the County of Essex.
Thornton Inclosure Act 1814	54 Geo. 3. c. clii	17 June 1814
An Act for inclosing Lands within the Manor or Township of Thornton, in the Parish of Thornton, in the West Riding of the County of York.
Egham Inclosure Act 1814	54 Geo. 3. c. cliii	17 June 1814
An Act for inclosing Lands in the Parish of Egham, in the County of Surry.
Preston Patrick Inclosure Act 1814	54 Geo. 3. c. cliv	17 June 1814
An Act for inclosing Lands within the Township of Preston Patrick, in the Parish of Burton, in the County of Westmorland.
Broad Chalk and Chilmark Allotments Act 1814	54 Geo. 3. c. clv	17 June 1814
An Act for allotting Lands in the Parishes of Broad Chalke and Chilmark, in the County of Wilts.
East Bradenham Inclosure Act 1814	54 Geo. 3. c. clvi	17 June 1814
An Act for inclosing Lands within the Parish of East Bradenham, in the County of Norfolk.
Foxley Inclosure Act 1814	54 Geo. 3. c. clvii	17 June 1814
An Act for inclosing Lands within the Parish of Foxley, in the County of Norfolk.
Bexley Inclosure Act 1814	54 Geo. 3. c. clviii	17 June 1814
An Act for inclosing Lands in the Parish of Bexley, in the County of Kent.
Durrington Inclosure Act 1814	54 Geo. 3. c. clix	17 June 1814
An Act for inclosing Lands in the Parish of Durrington, in the County of Sussex.
Great and Little Chelworth Inclosures Act 1814	54 Geo. 3. c. clx	17 June 1814
An Act for inclosing Lands in the Manon of Great Chelworth and Little Chelworth, in the Parishes of Cricklade Saint Sampson and Cricklade Saint Mary, in the County of Wilts.
Llandisilio and Llaneilian Inclosures Act 1814	54 Geo. 3. c. clxi	17 June 1814
An Act for inclosing Lands in the Parishes of Llandisilio and Llaneilian, in the County of Anglesea.
Aymestrey and Kingsland Inclosures Act 1814	54 Geo. 3. c. clxii	17 June 1814
An Act for inclosing Lands in the Parishes of Aymestrey and Kingsland, in the County of Hereford.
Coxheath Inclosure Act 1814	54 Geo. 3. c. clxiii	17 June 1814
An Act for inclosing Coxheath, in the Parishes of Boughton Monchelsea, Loose, Linton, East Farleigh, West Farleigh and Hunton, in the County of Kent.
Wargrave and Warfield Inclosures Act 1814	54 Geo. 3. c. clxiv	17 June 1814
An Act for inclosing Lands in the Parishes of Wargrave and Warfield, in the County of Berks.
Tunstal Inclosure Act 1814	54 Geo. 3. c. clxv	17 June 1814
An Act for inclosing certain Moor, Common and Waste Grounds, in the Parish of Tunstal, in the County Palatine of Lancaster, and for converting the same into Stinted Pasture, and other Purposes.
Church Coppenhall Inclosure Act 1814	54 Geo. 3. c. clxvi	17 June 1814
An Act for inclosing Lands in the Manor and Township of Church Coppenhall, in the Parish of Coppenhall, in the County of Chester.
Egerton's Estate Act 1814	54 Geo. 3. c. clxvii	17 June 1814
An Act for reviving and confirming certain Powers given and granted by the Will of the late William Egerton Esquire deceased over certain Parts of his Estates thereby devised.
London and Cambridge Junction Canal Act 1814	54 Geo. 3. c. clxviii	20 June 1814
An Act to alter and amend an Act made in the Fifty second Year of His present Majesty, (Note: London and Cambridge Junction Canal Act 1812 (52 Geo. 3. c. cxli)) for making a Canal from the Stort Navigation, at or near Bishops Stortford, to the River Cam.
Scottish Ministers' Widows' Fund Act 1814 (repealed)	54 Geo. 3. c. clxix	20 June 1814
An Act to amend and render more effectual an Act passed in the Nineteenth Year of His present Majesty, (Note: Ministers' Widows Fund (Scotland) Act 1779 (19 Geo. 3. c. 20)) for the better raising and securing a Fund for a Provision for the Widows and Children of the Ministers of the Church of Scotland, and of the Heads, Principals and Masters in the Universities of Saint Andrews, Glasgow, Edinburgh and Aberdeen; and for repealing Two Acts, made in the Seventeenth (Note: Ministers' Widows Fund (Scotland) Act 1748 (22 Geo. 2. c. 21)) and Twenty second (Note: Ministers' Widows Fund (Scotland) Act 1748 (22 Geo. 2. c. 21)) Years of the Reign of His late Majesty King George the Second, for these Purposes. (Repealed by Church of Scotland Ministers' and Scottish University Professors' Widows' Fund Order Confirmation Act 1923 (13 & 14 Geo. 5. c. lxv))
Edinburgh Gaol, Offices, Low Calton Bridge and Improvements Act 1814	54 Geo. 3. c. clxx	20 June 1814
An Act to amend an Act passed in the last Session of Parliament, (Note: Edinburgh Gaol Act 1813 (53 Geo. 3. c. lxxvii)) for erecting and maintaining a new Gaol and other Buildings for the County and City of Edinburgh; for opening Communications to the new Gaol, building a Bridge over the Low Calton; and for other Purposes relating thereto
Greenwich Ferry and Approaches Act 1814	54 Geo. 3. c. clxxi	20 June 1814
An Act for amending an Act of the Fifty second Year of the Reign of His present Majesty, (Note: Greenwich Ferry and Approaches Act 1812 (52 Geo. 3. c. cxlviii)) for establishing a Ferry over the River Thames from Greenwich, in the County of Kent, to the Isle of Dogs, in the County of Middlesex, and for making, and maintaining Roads to communicate therewith.
Plymouth and Stoke Damarel Poor Relief and Improvement Act 1814 (repealed)	54 Geo. 3. c. clxxii	20 June 1814
An Act to repeal an Act, passed in the Twenty first Year of His present Majesty, (Note: Plymouth (Poor Relief, etc.) Act 1781 (21 Geo. 3. c. 72)) for better maintaining and regulating the Poor within the Town of Plymouth Dock and Parish of Stoke Damarel, in the County of Devon, and for other Purposes, and granting further Powers in lieu thereof; for lightingt watching and otherwise improving the said Town and Parish, and regulating Porters and Watermen therein. (Repealed by Local Government Board's Provisional Order Confirmation (No. 18) Act 1914 (4 & 5 Geo. 5. c. clxxxiii))
St. Pancras Improvement Act 1814 (repealed)	54 Geo. 3. c. clxxiii	20 June 1814
An Act for paving, lighting, watching and otherwise improving the several Streets and other Public Places partly lying on the West Side of Maiden Lane, partly on the North Side of the New Road, and partly on the West Side of the Pancras Road near Battle Bridge, in the Parish of Saint Pancras, in the County of Middlesex, and for presenting Nuisances and Obstructions therein. (Repealed by London Government (Borough of St. Pancras) Order in Council 1901 (SR&O 1901/274))
Sevenoaks and Tunbridge Wells Roads Act 1814 (repealed)	54 Geo. 3. c. clxxiv	20 June 1814
An Act for repairing the Road from Seven Oaks Common to Woodsgate, Tunbridge Wells and Kipping's Cross, and from Tunbridge Wells to Woodsgate in the County of Kent. (Repealed by Sevenoaks, Tunbridge Wells and Woodsgate Roads Act 1835 (5 & 6 Will. 4. c. lxiv))
Gloucester City and County Offices Act 1814	54 Geo. 3. c. clxxv	28 June 1814
An Act for erecting a Shire Hall and Courts for the Administration of Justice, and other Buildings for Public Purposes, for the County of Gloucester, and County of the City of Gloucester.
River Ouse Navigation Act 1814	54 Geo. 3. c. clxxvi	28 June 1814
An Act for altering and enlarging the Powers of Two Acts of His present Majesty, (Note: River Ouse Navigation Act 1790 (30 Geo. 3. c. 52)) (Note: River Ouse Navigation (Sussex) Act 1806 (46 Geo. 3. c. cxxii)) for improving the Navigation of the River Ouse, in the County of Sussex.
Norfolk Fen Drainage Act 1814 (repealed)	54 Geo. 3. c. clxxvii	28 June 1814
An Act for more effectually draining and preferring certain Fen Lands, and Low Grounds, in the Parishes of Stoke Ferry, Northwold, Wretton, Wereham, West Dereham, Roxham, Fordham, Denver, Downham Market, Wimbotsham and Stow Bardolph, in the County of Norfolk. (Repealed by Norfolk Drainage Act 1834 (4 & 5 Will. 4. c. lxiii))
British Fire Assurance Office Act 1814	54 Geo. 3. c. clxxviii	28 June 1814
An Act to enable The British Fire Assurance Office, to sue and be sued in the Name of their Secretary.
Westminster Society for Insurance of Lives and Survivorship and for Granting Annuities Act 1814 (repealed)	54 Geo. 3. c. clxxix	28 June 1814
An Act to enable The Westminster Society for Insurance of Lives and Survivorship, and for granting Annuities, to sue and be sued in the Name of their Secretary. (Repealed by Statute Law (Repeals) Act 2013 (c. 2))
Road from Potton to the Gamlingay and Eynesbury Road Act 1814	54 Geo. 3. c. clxxx	28 June 1814
An Act for repairing the Road from Potton in the County of Bedford, and Gamlingay in the County of Cambridge, to Eynesbury in the County of Huntingdon.
Grove's Estate Act 1814	54 Geo. 3. c. clxxxi	28 June 1814
An Act for vesting the Settled Estates of Thomas Grove the elder and Thomas Grove the younger, in the Counties of Radnor, Derby and Somerset, in Trustees, in Trust, to be sold; and for laying out the Monies arising from such Sale in the Purchase of other Estates, to be settled to the same uses.
Walker's Estate Act 1814	54 Geo. 3. c. clxxxii	28 June 1814
An Act for vesting an Estate of the Reverend Thomas Walker and Sarah his Wife, situate in or near the Borough of Leicester, comprized in the Settlement executed in pursuance of the Articles entered into previously to their Marriage, in a Trustee for Sale.
Portishead Inclosure Act 1814	54 Geo. 3. c. clxxxiii	28 June 1814
An Act for inclosing Lands in the Parish of Portishead, in the County of Somerset.
Gateshead Inclosure Act 1814	54 Geo. 3. c. clxxxiv	28 June 1814
An Act for inclosing the Borough Lands in the Parish of Gateshead, in the County of Durham.
Beilby Inclosure Act 1814	54 Geo. 3. c. clxxxv	28 June 1814
An Act for inclosing Lands in the Township of Beilby, in the Parish of Hayton, in the East Riding of the County of York.
Roads from Oxford over Botley Causeway Act 1814 (repealed)	54 Geo. 3. c. clxxxvi	1 July 1814
An Act for continuing the Term and altering and enlarging the Powers of Three Acts passed in the Seventh, (Note: Oxford and Fifield Road Act 1766 (7 Geo. 3. c. 66)) Eighth (Note: Oxford Roads Act 1768 (8 Geo. 3. c. 34)) and Eighteenth (Note: Oxford and Berks Roads Act 1778 (18 Geo. 3. c. 81)) Years of His present Majesty's Reign, for repairing and widening the Roads from Oxford over Botley Causeway to Fifield in the County of Berks, and Witney in the County of Oxford; and for more effectually repairing and amending the Road from and out of the Witney Road at the Village of Botley, into the said Road at or near Swinford Bridge. (Repealed by Oxford, Fifield and Witney Roads Act 1835 (5 & 6 Will. 4. c. ciii))
Beckett's and Sargeant's Charity Estates (Northampton) Act 1814 (repealed)	54 Geo. 3. c. clxxxvii	1 July 1814
An Act for the Sale of several Messuages and Lands in the Town of Northamton, and in the County of Buckingham, called Beckett's and Sargeant's Charity Estates, vested in Trustees for charitable Purposes; and for investing the Money arising from the Sale thereof, in the Purchase of Three Pounds per Centum Consolidated Bank Annuities, until a proper Purchase of Real Estate can be found; and in the mean Time for applying the Dividends and Annual Produce thereof upon the Trusts of the Charity; and for other Purposes. (Repealed by Northampton Act 1988 (c. xxix))
Lewin's Estate Act 1814	54 Geo. 3. c. clxxxviii	1 July 1814
An Act for vesting the legal Estate in Premises in the Counties of Radnor and Kent, the Property of Samuel Lewin Esquire, upon the Uses declared thereof, by Two several Indentures of Release and Common Recoveries suffered in pursuance thereof.
Cardington and Church Stretton Inclosures Act 1814	54 Geo. 3. c. clxxxix	1 July 1814
An Act for inclosing Lands in the Parishes of Cardington and Church Stretton, in the County of Salop.
Yarcombe Inclosure Act 1814	54 Geo. 3. c. cxc	1 July 1814
An Act for inclosing Lands in the Manor and Parish of Yarcombe, in the County of Devon.
British Society for Extending the Fisheries and Improving the Sea Coasts of the Kingdom Act 1814 (repealed)	54 Geo. 3. c. cxci	14 July 1814
An Act to enable the Governor, Deputy Governor and Directors of the Society called "The British Society for extending the Fisheries, and improving the Sea Coasts of the Kingdom," to levy certain Rates and Duties on Vessels frequenting their Harbours. (Repealed by Pulteney Harbour Act 1857 (20 & 21 Vict. c. xciii))
Edgehill Church Advowson Act 1814	54 Geo. 3. c. cxcii	14 July 1814
An Act to enable Edward Mason of Edgehill, in the Parish of Walton, in the County of Lancaster, Esquire, to appoint a Curate to the new Church or Chapel of Edgehill, and for other Purposes therein mentioned.
Northampton Improvement and South Bridge Act 1814 (repealed)	54 Geo. 3. c. cxciii	14 July 1814
An Act for better paving, lighting, watching and improving the Town of Northampton; and for taking down, widening and rebuilding the Bridge over the River Nine or Nen, at the South Entrance of the said Town, and improving the Avenues to the said Bridge. (Repealed by Northampton Improvement Act 1843 (6 & 7 Vict. c. lxxviii))
St. Anne Limehouse Workhouse and Improvement Act 1814 (repealed)	54 Geo. 3. c. cxciv	14 July 1814
An Act for rebuilding the Workhouse of the Parish of Saint Anne Limehouse, in the County of Middlesex; and for amending an Act of King George the Second, (Note: Tower of London Act 1756 (29 Geo. 2. c. 87)) for regulating the Nightly Watch and Paving, and other Purposes relating to the said Parish. (Repealed by London Government (Borough of Stepney) Order in Council 1901 (SR&O 1901/276))
Forth and Clyde Navigation Act 1814	54 Geo. 3. c. cxcv	14 July 1814
An Act to enlarge, alter and amend the Powers of the several Acts for making and maintaining the Forth and Clyde Navigation.
Commercial Buildings Company of Cork Act 1814	54 Geo. 3. c. cxcvi	14 July 1814
An Act to raise a Fund for defraying the Charge of Commercial improvements within the City and Port of Cork in Ireland.
Cork Bread Trade Act 1814	54 Geo. 3. c. cxcvii	14 July 1814
An Act to regulate the Price, Assize and Weight of Bread, and to provide for the due making thereof, within the City and County of the City of Cork, and the Suburbs and Liberties of the same.
Glasgow Saltmarket Street Bridge, Smoke Control and Improvements Act 1814	54 Geo. 3. c. cxcviii	14 July 1814
An Act to explain and amend so much of an Act, passed in the Thirty third Year of His present Majesty, (Note: Glasgow Improvement Act 1793 (33 Geo. 3. c. 124)) at relates to building a Bridge over the River Clyde, opposite to the Saltmarket Street in the City of Glasgow; and for regulating the Chimnies of Steam Engines, and other Works, in the said City and Suburbs thereof.
Clyde and Avon Bridges Act 1814	54 Geo. 3. c. cxcix	14 July 1814
An Act for altering, amending and enlarging an Act passed in the Tenth Year of the Reign of His present Majesty, intituled "An Act for building a Bridge over the River Clyde, near the Town of Hamilton, in the County of Lanark; and for making and repairing certain Roads and Avenues leading to the same;" (Note: Hamilton Bridge Act 1770 (10 Geo. 3. c. 93)) and for building and maintaining in place thereof another Bridge over the said River Clyde, farther up the River; and a Bridge over the River Avon near its Junction with the said River Clyde, with the necessary Roads and Avenues to and from both Bridges,
Glasgow to Port Dundas Road Act 1814 (repealed)	54 Geo. 3. c. cc	14 July 1814
An Act to continue and amend an Act passed in the Thirty third Year of His present Majesty, (Note: Glasgow Roads Act 1793 (33 Geo. 3. c. 160)) for making and maintaining the Road leading from the City of Glasgow to Port Dundas, and from Port Dundas to the High Road leading from the City of Glasgow to Garscube Bridge, by Dobbie's Loan, in the County of Lanark. (Repealed by Port Dundas and Glasgow Roads Act 1835 (5 & 6 Will. 4. c. cix))
Harrogate and Hutton Moor and Kirkby Hill Moor and Ripon Roads Act 1814	54 Geo. 3. c. cci	14 July 1814
An Act for repairing the Roads from Harrowgate, through Ripley and Ripon, to Hutton Moor, and from Kirkby Hill Moor to Ripon, in the County of York.
Livingston and Glasgow Road Act 1814 (repealed)	54 Geo. 3. c. ccii	14 July 1814
An Act for repealing several Acts passed for making and repairing the Road from Livingston, by the Kirk of Shotts, to the City of Glasgow and certain Roads connected therewith; and for making further and other Provisions for maintaining and repairing the said Roads. (Repealed by Livingston and Glasgow Road Act 1834 (4 & 5 Will. 4. c. xxx))
Willoughby de Broke Estate Act 1814	54 Geo. 3. c. cciii	14 July 1814
An Act for vesting certain Estates situated in the Counties of Hertford, Cambridge, Gloucester and Somerset, entailed by an Act of Parliament of the Twenty seventh Year of the Reign of His late Majesty King Henry the Eighth, (Note: Partition of Lands between the heirs of Lord Broke Act 1535 (27 Hen. 8. c. 44)) in Trustees, upon Trust to sell the same, and to lay out the Monies thence arising in the Purchase of other Estates, to be settled to the same Uses as the Estates so sold.
Earl Fortescue's Estate and Filleigh Parish Parsonage and Glebe Lands Act 1814	54 Geo. 3. c. cciv	14 July 1814
An Act for vesting certain Lands belonging to the Right Honourable Hugh Earl Fortescue, situate in the Parish of Filleigh, in the County of Devon, and a Parsonage House to be built on the said Lands, in the Rector for the time being of the said Parish, in Exchange for the Parsonage House and certain Glebe Lands belonging to the said Parish.
Brasenose College Oxford Act 1814	54 Geo. 3. c. ccv	14 July 1814
An Act for amending Two several Acts of the Tenth (Note: Hulme's Estate Act 1770 (10 Geo. 3. c. 51 Pr.)) and Thirty fifth (Note: Hulme's Estate Act 1795 (35 Geo. 3. c. 62 Pr.)) Years of the Reign of His present Majesty, relating to the Estates devised by William Hulme, Esquire; and to enable the Trustees thereof to apply the Trust Monies in making an Allowance to and Provision for the Exhibitioners of certain Exhibitions, founded by the said Testator in Brazen Nose College, Oxford; and also in founding and supporting a Lecture in Divinity in the said College; and to incorporate the said Trustees; and for other the Purposes therein mentioned,
Caton's Estate Act 1814	54 Geo. 3. c. ccvi	14 July 1814
An Act for vesting certain Estates at Middleton, in the County of Lancaster, devised by the Will of the late Richard Caton deceased, in Trustees, to be sold; and for laying out the Monies thence arising, in the Purchase of other Estates, to be settled to the same Uses as the Estates so sold.
Arncott Inclosure Act 1814	54 Geo. 3. c. ccvii	18 July 1814
An Act for inclosing Lands in Arncott, in the Parish of Ambrosden, in the County of Oxford.
Saint Stephen's Green (Dublin) Improvement Act 1814 (repealed)	54 Geo. 3. c. ccviii	18 July 1814
An Act for the Improvement of the square called Saint Stephen's Green in the city of Dublin. (Repealed by Saint Stephen's Green (Dublin) Act 1877 (40 & 41 Vict. c. cxxxiv))
Highways between Tyburn and Uxbridge Act 1814 (repealed)	54 Geo. 3. c. ccix	18 July 1814
An Act for continuing the Term and altering and enlarging the Powers of several Acts passed for repairing the Highways between Tyburn and Uxbridge, in the County of Middlesex, and for amending the Road leading from Brent Bridge, over Hanwell Heath, through the Parishes of Hanwell, New Brentford and Ealing to the great Western Road in the said County; and for lighting, watching and watering the Highway between Tyburn and Kensington Gravel Pits; and for exempting certain Carriages from Payment of Toll. (Repealed by Roads between Tyburn and Uxbridge Act 1826 (7 Geo. 4. c. lxxvi))
Speenhamland and Marlborough Road Act 1814	54 Geo. 3. c. ccx	18 July 1814
An Act to enlarge the Term and Powers of Two Acts passed in the Tenth (Note: Berks and Wilts Roads Act 1770 (10 Geo. 3. c. 100)) and Thirty third (Note: Berkshire and Wiltshire Roads Act 1793 (33 Geo. 3. c. 138)) Years of His present Majesty, for repairing the Highways from Speenhamland, in the County of Berks, to Marlborough, in the County of Wilts; and several other Roads therein mentioned.
Shrewsbury Estate Act 1814	54 Geo. 3. c. ccxi	18 July 1814
An Act for preventing the Right Honourable Charles Earl of Shrewsbury, and other Persons claiming under the Act (Note: Shrewsbury Estate Act 1720 (6 Geo. 1. c. 29 Pr.)) for entailing certain Estates with the Earldom of Shrewsbury, from disturbing certain Exchanges or Partitions heretofore made, of a small Part of those Estates by George late Earl of Shrewsbury.
Conock Inclosure Act 1814	54 Geo. 3. c. ccxii	18 July 1814
An Act for inclosing Lands in the Township or Hamlet of Conock, in the Parish of Chirton, in the County of Wilts.
Camberwell and Peckham Lighting and Watching Act 1814 (repealed)	54 Geo. 3. c. ccxiii	23 July 1814
An Act for lighting and watching certain Parts of the Liberties, Hamlets or Districts of Camberwell and Peckham, in the Parish of Saint Giles Camberwell, in the County of Surry. (Repealed by London Government (Borough of Camberwell) Order in Council 1901 (SR&O 1901/213))
St. Botolph without Aldgate Improvement Act 1814 (repealed)	54 Geo. 3. c. ccxiv	23 July 1814
An Act for improving certain Streets and Places in the Precinct of Saint Katharine, and in the Parish of Saint Botolph without Aldgate, in the County of Middlesex. (Repealed by London Government (Borough of Stepney) Order in Council 1901 (SR&O 1901/276))
Roads and Bridges in Lanark Act 1814	54 Geo. 3. c. ccxv	23 July 1814
An Act for more effectually repairing and maintaining certain Roads and Bridges in the County of Lanark.
Sinclair's Estate Act 1814	54 Geo. 3. c. ccxvi	23 July 1814
An Act for empowering the Judges of the Court of Session in Scotland to sell such Parts of the Entailed Estates of Murkle, Isauld and others, in the County of Caithness, belonging to Sir John Gordon Sinclair Baronet, as shall be sufficient for Payment of the Debts affecting the same.
Great Hormead Inclosure Act 1814	54 Geo. 3. c. ccxvii	23 July 1814
An Act for inclosing, and exonerating from Tithes, Lands in the Parish of Great Hormead, in the County of Hertford.
Ombersley Parish Church, Churchyard and Workhouse Act 1814	54 Geo. 3. c. ccxviii	25 July 1814
An Act for taking down the old Church Tower and Steeple of the Parish of Ombersley, in the County of Worcester, and erecting a new Church, and enlarging the Church Yard; and also, for building a Workhouse for the Poor of the said Parish.
Halliwell and Finsbury and Holborn Drains and Sewers Act 1814	54 Geo. 3. c. ccxix	25 July 1814
An Act to amend an Act made in the Eighteenth Year of His present Majesty (Note: Halliwell and Finsbury Drainage Act 1778 (18 Geo. 3. c. 66)) for making Drains and Sewers for carrying off the Water from the Prebendal Estate of Halliwell and Finsbury in the Suburbs of the City of London, and for other Purposes therein mentioned; and to extend some of the Provisions thereof to Part of the Holborn Division, in the County of Middlesex.
St. Katherine's Precinct Improvement Act 1814	54 Geo. 3. c. ccxx	27 July 1814
An Act for paving, cleansing, lighting, watching and regulating the Streets and Public Places, within Part of the Piscina of Saint Katherine, in the County of Middlesex.
Dublin Improvement Act 1814	54 Geo. 3. c. ccxxi	27 July 1814
An Act to explain and amend an Act passed in the Forty seventh Year of His present Majesty's Reign, (Note: Dublin Improvement Act 1807 (47 Geo. 3 Sess. 2. c. cix)) for the more effectual Improvement of the City of Dublin, and the Environs thereof.
St. Mary's, Dublin, Parish Boundaries Act 1814	54 Geo. 3. c. ccxxii	27 July 1814
An Act for more effectually ascertaining the Boundaries of the Parish of Saint Mary's Dublin.
Thames (West of London Bridge) Navigation Act 1814 (repealed)	54 Geo. 3. c. ccxxiii	27 July 1814
An Act for altering, amending and enlarging the Powers of Four Acts of His present Majesty, (Note: Thames Navigation Act 1774 (14 Geo. 3. c. 91)) (Note: Thames Navigation Act 1776 (17 Geo. 3. c. 18)) (Note: Thames (West of London Bridge) Navigation Act 1810 (50 Geo. 3. c. cciv)) (Note: Thames Navigation Act 1812 (52 Geo. 3. c. xlvi)) for improving the Navigation of the River Thames, Westward of London Bridge, within the Liberties of the City of London; and for further improving the said Navigation. (Repealed by Thames Conservancy Act 1894 (57 & 58 Vict. c. clxxxvii))
Duke of Norfolk and Goring Estates Act 1814	54 Geo. 3. c. ccxxiv	27 July 1814
An Act for exchanging Parts of the Settled Estates of the Most Noble Charles Duke of Norfolk, for Fee Simple Estates of the said Duke and for exchanging other Parts of such Settled Estates for Fee Simple Estates of Charles Goring Esquire.
Magdalen College Cambridge and Rectory of Elingham Act 1814	54 Geo. 3. c. ccxxv	27 July 1814
An Act for confirming the Annexation of the Rectory of Elingham, in the County of Norfolk, to the Mastership of Magdalen College, in the University of Cambridge.
Hughes' Estate Act 1814	54 Geo. 3. c. ccxxvi	27 July 1814
An Act for enabling the Reverend Sir Richard Hughes Baronet to sell certain Parts of his Settled Estates, in the Counties of Surry and Sussex, to the Most Noble Charles Duke of Norfolk, and for applying the Money thence arising in the Purchase of other Estates to be settled to the same Uses as the Estates so sold.
Ombersley Inclosure Act 1814	54 Geo. 3. c. ccxxvii	27 July 1814
An Act for inclosing Lands in the Manor and Parish of Ombersley, in the County of Worcester.
East India Docks (Blackwall) Act 1814 (repealed)	54 Geo. 3. c. ccxxviii	28 July 1814
An Act for amending and enlarging the Powers of Two Acts made in the Forty third (Note: East India Docks Act 1803 (43 Geo. 3. c. cxxvi)) and Forty sixth (Note: East India Docks Act 1806 (46 Geo. 3. c. cxiii)) Years of His present Majesty for the further Improvement of the Port of London, by making Docks and other Works at Blackwall, for the Accommodation of the East India Shipping in the said Port. (Repealed by East India Dock Act 1828 (9 Geo. 4. c. xcv))
St. Pancras Improvement Act 1814 (repealed)	54 Geo. 3. c. ccxxix	28 July 1814
An Act for paving, lighting, watching, cleansing and regulating the Streets and other Public Places on the Estate of Lord Calthorpe, near Gray's Inn Lane Road, in the Parish of Saint Pancras, in the County of Middlesex. (Repealed by London Government (Borough of St. Pancras) Order in Council 1901 (SR&O 1901/274))
Londonderry Foyle Bridge and Improvement Act 1814	54 Geo. 3. c. ccxxx	28 July 1814
An Act for rebuilding or repairing the Bridge across the River Foyle or Lough Foyle at Londonderry; for enabling the Corporation of that City to raise Money for that Purpose; to authorize the Advance of a certain Sum of Money out of the Consolidated Fund of Ireland; and for regulating the Fairs and Markets, and improving the Race Course there.
Lagan Navigation Act 1814	54 Geo. 3. c. ccxxxi	29 July 1814
An Act for amending and continuing several Acts made for the Improvement of the Lagan Navigation, and for further extending the same.
Road from Dundee to Cupar Act 1814	54 Geo. 3. c. ccxxxii	30 July 1814
An Act to alter and amend so much of an Act, made in the Fiftieth Year of His present Majesty, (Note: Roads in Forfar (County) Act 1810 (50 Geo. 3. c. cxxi)) for repairing the Roads in the County of Forfar, as relates to the Road from Dundee to Cupar, with its Branch to Meigle.
Road from Shoreditch Church through Hackney Act 1814 (repealed)	54 Geo. 3. c. ccxxxiii	30 July 1814
An Act for extending the Powers of the several Acts for maintaining the Turnpike Road from Shoreditch Church, through Hackney, to Stanford Hill, in the County of Middlesex, to a new Branch of Road leading from Kingsland Green into the above mentioned Turnpike Road at Hackney. (Repealed by Road from Shoreditch Church through Hackney Act 1821 (1 & 2 Geo. 4. c. cxii))

=== Private acts ===
Short title	Citation	Royal assent
Long title
Mr. Grant's Indemnity Act 1814	54 Geo. 3. c. 3 Pr.	29 March 1814
An Act for indemnify Charles Grant Junior, Esquire, from certain Penalties which he has incurred by sitting and voting in the House of Commons without having taken the Oaths required by Law to be taken before the Lord Steward, or his Deputy or Deputies.
Sir William Payne's Name Act 1814	54 Geo. 3. c. 4 Pr.	29 March 1814
An Act to enable Sir William Payne Baronet and his Issue, to take, use and bear the Surname and Arms of Galwey, pursuant to the Will of Tobias Wall Galwey Esquire, deceased.
Inkberrow Inclosure Act 1814	54 Geo. 3. c. 5 Pr.	19 April 1814
An Act for inclosing Lands in the Parish of Inkberrow, in the County of Worcester.
Diss Inclosure Act 1814	54 Geo. 3. c. 6 Pr.	4 May 1814
An Act for inclosing Lands in the Parish of Diss, in the County of Norfolk.
Hempstead, &c. Inclosure Act 1814	54 Geo. 3. c. 7 Pr.	4 May 1814
An Act for inclosing Lands within the Parishes of Hempstead, Barnwood and Upton Saint Leonards, and the Hamlets of Barton Saint Mary, Barton Saint Michael, Wotton, Tuffley, South Hamlet and Vill of Wotton, all in the County of Gloucester.
Hurley Inclosure Act 1814	54 Geo. 3. c. 8 Pr.	4 May 1814
An Act for inclosing Lands within the Manor of Hurley, in the Parish of Kingsbury, in the County of Warwick.
Wendling Inclosure Act 1814	54 Geo. 3. c. 9 Pr.	4 May 1814
An Act for inclosing Lands in the Parish of Wendling, in the County of Norfolk.
St. Antonio's Naturalization Act 1814	54 Geo. 3. c. 10 Pr.	4 May 1814
An Act for naturalizing Francis Platamone Count Saint Antonio.
Binham Inclosure Act 1814	54 Geo. 3. c. 11 Pr.	18 May 1814
An Act for inclosing Lands in the Parish of Binham, in the County of Norfolk.
Hardwick Inclosure Act 1814	54 Geo. 3. c. 12 Pr.	18 May 1814
An Act for inclosing Lands in the Parish of Hardwick, in the County of Norfolk.
Little Melton Inclosure Act 1814	54 Geo. 3. c. 13 Pr.	18 May 1814
An Act for inclosing Lands in the Parish of Melton Parva otherwise Little Melton, in the County of Norfolk.
Congresbury, &c. Inclosure Act 1814	54 Geo. 3. c. 14 Pr.	18 May 1814
An Act for altering, amending and rendering more effectual an Act of His present Majest, intituled "An Act for dividing, alloting and inclosing the Open and Commonable Lands in the Parishes of Congresbury, Week Saint Lawrence and Puxton, in the County of Someset." (Note: Congresbury Inclosure Act 1809 (49 Geo. 3. c. 14 Pr.))
Collingham Inclosure Act 1814	54 Geo. 3. c. 15 Pr.	18 May 1814
An Act for inclosing Lands within the Township and Manor of Collingham, in the West Riding of the County of York.
Berkley Inclosure Act 1814	54 Geo. 3. c. 16 Pr.	18 May 1814
An Act for inclosing Lands within the Parishes of Berkley and Standerwick, in the County of Somerset.
Sandon Inclosure Act 1814	54 Geo. 3. c. 17 Pr.	18 May 1814
An Act for inclosing Lands in the Parish of Sandon, in the County of Stafford.
Sloley Inclosure Act 1814	54 Geo. 3. c. 18 Pr.	18 May 1814
An Act for inclosing Lands within the Parish of Sloley, in the County of Norfolk.
Norton Canon Inclosure Act 1814	54 Geo. 3. c. 19 Pr.	18 May 1814
An Act for inclosing Lands in the Parish of Norton Canon, in the County of Hereford.
Abberley Inclosure Act 1814	54 Geo. 3. c. 20 Pr.	18 May 1814
As Act for inclosing Lands in the Parish of Abberley, in the County of Worcester.
Quinton Inclosure Act 1814	54 Geo. 3. c. 21 Pr.	18 May 1814
An Act for inclosing Lands within the Parish of Quinton, in the County of Northampton, and for extinguishing the Tithes thereof, and of the ancient inclosed Lands within the said Parish.
Sevenhampton Inclosure Act 1814	54 Geo. 3. c. 22 Pr.	18 May 1814
An Act for inclosing Lands in the Parish of Sevenhampton, in the County of Gloucester.
Green's Divorce Act 1814	54 Geo. 3. c. 23 Pr.	18 May 1814
An Act to dissolve the Marriage of George Henry Green Esquire, with Sarah Nisbet Rutherford his now Wife, and to enable him to marry again; and for other Purposes therein mentioned.
Tarrant Keinston Inclosure Act 1814	54 Geo. 3. c. 24 Pr.	27 May 1814
An Act for confirming and establishing the Division and Inclosure of certain Lands within the Parish and Manor of Tarrant Keinston, in the County of Dorset.
Herniock Inclosure Act 1814	54 Geo. 3. c. 25 Pr.	27 May 1814
An Act for inclosing Lands in the Parish of Herniock, in the County of Devon.
Wickersley Inclosure Act 1814	54 Geo. 3. c. 26 Pr.	27 May 1814
An Act for inclosing Lands in the Parish of Wickersley, in the County of York.
Wentworth, &c. Inclosure Act 1814	54 Geo. 3. c. 27 Pr.	27 May 1814
An Act for inclosing Lands within the several Townships of Wentworth, in the Parish of Wath upon Dearne, and Kimberworth, in the Parish of Rotherham, in the County of York.
Gretton Inclosure Act 1814	54 Geo. 3. c. 28 Pr.	27 May 1814
An Act for inclosing Lands in the Hamlet of Gretton, in the Parish of Winchcomb, in the County of Gloucester.
Lord Grenville's Estate Act 1814	54 Geo. 3. c. 29 Pr.	17 June 1814
An Act for establishing and confirming several Exchanges of Glebe Lands, Sheep Pastures, Cow Pastures, Beast Leazes and other Rights of Common belonging to the Rectory and Parish Church of Blandford Saint Mary, in the Parish of Blandford Saint Mary, in the County of Dorset, for Lands of the Right Honourable Thomas Lord Camelford the Father, and Thomas Lord Camelford the Son, both deceased, and of the Right Honourable William Wyndham Lord Grenville, and Anne Baroness Grenville his Wife, in the said Parish.
Oriel College, Oxford, and George Harris's Estate Act 1814	54 Geo. 3. c. 30 Pr.	17 June 1814
An Act for effectuating an Exchange between the Provost and Scholars of Oriel College in Oxford, and George Harrie Esquire, of certain Freehold Estates in the County of Kent.
Hamilton's Estate Act 1814	54 Geo. 3. c. 31 Pr.	17 June 1814
An Act for settling and securing the Lands and Barony of Bollochtoul Girvan, and other Hereditaments, in the County of Ayr, to and in favour of Sir Hew Dalrymple Hamilton Baronet, and the Series of Heirs entitled to take, by certain Deeds of Entail made by John Lord Bargany and John Hamilton Esquire, deceased, under the Conditions and Limitations contained in the said Deeds and in lieu thereof, for vesting certain Parts of the entailed Estate of Bargany lying in the said County, in the said Sir Hew Dalrymple Hamilton Baronet and his Heirs and Assigns, in Fee Simple.
Kelfield Road Act 1814	54 Geo. 3. c. 32 Pr.	17 June 1814
An Act for establishing as a Public Highway a Road from Cawood Ferry to Kelfield, in the East Riding of the County of York, set out under the Kelfield Inclosure Act, (Note: Kelfield Inclosure Act 1806 (46 Geo. 3. c. 71 Pr.)) as a Private Road.
Thorseway Inclosure Act 1814	54 Geo. 3. c. 33 Pr.	17 June 1814
An Act for allotting Lands in the Parish of Thorseway, in the County of Lincoln.
Wytham Inclosure Act 1814	54 Geo. 3. c. 34 Pr.	17 June 1814
An Act for inclosing Lands in the Parish of Witham, in the County of Berks.
Whitigader Inclosure Act 1814	54 Geo. 3. c. 35 Pr.	17 June 1814
An Act for inclosing Lands in the Lordship or Manor of Whitigader otherwise Whitagada, in the seveval Parishes of Abergwilly, Llanegwad and Llanllawddog, in the County of Carmarthen.
Norton in Bredon Inclosure Act 1814	54 Geo. 3. c. 36 Pr.	17 June 1814
An Act for inclosing Lands in the Hamlet or Chapelry of Norton, in the Parish of Bredon, in the County of Worcester.
Skeyton, &c. Inclosure Act 1814	54 Geo. 3. c. 37 Pr.	17 June 1814
An Act for inclosing Lands in the Parishes of Skeyton, Burgh next Aylsham and Tottington, in the County of Norfolk.
Tunstead, &c. Inclosure Act 1814	54 Geo. 3. c. 38 Pr.	17 June 1814
An Act for inclosing Lands in the Parishes of Tunstead and Sco Ruston, in the County of Norfolk.
Stetchworth Inclosure Act 1814	54 Geo. 3. c. 39 Pr.	17 June 1814
An Act for inclosing Lands in the Parish of Stetchworth, in the County of Cambridge.
Fingringhoe Inclosure Act 1814	54 Geo. 3. c. 40 Pr.	17 June 1814
An Act for inclosing Lands in the Parish of Fingringhoe, in the County of Essex.
Bury St. Edmunds Inclosure Act 1814	54 Geo. 3. c. 41 Pr.	17 June 1814
An Act for inclosing Lands in the Borough of Bury Saint Edmunds, in the County of Suffolk.
Orcop Inclosure Act 1814	54 Geo. 3. c. 42 Pr.	17 June 1814
An Act for inclosing Lands in the Parish of Orcop, in the County of Hereford.
Effingham Inclosure Act 1814	54 Geo. 3. c. 43 Pr.	17 June 1814
An Act for inclosing a Piece of Common or Waste Land in the Parish of Effingham, within the Manor of Byfleet, in the County of Surry.
Llandilo, &c. Inclosure Act 1814	54 Geo. 3. c. 44 Pr.	17 June 1814
An Act for inclosing Lands in the several Lordships or Manors of Llandilo Patria, Llangadock and Llanfynydd, in the several Parishes of Llandilofawr, Llandeseisant, Llandgadock and Llanfynydd, in the County of Carmarthen.
Courage Inclosure Act 1814	54 Geo. 3. c. 45 Pr.	17 June 1814
An Act for inclosing Lands in the Tithing of Courage, in the Parish of Chieveley, in the County of Berks.
Strensham Inclosure Act 1814	54 Geo. 3. c. 46 Pr.	17 June 1814
An Act for inclosing Lands in the Parish of Strensham, in the County of Worcester.
Bloxam's Divorce Act 1814	54 Geo. 3. c. 47 Pr.	17 June 1814
An Act for dissolving the Marriage of Samuel Anthony Bloxam with Mary his now Wife (late Mary M^{c}Leane Spinster), and for enabling him to marry again; and for other Purposes therein mentioned.
Garde's Divorce Act 1814	54 Geo. 3. c. 48 Pr.	17 June 1814
An Act to dissolve the Marriage of Henry Prendergast Garde Esquire with Catherine Garde his now Wife, and to enable him to marry again; and for other Purposes therein mentioned.
Best's Divorce Act 1814	54 Geo. 3. c. 49 Pr.	17 June 1814
An Act to dissolve the Marriage of Thomas Best Esquire, with Emily Best, commonly called the Right Honourable Lady Emily Best, his now Wife, and to enable him to marry again; and for other Purposes therein mentioned.
Penkridge, &c. Inclosure Act 1814	54 Geo. 3. c. 50 Pr.	20 June 1814
An Act for inclosing Lands in the several Parishes of Penkridge, Cannock and Berkswich, and the extraparochial Place of Teddesley otherwise Teddesley Hay, in the County of Stafford.
Stoulton Church Act 1814	54 Geo. 3. c. 51 Pr.	28 June 1814
An Act for vesting in John Sommers Lord Sommers, his Heirs and Assigns, the Right of Nomination and Presentation of a Minister or Curate to the Parish and Parish Church of Stoulton, in the County of Worcester.
Burwell Inclosure Act 1814	54 Geo. 3. c. 52 Pr.	28 June 1814
An Act for inclosing Lands in the Parish of Burwell, in the County of Cambridge.
Blyth Inclosure Act 1814	54 Geo. 3. c. 53 Pr.	28 June 1814
An Act for inclosing Lands in the Township and Liberty of Blyth, in the County of Nottingham.
Llansaintfread, &c. Inclosure Act 1814	54 Geo. 3. c. 54 Pr.	28 June 1814
An Act for inclosing Lands in the several Parishes of Llansaintfread and Llanvillo, in the County of Brecon.
Westcombland Inclosure Act 1814	54 Geo. 3. c. 55 Pr.	28 June 1814
An Act for inclosing Lands in the Tithing of Westcombland, in the Parish of Buckland Saint Mary, in the County of Somerset.
Bishoprick of Bristol Act 1814	54 Geo. 3. c. 56 Pr.	14 July 1814
An Act for annexing the Vicarage of Almondsbury, in the County of Gloucester, to the Bishoprick and See of Bristol.
Bignor Advowson Act 1814	54 Geo. 3. c. 57 Pr.	14 July 1814
An Act for effectuating an Exchange of the Advowson of the Rectory of the Church of Bignor, in the County of Sussex, belonging to His Majesty, for the Advowson of the Rectory of the Church of North Scarle in the County of Lincoln, belonging to George Obrien Earl of Egremont.
Roberts's Name Act 1814	54 Geo. 3. c. 58 Pr.	14 July 1814
An Act to establish and confirm the Assumption of the Surname and Use of the Arms of Powell by John Powell Powell, formerly John Powell Roberts Esquire, and to enable the Heirs of His Body to take, use and bear the Surname and Arms of Powell, pursuant to the Will of John Powell Esquire, deceased.
Wrotham, &c. Inclosure Act 1814	54 Geo. 3. c. 59 Pr.	18 July 1814
An Act for inclosing Lands in the Parishes of Wrotham and Ightham, in the County of Kent.
Birling Inclosure Act 1814	54 Geo. 3. c. 60 Pr.	18 July 1814
An Act for inclosing Lands in the Parish of Birling, in the County of Kent.
Llanrhaiadr Inclosure Act 1814	54 Geo. 3. c. 61 Pr.	18 July 1814
An Act for inclosing Lands in the Parish of Llanrhaiadr, in Kinmerch, in the County of Denbigh.
Wenden, &c. Inclosure Act 1814	54 Geo. 3. c. 62 Pr.	23 July 1814
An Act for inclosing Lands in the Parishes of Wenden otherwise Wendens Ambo, and Arkesden, in the County of Essex.
Marquis of Sligo's Estate Act 1814	54 Geo. 3. c. 63 Pr.	27 July 1814
An Act for rendering valid and effectual the Powers of Sale and Exchange, and for the Appointment of new Trustees in the Settlement made subsequent to the Marriage of the late Most Honourable John Dennis Marquis of Sligo, with Louisa Catherine his Wife; and for the other Purposes therein mentioned.
Dame Reade's Estate Act 1814	54 Geo. 3. c. 64 Pr.	28 July 1814
An Act for more effectually carrying into Execution an Act passed in the Fifty third Year of the Reign of His present Majesty, intituled "An Act for vesting a Leasehold Messuage in Curzon Street, in the County of Middlesex, and other Estates settled by the Will of Dame Harriott Reade, deceased, in Trustees to be sold, and to lay out the Money thence arising in the Purchase of other Estates, to be settled in like manner." (Note: Reade's Estate Act 1813 (53 Geo. 3. c. 79 Pr.))
Dundas's Divorce Act 1814	54 Geo. 3. c. 65 Pr.	30 July 1814
An Act to dissolve the Marriage of Robert Dundas Esquire, with Jane Rollo his now Wife, and to enable him to marry again; and for other Purposes therein mentioned.

=== Sources ===
- The Statutes of the United Kingdom of Great Britain and Ireland. Vol. 53 part 1: 54 George III. London: Joseph Butterworth. 1814 – via Internet Archive.
- The Statutes of the United Kingdom of Great Britain and Ireland. Vol. 53 part 1: 54 George III. London: Joseph Butterworth. 1814 – via Google Books.
- The Statutes of the United Kingdom of Great Britain and Ireland. Vol. 53 part 2: 54 George III. London: Joseph Butterworth. 1814 – via Internet Archive.
- Raithby, John, ed. (1814). The Statutes of the United Kingdom of Great Britain and Ireland. Vol. 5: 53 George III and 54 George III. London: Eyre and Strahan – via Google Books.
- Journals of the House of Commons. Vol. 69. London: His Majesty's Stationery Office. pp. 3–521 – via Google Books.
- Chronological Table of and Index to the Statutes. Vol. 1: To the End of the Session 59 Vict. Sess. 2 (1895) (13th ed.). London: Her Majesty's Stationery Office. 1896. pp. 206–210 – via Google Books.

== 55 Geo. 3 ==
The third session of the 5th Parliament of the United Kingdom, which met from 8 November 1814 until 12 July 1815.

This session was also traditionally cited as 55 G. 3.

=== Public general acts ===
Short title	Citation	Royal assent
Long title
Pensions to Seamen, etc. Act 1814 (repealed)	55 Geo. 3. c. 1	26 November 1814
An act for the Encouragement and Reward of Petty Officers, Seamen and Royal Marines, for long and faithful Service, and for the Consolidation of the Chest at Greenwich with the Royal Hospital there. (Repealed by Greenwich Hospital Outpensions, etc. Act 1829 (10 Geo. 4. c. 26))
National Debt (No. 5) Act 1814 (repealed)	55 Geo. 3. c. 2	26 November 1814
An act for directing the Application of the Residuary Personal Estate of Anna Maria Reynolds Spinster bequeathed by her to the Use of the Sinking Fund. (Repealed by Statute Law Revision Act 1870 (33 & 34 Vict. c. 69))
Duties on Malt, etc. Act 1814 (repealed)	55 Geo. 3. c. 3	1 December 1814
An act for continuing to His Majesty certain Duties on Malt, Sugar, Tobacco and Snuff in Great Britain; and on Pensions, Offices and Personal Estates in England, for the Service of the Year One thousand eight hundred and fifteen. (Repealed by Statute Law Revision Act 1873 (36 & 37 Vict. c. 91))
Exchequer Bills (No. 5) Act 1814 (repealed)	55 Geo. 3. c. 4	1 December 1814
An act for raising the Sum of Twelve Millions five hundred thousand Pounds, by Exchequer Bills, for the Service of Great Britain for the Year One thousand eight hundred and fifteen. (Repealed by Statute Law Revision Act 1873 (36 & 37 Vict. c. 91))
Exchequer Bills (No. 6) Act 1814 (repealed)	55 Geo. 3. c. 5	1 December 1814
An act to enable the Commissioners of His Majesty's Treasury to issue Exchequer Bills, on the Credit of such Aids or Supplies as have been or shall be granted by Parliament for the Service of Great Britain for the Year One thousand eight hundred and fifteen. (Repealed by Statute Law Revision Act 1873 (36 & 37 Vict. c. 91))
Negotiation of Notes and Bills Act 1814 (repealed)	55 Geo. 3. c. 6	1 December 1814
An act to continue until the Twenty fifth Day of March One thousand eight hundred and sixteen, an Act (Note: Negotiation of Notes and Bills Act 1797 (37 Geo. 3. c. 32)) for suspending the Operation of an Act of the Seventeenth Year of His present Majesty, (Note: Bills of Exchange Act 1776 (17 Geo. 3. c. 30)) for restraining the Negotiation of Promissory Notes and Bills of Exchange under a limited Sum in England. (Repealed by Statute Law Revision Act 1873 (36 & 37 Vict. c. 91))
Duties on Glass, etc. (Ireland) Act 1814 (repealed)	55 Geo. 3. c. 7	1 December 1814
An act to repeal an Act of the last Session of Parliament, for granting Duties of Excise on certain Sorts of Glass made in Ireland, and for granting and allowing certain Countervailing Duties and Drawbacks in respect thereof. (Repealed by Statute Law Revision Act 1873 (36 & 37 Vict. c. 91))
Importation, etc. (No. 2) Act 1814 (repealed)	55 Geo. 3. c. 8	1 December 1814
An act to continue during the Continuance of the present Hostilities, and until Six Months after the Ratification of a Definitive Treaty of Peace, so much of an Act of the Thirty fourth Year of His present Majesty, (Note: Importation in Neutral Vessel, etc. Act 1803 (43 Geo. 3. c. 153)) as permits the Importation into Great Britain and Ireland in Neutral Vessels, from States in Amity with His Majesty, of certain Goods, Wares and Merchandize. (Repealed by Statute Law Revision Act 1873 (36 & 37 Vict. c. 91))
Importation, etc. (No. 3) Act 1814 (repealed)	55 Geo. 3. c. 9	1 December 1814
An act to continue, until the Expiration of Six Months after the Conclusion of the present Hostilities, an Act of the Forty sixth Year of His present Majesty, (Note: Neutral Ships Act 1806 (46 Geo. 3. c. 111)) for authorizing His Majesty in Council to allow the Importation and Exportation of certain Goods and Commodities in Neutral Ships into and from His Majesty's Territories in the West Indies and Continent of South America. (Repealed by Statute Law Revision Act 1873 (36 & 37 Vict. c. 91))
Duties upon East India Goods Act 1814 (repealed)	55 Geo. 3. c. 10	1 December 1814
An act to make further Provision respecting the Duties payable upon East India Goods, and to allow Bond to be given for Payment of the Duties upon such Goods when imported by Private Traders. (Repealed by Customs Law Repeal Act 1825 (6 Geo. 4. c. 105))
Privileges of Foreign Ships, etc. Act 1814 (repealed)	55 Geo. 3. c. 11	1 December 1814
An act to continue, until Six Months after the Ratification of a Definitive Treaty of Peace, an Act of the Forty fifth Year of His present Majesty, (Note: Foreign Ships, etc. Act 1805 (45 Geo. 3. c. 32)) for granting to Foreign Ships put under His Majesty's Protection, the Privileges of Prize Ships; and for allowing Aliens in Foreign Colonies surrendered to His Majesty to exercise the Occupations of Merchants or Factors during the present War. (Repealed by Statute Law Revision Act 1873 (36 & 37 Vict. c. 91))
Unlawful Distillation, etc. (Ireland) Act 1814 (repealed)	55 Geo. 3. c. 12	1 December 1814
An act to amend several Acts relating to Fines in respect of unlawful Distillation in Ireland, to the warehousing of Spirits, and to the securing the Duties of Excise on Spirits distilled, and on Hides and Skins tanned in Ireland. (Repealed by Illicit Distillation (Ireland) Act 1831 (1 & 2 Will. 4. c. 55))
Superintending Magistrates, etc. (Ireland) Act 1814 (repealed)	55 Geo. 3. c. 13	1 December 1814
An act to amend an Act passed in the last Session of Parliament, intituled "An act to provide for the better Execution of the Laws in Ireland, by appointing Superintending Magistrates and additional Constables in Counties, in certain cases." (Note: Appointment of Superintending Magistrates, etc. Act 1814 (54 Geo. 3. c. 131)) (Repealed by Constabulary (Ireland) Act 1836 (6 & 7 Will. 4. c. 13))
Customs (No. 9) Act 1814 (repealed)	55 Geo. 3. c. 14	1 December 1814
An act to impose certain Duties on the Importation, and to allow Drawbacks on the Exportation of certain Sorts of Wood into and from Ireland, in lieu of former Duties and Drawbacks on the like Sorts of Wood; and to indemnify Persons who have admitted certain Sorts of Wood to Entry on Payment of a Proportion only of the Duty imposed thereon. (Repealed by Statute Law Revision Act 1861 (24 & 25 Vict. c. 101))

=== Sources ===
- The Statutes of the United Kingdom of Great Britain and Ireland. Vol. 54: 55 George III. London: Joseph Butterworth. 1815 – via Google Books.

== See also ==
- List of acts of the Parliament of the United Kingdom
