= Wild Animals in Captivity Protection Act 1900 =

Act of the Parliament of the United Kingdom

Wild Animals in Captivity Protection Act 1900 (Note: Section 6.)
- Act of Parliament
- Parliament of the United Kingdom
- Long title: An Act for the prevention of cruelty to wild animals in captivity.
- Citation: 63 & 64 Vict. c. 33
- Territorial extent: England and Wales; Northern Ireland; Scotland; (Note: Section 5. Extended to Scotland by the Wild Animals in Captivity Protection (Scotland) Act 1909 (9 Edw. 7. c. 33))

Dates
- Royal assent: 6 August 1900
- Commencement: 6 August 1900 (Note: The Acts of Parliament (Commencement) Act 1793.)
- Repealed: England and Wales: 1 January 1912; Scotland: 1 January 1913
Other legislation
Amended by	Wild Animals in Captivity Protection (Scotland) Act 1909
Repealed by	England and Wales: Protection of Animals Act 1911; Scotland: Protection of Animals (Scotland) Act 1912
Relates to	Cruelty to Animals Act 1849; Cruelty to Animals Act 1854; Cruelty to Animals Act 1876

Status: Repealed

Text of statute as originally enacted

The Wild Animals in Captivity Protection Act 1900 (63 & 64 Vict. c. 33), was an act of the Parliament of the United Kingdom, given royal assent on 6 August 1900 and since repealed.

Section 1 of the act provided that the act covered any animals not encompassed by the Cruelty to Animals Act 1849 (12 & 13 Vict. c. 92) and the Cruelty to Animals Act 1854 (17 & 18 Vict. c. 60).

Section 2 of the act made it an offence to cause, or permit to be caused, any unnecessary suffering to such an animal held in captivity.

Section 3 of the act provided that to "cruelly abuse, infuriate, tease, or terrify" it, or to permit another to do so, was also an offence. The penalty was imprisonment with or without hard labour for up to three months, or a fine of up to five pounds.

Section 3 of the act provided that action done in the course of killing or preparing an animal for food was exempt, as was any act permitted by the Cruelty to Animals Act 1876 (39 & 40 Vict. c. 77), or the hunting of any animal provided that it had not been released in a mutilated or injured state.

== Subsequent developments ==
The act was extended to Scotland by the Wild Animals in Captivity Protection (Scotland) Act 1909 (9 Edw. 7. c. 33).

The act was repealed for England and Wales and Northern Ireland by section 18 of, and the second schedule to, the Protection of Animals Act 1911 (1 & 2 Geo. 5. c. 27) and for Scotland by section 18(1) of the Protection of Animals (Scotland) Act 1912 (2 & 3 Geo. 5. c. 14).

== See also ==
- Wild Birds Protection Act 1902
- Animal welfare in the United Kingdom
