= Clive Hollands =

British animal protectionism activist

- Born: 26 April 1929; London
- Died: 16 November 1996 (aged 67); Edinburgh
- Occupations: Activist, writer

Clive Thomas Patrick Hollands (26 April 1929 – 16 November 1996) was an English animal protectionism activist and anti-vivisectionist who campaigned to improve animal welfare laws.

== Biography ==
Hollands was educated at St Mary's College in Liverpool. He served in the Royal Navy from 1946 to 1953. In the 1960s he took interest in animal welfare and realized that since most legislation results from pressure on Government to act, it is important for animal welfare organisations to become unified. Hollands joined the Scottish Society for the Prevention of Vivisection in 1966 as Assistant Secretary under Harvey Metcalfe. He became its secretary in 1970 and director in 1988. In 1976, he founded the Animal Welfare Year as chairman with the support of 67 animal welfare societies. He used Animal Welfare Year to arouse public interest and influence sympathetic MPs to support government action in revising and updating animal welfare legislation. The Animal Welfare Year defined its objective to "revise and bring up-to-date present legislation, and for the introduction of new legislation–Where the emphasis must be on the protection and wellbeing of animals and not on commercial interest or profit".

Hollands was an anti-vivisectionist. He supported the abolishment of animal experimentation but felt it was unrealistic to gain governmental support so worked to reform animal welfare laws. He was Secretary of the Committee for the Reform of Animal Experimentation. He was a member of the Farm Animal Welfare Council. He commented that the "best definition of animal welfare... embraces the concept of dignity: it means: according to animals the natural dignity which is their due as living sentient creatures".

Hollands was a vice-president of the RSPCA (1980–1982) and an advisory director of the World Society for the Protection of Animals. In recognition of his service to animal welfare, Hollands was awarded the Order of the British Empire in 1995.

== Animals (Scientific Procedures) Act 1986 ==
In 1977, Hollands with Douglas Houghton, Baron Houghton of Sowerby and Richard D. Ryder formed the General Election Co-ordinating Committee for Animal Protection (GECCAP). The GECCAP brought together representatives from the Committee for the Reform of Animal Experimentation, Farm Animal Welfare Co-Ordinating Executive, Humane Education Council, National Joint Equine Welfare Committee and the League Against Cruel Sports.

GECCAP aimed to "put animal into politics" by persuading the main political parties to include animal welfare policies in their election manifestos for the 1979 United Kingdom general election. Their campaign was successful as the Labour Party, Conservatives and Liberal Democrats published some commitments for the first time. All parties included a commitment to legislate a replacement for the Cruelty to Animals Act 1876 in their 1979 election manifestos. This led to the Animals (Scientific Procedures) Act of 1986.

Hollands worked under the Committee for the Reform of Animal Experimentation (CRAE) to reform the Cruelty to Animals Act 1876. In 1983, CRAE formed an alliance with the British Veterinary Association (BVA) and FRAME. CRAE was composed of mostly anti-vivisectionists but they campaigned for reform, not abolition of animal experimentation. By 1985 many of their suggestions had been incorporated into the government's proposals for new legislation. The outcome was the Animals (Scientific Procedures) Act 1986. The Act regulates any experimental or scientific procedure which may have the effect of causing a protected animal "pain, suffering, distress or lasting harm".

He a member of the Animal Procedures Committee that was created by the Animals (Scientific Procedures) Act 1986.

== Selected publications ==
- Compassion is the Bugler: The Struggle for Animal Rights (1980)
- Animal Rights in the Political Arena In Peter Singer. In Defense of Animals (1985)
- The Animals (scientific procedures) Act 1986 (The Lancet, 1986)
- Achieving the Achievable: A Review of Animals in Politics (Alternatives to Laboratory Animals, 1995)
