= List of acts of the Parliament of the United Kingdom from 1854 =

This is a complete list of acts of the Parliament of the United Kingdom for the year 1854.

Note that the first parliament of the United Kingdom was held in 1801; parliaments between 1707 and 1800 were either parliaments of Great Britain or of Ireland). For acts passed up until 1707, see the list of acts of the Parliament of England and the list of acts of the Parliament of Scotland. For acts passed from 1707 to 1800, see the list of acts of the Parliament of Great Britain. See also the list of acts of the Parliament of Ireland.

For acts of the devolved parliaments and assemblies in the United Kingdom, see the list of acts of the Scottish Parliament, the list of acts of the Northern Ireland Assembly, and the list of acts and measures of Senedd Cymru; see also the list of acts of the Parliament of Northern Ireland.

The number shown after each act's title is its chapter number. Acts passed before 1963 are cited using this number, preceded by the year(s) of the reign during which the relevant parliamentary session was held; thus the Union with Ireland Act 1800 is cited as "39 & 40 Geo. 3 c. 67", meaning the 67th act passed during the session that started in the 39th year of the reign of George III and which finished in the 40th year of that reign. Note that the modern convention is to use Arabic numerals in citations (thus "41 Geo. 3" rather than "41 Geo. III"). Acts of the last session of the Parliament of Great Britain and the first session of the Parliament of the United Kingdom are both cited as "41 Geo. 3".

Some of these acts have a short title. Some of these acts have never had a short title. Some of these acts have a short title given to them by later acts, such as by the Short Titles Act 1896.

== 17 & 18 Vict. ==
The second session of the 16th Parliament of the United Kingdom, which met from 31 January 1854 until 12 August 1854.

=== Public general acts ===
Short title	Citation	Royal assent
Long title
Assessed Taxes Act 1854 (repealed)	17 & 18 Vict. c. 1	17 February 1854
An Act to explain and amend an Act of the last Session relating to the Duties of Assessed Taxes; and to authorize Justices of the Peace in Ireland to administer Oaths required in Matters relating to Income Tax. (Repealed by Revenue Act 1869 (32 & 33 Vict. c. 14) and Taxes Management Act 1880 (43 & 44 Vict. c. 19))
Supply Act 1854 (repealed)	17 & 18 Vict. c. 2	23 March 1854
An Act to apply the Sum of Eight Millions out of the Consolidated Fund to the Service of the Year One thousand eight hundred and fifty-four. (Repealed by Statute Law Revision Act 1875 (38 & 39 Vict. c. 66))
Exchequer Bills Act 1854 (repealed)	17 & 18 Vict. c. 3	23 March 1854
An Act for raising the Sum of One million seven hundred and fifty thousand Pounds by Exchequer Bills, for the Service of the Year One thousand eight hundred and fifty-four. (Repealed by Statute Law Revision Act 1875 (38 & 39 Vict. c. 66))
Mutiny Act 1854 (repealed)	17 & 18 Vict. c. 4	23 March 1854
An Act for punishing Mutiny and Desertion, and for the better Payment of the Army and their Quarters. (Repealed by Statute Law Revision Act 1875 (38 & 39 Vict. c. 66))
Coasting Trade Act 1854 (repealed)	17 & 18 Vict. c. 5	23 March 1854
An Act to admit Foreign Ships to the Coasting Trade. (Repealed by Supplemental Customs Consolidation Act 1855 (18 & 19 Vict. c. 96))
Marine Mutiny Act 1854 (repealed)	17 & 18 Vict. c. 6	23 March 1854
An Act for the Regulation of Her Majesty's Royal Marine Forces while on shore. (Repealed by Statute Law Revision Act 1875 (38 & 39 Vict. c. 66))
Highways, South Wales Act 1854 (repealed)	17 & 18 Vict. c. 7	12 May 1854
An Act for extending the Time limited for putting into execution the Act of the Fourteenth and Fifteenth Years of Her present Majesty, (Note: Highways, South Wales Act 1851 (14 & 15 Vict. c. 16)) for the better Management and Control of Highways in South Wales. (Repealed by Statute Law Revision Act 1875 (38 & 39 Vict. c. 66))
Valuation (Ireland) Act 1854 (repealed)	17 & 18 Vict. c. 8	12 May 1854
An Act further to amend an Act relating to the Valuation of rateable Property in Ireland. (Repealed by Rates (Northern Ireland) Order 1972 (SI 1972/1633 (N.I. 16)))
Annual Inclosure Act 1854	17 & 18 Vict. c. 9	12 May 1854
An Act to authorise the Inclosure of certain Lands in pursuance of a Report of the Inclosure Commissioners for England and Wales.
Income Tax Act 1854 (repealed)	17 & 18 Vict. c. 10	12 May 1854
An Act for granting to Her Majesty additional Duties on Profits arising from Property, Professions, Trades, and Offices. (Repealed by Statute Law Revision Act 1875 (38 & 39 Vict. c. 66))
Church Temporalities Act 1854	17 & 18 Vict. c. 11	12 May 1854
An Act to amend the Laws relating to Ministers Money, and the Church Temporalities (Ireland) Act. (Note: Church Temporalities (Ireland) Act 1833 (3 & 4 Will. 4. c. 37))
Exchequer Bills Act 1854 (repealed)	17 & 18 Vict. c. 12	12 May 1854
An Act for raising the Sum of Sixteen millions twenty-four thousand one hundred Pounds by Exchequer Bills, for the Service of the Year One thousand eight hundred and fifty-four. (Repealed by Statute Law Revision Act 1875 (38 & 39 Vict. c. 66))
Militia Act 1854 (repealed)	17 & 18 Vict. c. 13	12 May 1854
An Act to amend the Acts relating to the Militia of the United Kingdom. (Repealed by Militia (Voluntary Enlistment) Act 1875 (38 & 39 Vict. c. 69))
Church Building Commission Act 1854 (repealed)	17 & 18 Vict. c. 14	12 May 1854
An Act to continue Her Majesty's Commission for building new Churches. (Repealed by Statute Law Revision Act 1875 (38 & 39 Vict. c. 66))
Tunnel between Devonport and Keyham Act 1854	17 & 18 Vict. c. 15	2 June 1854
An Act to empower the Commissioners of the Admiralty to construct a Tunnel between Her Majesty's Dockyard at Devonport and Her Majesty's Steam Factory Yard at Keyham, and to acquire certain Property for Her Majesty's Service.
County Courts Act 1854 (repealed)	17 & 18 Vict. c. 16	2 June 1854
An Act to amend the Act of the Thirteenth and Fourteenth Victoria, Chapter Sixty-one, (Note: County Courts Act 1850 (13 & 14 Vict. c. 61)) and the Act of the Fifteenth and Sixteenth Victoria, Chapter Fifty-four. (Note: County Courts Act 1852 (15 & 16 Vict. c. 54)) (Repealed by Statute Law Revision Act 1875 (38 & 39 Vict. c. 66))
Boundary Survey (Ireland) Act 1854	17 & 18 Vict. c. 17	2 June 1854
An Act to make further Provision for defining the Boundaries of Counties, Baronies, Half Baronies, Parishes, Town Lands, and other Divisions and Denominations of Land in Ireland for public Purposes.
Prize Act, Russia, 1854 or the Prize (Russia) Act 1854 (repealed)	17 & 18 Vict. c. 18	2 June 1854
An Act for the Encouragement of Seamen and the more effectual Manning of Her Majesty's Navy during the present War. (Repealed by Naval Prize Acts Repeal Act 1864 (27 & 28 Vict. c. 23))
Naval Pay and Prize Act 1854 or the Navy Pay and Prize Act 1854 (Note: The bill for this act was the Navy Pay Bill or the Navy Pay, etc., Bill.) (repealed)	17 & 18 Vict. c. 19	2 June 1854
An Act for facilitating the Payment of Her Majesty's Navy, and the Payment and Distribution of Prize, Bounty, Salvage, and other Monies to and amongst the Officers and Crews of Her Majesty's Ships and Vessels of War; and for the better Regulation of the Accounts relating thereto. (Repealed for the United Kingdom by Exchequer and Audit Departments Act 1866 (29 & 30 Vict. c. 39) and for the Isle of Man by Statute Law (Repeals) Act 2004 (c. 14))
Manchester Division Stipendiary Justice Act 1854 or the Stipendiary Magistrate, Manchester and Salford Act 1854 (repealed)	17 & 18 Vict. c. 20	2 June 1854
An Act to repeal an Act of the Fifty-third Year of King George the Third, Chapter Seventy-two, (Note: Manchester Stipendiary Magistrate Act 1813 (53 Geo. 3. c. 72)) and an Act of the Eighth Year of Her present Majesty, Chapter Twenty-one; (Note: Manchester Stipendiary Magistrate Act 1845 (8 & 9 Vict. c. 21)) and for making Provision for the Appointment and for Remuneration of a Stipendiary Justice for the Division of Manchester in the County of Lancaster, and of Clerks to such Justice and the Justices for the Borough of Salford; and for other Purposes. (Repealed by Manchester Division and Borough of Salford (Stipendiary Justices) Act 1878 (41 & 42 Vict. c. lv))
Supply Act 1854 (repealed)	17 & 18 Vict. c. 21	16 June 1854
An Act to apply the Sum of Eight Millions out of the Consolidated Fund to the Service of the Year One thousand eight hundred and fifty-four. (Repealed by Statute Law Revision Act 1875 (38 & 39 Vict. c. 66))
Port of Dublin Act 1854 (repealed)	17 & 18 Vict. c. 22	16 June 1854
An Act to enable the Collector General of Dublin to levy Money to repay a certain Outlay by the Corporation for preserving and improving the Port of Dublin in and about repairing the Quay Wall of the River Liffey, and for future Repairs thereof, and for repairing and rebuilding Bridges over the said River. (Repealed by Dublin Port and Docks Act 1869 (32 & 33 Vict. c. c))
Exchequer Bonds and Bills Act 1854 (repealed)	17 & 18 Vict. c. 23	16 June 1854
An Act for raising the Sum of Six Millions by Exchequer Bonds and Exchequer Bills. (Repealed by Statute Law Revision Act 1875 (38 & 39 Vict. c. 66))
Income Tax Act 1854 (repealed)	17 & 18 Vict. c. 24	16 June 1854
An Act for granting to Her Majesty an increased Rate of Duty on Profits arising from Property, Professions, Trades, and Offices. (Repealed by Income Tax Act 1918 (8 & 9 Geo. 5. c. 40))
Industrial and Provident Societies Act 1854 (repealed)	17 & 18 Vict. c. 25	16 June 1854
An Act to amend the Industrial and Provident Societies Act, 1852. (Repealed by Industrial and Provident Societies Act 1862 (25 & 26 Vict. c. 87))
Treason (Ireland) Act 1854 (repealed)	17 & 18 Vict. c. 26	3 July 1854
An Act to assimilate the Law and Practice existing in cases of High Treason in Ireland to the Law and Practice existing in Cases of High Treason in England. (Repealed by Treason Act 1945 (8 & 9 Geo. 6. c. 44))
Excise Act 1854 (repealed)	17 & 18 Vict. c. 27	3 July 1854
An Act for granting certain additional Rates and Duties of Excise. (Repealed by Inland Revenue Act 1880 (43 & 44 Vict. c. 20))
Customs Act 1854 (repealed)	17 & 18 Vict. c. 28	3 July 1854
An Act to alter and amend certain Duties of Customs. (Repealed by Customs Tariff Act 1855 (18 & 19 Vict. c. 97))
Customs (No. 2) Act 1854 (repealed)	17 & 18 Vict. c. 29	10 July 1854
An Act to alter the Duties of Customs on Sugar, Molasses, and Spirits. (Repealed by Customs Tariff Act 1855 (18 & 19 Vict. c. 97))
Sugar Duties Act 1854 (repealed)	17 & 18 Vict. c. 30	10 July 1854
An Act for granting certain Duties of Excise on Sugar made in the United Kingdom. (Repealed by Inland Revenue Act 1880 (43 & 44 Vict. c. 20))
Railway and Canal Traffic Act 1854 (repealed)	17 & 18 Vict. c. 31	10 July 1854
An Act for the better Regulation of the Traffic on Railways and Canals. (Repealed by Transport Act 1962 (10 & 11 Eliz. 2. c. 46))
Church Building Act 1854 (repealed)	17 & 18 Vict. c. 32	10 July 1854
An Act to facilitate the Apportionment of the Rent when Parts of Lands in Lease are taken for the Purposes of the Church Building Acts. (Repealed for the Isle of Man by Isle of Man (Church Building and New Parishes) Act 1897 (60 & 61 Vict. c. 33) and for the United Kingdom by Statute Law (Repeals) Act 1974 (c. 22))
Public Statues (Metropolis) Act 1854	17 & 18 Vict. c. 33	10 July 1854
An Act to place Public Statues within the Metropolitan Police District under the Control of the Commissioners of Her Majesty's Works and Public Buildings.
Attendance of Witnesses Act 1854	17 & 18 Vict. c. 34	10 July 1854
An Act to enable the Courts of Law in England, Ireland, and Scotland to issue Process to compel the Attendance of Witnesses out of their Jurisdiction, and to give Effect to the Service of such Process in any Part of the United Kingdom.
Warwick Assizes Act 1854 (repealed)	17 & 18 Vict. c. 35	10 July 1854
An Act to repeal certain Provisions of an Act of the Fifth and Six Years of Her present Majesty, (Note: Coventry Act 1842 (5 & 6 Vict. c. 110)) concerning the holding of Assizes for the County of Warwick. (Repealed by Statute Law Revision Act 1892 (55 & 56 Vict. c. 19))
Bills of Sale Act 1854 (repealed)	17 & 18 Vict. c. 36	10 July 1854
An Act for preventing Frauds upon Creditors by secret Bills of Sale of personal Chattels. (Repealed by Bills of Sale Act 1878 (41 & 42 Vict. c. 31))
Validity of Certain Proceedings, etc. Act 1854 (repealed)	17 & 18 Vict. c. 37	10 July 1854
An Act for establishing the Validity of certain Proceedings in Her Majesty's Court of Vice-Admiralty in Mauritius. (Repealed by Vice Admiralty Courts Act 1863 (26 & 27 Vict. c. 24))
Gaming Houses Act 1854 (repealed)	17 & 18 Vict. c. 38	24 July 1854
An Act for the Suppression of Gaming Houses. (Repealed for England and Wales and Scotland by Betting and Gaming Act 1960 (8 & 9 Eliz. 2. c. 60) and for Northern Ireland by Betting, Gaming, Lotteries and Amusements (Northern Ireland) Order 1985 (SI 1985/1204))
Indemnity Act 1854 (repealed)	17 & 18 Vict. c. 39	24 July 1854
An Act to indemnify such Persons in the United Kingdom as have omitted to qualify themselves for Offices and Employments, and to extend the Time limited for those Purposes respectively. (Repealed by Promissory Oaths Act 1871 (34 & 35 Vict. c. 48))
Income Tax Act 1854 (repealed)	17 & 18 Vict. c. 40	24 July 1854
An Act to continue an Act of the last Session of Parliament, (Note: Income Tax (Insurance) Act 1853 (16 & 17 Vict. c. 91)) for extending for a limited Time the Provision for Abatement of Income Tax in respect of Insurance on Lives. (Repealed by Statute Law Revision Act 1875 (38 & 39 Vict. c. 66))
Poor Law Board Act 1854 (repealed)	17 & 18 Vict. c. 41	24 July 1854
An Act to continue the Poor Law Board. (Repealed by Statute Law Revision Act 1875 (38 & 39 Vict. c. 66))
Turnpike Acts (Ireland) Act 1854 (repealed)	17 & 18 Vict. c. 42	24 July 1854
An Act to continue certain Acts for regulating Turnpike Roads in Ireland. (Repealed by Statute Law Revision Act 1875 (38 & 39 Vict. c. 66))
Poor Law Union Charges Act 1854 (repealed)	17 & 18 Vict. c. 43	24 July 1854
An Act to continue an Act of the Seventeenth Year of Her present Majesty, (Note: Poor Law Union Charges Act 1853 (16 & 17 Vict. c. 77)) for charging the Maintenance of certain poor Persons in Unions in England and Wales upon the Common Fund. (Repealed by Statute Law Revision Act 1875 (38 & 39 Vict. c. 66))
Holyhead Harbours Act 1854	17 & 18 Vict. c. 44	24 July 1854
An Act for regulating and maintaining the Harbours of Holyhead, and for vesting them in the Admiralty.
Dublin Amended Carriage Act 1854 (repealed)	17 & 18 Vict. c. 45	24 July 1854
An Act to amend the Dublin Carriage Act, 1853. (Note: Dublin Carriage Act 1853 (16 & 17 Vict. c. 112)) (Repealed by Statute Law (Repeals) Act 2013 (c. 2))
Linen, etc., Manufacturers (Ireland) Act 1854 (repealed)	17 & 18 Vict. c. 46	24 July 1854
An Act to continue certain Acts relating to Linen, Hempen, and other Manufactures in Ireland. (Repealed by Statute Law Revision Act 1875 (38 & 39 Vict. c. 66))
Ecclesiastical Courts Act 1854 (repealed)	17 & 18 Vict. c. 47	24 July 1854
An Act to alter and Improve the Mode of taking Evidence in the Ecclesiastical Courts of England and Wales. (Repealed by Ecclesiastical Jurisdiction Measure 1963 (No. 1))
Second Annual Inclosure Act 1854	17 & 18 Vict. c. 48	24 July 1854
An Act to authorize the Inclosure of certain Lands in pursuance of a Special Report of the Inclosure Commissioners for England and Wales.
New Forest Act 1854 (repealed)	17 & 18 Vict. c. 49	24 July 1854
An Act for the Settlement of Claims upon and over the New Forest. (Repealed by Wild Creatures and Forest Laws Act 1971 (c. 47))
Savings Banks and Friendly Societies Act 1854 (repealed)	17 & 18 Vict. c. 50	24 July 1854
An Act to continue an Act of the Twelfth Year of Her present Majesty, (Note: Savings Banks (Ireland) Act 1848 (11 & 12 Vict. c. 133)) for amending the Laws relating to Savings Banks in Ireland, and to authorize Friendly Societies to invest the whole of their Funds in Savings Banks. (Repealed by Statute Law Revision Act 1875 (38 & 39 Vict. c. 66))
Provisional Order Confirmation (Turnpikes) Act 1854 (repealed)	17 & 18 Vict. c. 51	31 July 1854
An Act to confirm certain Provisional Orders made under an Act of the Fifteenth Year of Her present Majesty, to facilitate Arrangements for the Belief of Turnpike Trusts, and to make certain Provisions respecting Exemptions from Tolls. (Repealed by Statute Law (Repeals) Act 1981 (c. 19))
Highway Rates Act 1854 (repealed)	17 & 18 Vict. c. 52	31 July 1854
An Act to continue an Act for authorizing the Application of Highway Rates to Turnpike Roads. (Repealed by Statute Law Revision Act 1875 (38 & 39 Vict. c. 66))
Public Health Supplemental Act 1854	17 & 18 Vict. c. 53	31 July 1854
An Act to confirm Provisional Orders of the General Board of Health for the Districts of Plymouth, Haworth, Aberdare, Bishop Auckland, Willenhall, and Over Darwen.
	Provisional Order for the Application of the Public Health Act (Note: Public Health Act 1848) to the Borough of Plymouth, in the County of Devon.	
	Provisional Order for altering the Boundaries of the District of Haworth in the West Riding of the County of York, as constituted for the Purposes of the Public Health Act 1848.	
	Provisional Order for the Application of the Public Health Act, 1848, to the Parish of Aberdare, in the County of Glamorgan.	
	Provisional Order for the Application of the Public Health Act to the District of Bishop Auckland, in the County of Durham.	
	Provisional Order for the Application of the Public Health Act to the Township of Willenhall, in the County of Stafford.	
	Provisional Order for the Application of the Public Health Act to the Township of Over Darwen, in the County Palatine of Lancaster.	
Jamaica Loan Act 1854 (repealed)	17 & 18 Vict. c. 54	31 July 1854
An Act to guarantee the Liquidation or a Loan or Loans for the Service of the Colony of Jamaica. (Repealed by Jamaica Loans Act 1869 (32 & 33 Vict. c. 69))
Bills of Sale (Ireland) Act 1854 (repealed)	17 & 18 Vict. c. 55	31 July 1854
An Act for the Registration of Bills of Sale in Ireland. (Repealed by Bills of Sale (Ireland) Act 1879 (42 & 43 Vict. c. 50))
Friendly Societies Discharge Act 1854 (repealed)	17 & 18 Vict. c. 56	31 July 1854
An Act to make further Provisions in relation to certain Friendly Societies. (Repealed by Statute Law Revision Act 1875 (38 & 39 Vict. c. 66) and Statute Law Revision Act 1950 (14 Geo. 6. c. 6))
Returning Officers Act 1854 (repealed)	17 & 18 Vict. c. 57	31 July 1854
An Act to amend the Law relating to the Appointment of Returning Officers in certain Cases. (Repealed by Parliament (Elections and Meeting) Act 1943 (6 & 7 Geo. 6. c. 48))
Annual Turnpike Acts Continuance Act 1854 or the Turnpike Roads (England) Act 1854 (repealed)	17 & 18 Vict. c. 58	31 July 1854
An Act to continue certain Turnpike Acts in Great Britain, and to make further Provisions concerning Turnpike Roads in England. (Repealed by Statute Law (Repeals) Act 1981 (c. 19))
Jury Trials (Scotland) Act 1854 (repealed)	17 & 18 Vict. c. 59	31 July 1854
An Act to allow Verdicts on Trials by Jury in Civil Causes in Scotland to be returned although the Jury may not be unanimous. (Repealed by Statute Law Revision Act 1892 (55 & 56 Vict. c. 19))
Cruelty to Animals Act 1854 (repealed)	17 & 18 Vict. c. 60	31 July 1854
An Act to amend an Act of the Twelfth and Thirteenth Years of Her present Majesty (Note: Cruelty to Animals Act 1849 (12 & 13 Vict. c. 92)) for the more effectual Prevention of Cruelty to Animals. (Repealed for England and Wales and Ireland by Protection of Animals Act 1911 (1 & 2 Geo. 5. c. 27) and for Scotland by Protection of Animals (Scotland) Act 1912 (2 & 3 Geo. 5. c. 14))
Royal Military Asylum, Chelsea Act 1854 (repealed)	17 & 18 Vict. c. 61	31 July 1854
An Act to authorize the Application of a Sum of Money out of the forfeited and unclaimed Army Prize Fund in enlarging and improving the Royal Military Asylum. (Repealed by Statute Law Revision Act 1875 (38 & 39 Vict. c. 66))
Heritable Securities (Scotland) Act 1854 (repealed)	17 & 18 Vict. c. 62	31 July 1854
An Act to extend the Benefits of Two Acts of Her Majesty relating to the Constitution, Transmission, and Extinction of Heritable Securities in Scotland. (Repealed by Titles to Land Consolidation (Scotland) Act 1868 (31 & 32 Vict. c. 101))
Poor Law Board (Ireland) Act 1854 (repealed)	17 & 18 Vict. c. 63	31 July 1854
An Act to continue the Poor Law Commission for Ireland. (Repealed by Statute Law Revision Act 1875 (38 & 39 Vict. c. 66))
Public Libraries Act (Scotland) 1854 or the Public Libraries (Scotland) Act 1854 (repealed)	17 & 18 Vict. c. 64	31 July 1854
An Act to amend an Act of the last Session for extending the Public Libraries Act, 1850, to Ireland and Scotland. (Repealed by Public Libraries Act (Scotland) 1867 (30 & 31 Vict. c. 37))
Ecclesiastical Jurisdiction Act 1854 (repealed)	17 & 18 Vict. c. 65	31 July 1854
An Act for further continuing certain temporary Provisions concerning Ecclesiastical Jurisdiction in England. (Repealed by Statute Law Revision Act 1875 (38 & 39 Vict. c. 66))
Poor Rates Act 1854 (repealed)	17 & 18 Vict. c. 66	31 July 1854
An Act to continue the Exemption of Inhabitants from Liability to be rated as such in respect of Stock in Trade or other Property to the Relief of the Poor. (Repealed by Statute Law Revision Act 1875 (38 & 39 Vict. c. 66))
Defence Act 1854	17 & 18 Vict. c. 67	31 July 1854
An Act to facilitate the Purchase of Common, Commonable, and other Rights by the Principal Officers of Her Majesty's Ordnance.
Crown Land, Revenues Act 1854	17 & 18 Vict. c. 68	31 July 1854
An Act to provide for the Application of certain Stock purchased with Monies which arose from the Sale of Part of the Land Revenues of the Crown in Ireland.
Local Boards Highway Repair Indemnity Act 1854 or the Highways Act 1854 (repealed)	17 & 18 Vict. c. 69	31 July 1854
An Act to indemnify Local Boards of Health as regards rating for the Repair of Highways, under the Public Health Act, 1848. (Repealed by Statute Law Revision Act 1875 (38 & 39 Vict. c. 66))
Marylebone Chapels Act 1854 (repealed)	17 & 18 Vict. c. 70	31 July 1854
An Act to enable the Trustees of Portland Chapel, Oxford Chapel, and Welbeck Chapel, in the Parish of Saint Marylebone, to augment the Salaries of the Ministers of the said Chapels. (Repealed by Marylebone Chapels (Saint James Westmoreland Street) Act 1904 (4 Edw. 7. c. xlvi) and Marylebone Chapels (Saint Paul Great Portland Street and Saint Peter Vere Street) Act 1905 (5 Edw. 7. c. vii))
Borough Rates (England) Act 1854 (repealed)	17 & 18 Vict. c. 71	31 July 1854
An Act to amend the Law concerning the making of Borough Rates in Boroughs not within the Municipal Corporation Act. (Repealed by Municipal Corporations Act 1883 (46 & 47 Vict. c. 18))
Sheriff and Sheriff Clerk of Chancery (Scotland) Act 1854 (repealed)	17 & 18 Vict. c. 72	31 July 1854
An Act to provide for Payment of the Salaries of the Sheriff and Sheriff Clerk of Chancery in Scotland. (Repealed by Statute Law Revision Act 1875 (38 & 39 Vict. c. 66))
Bankers (Scotland) Act 1854	17 & 18 Vict. c. 73	31 July 1854
An Act to amend the Acts for the Regulation of Joint Stock Banks in Scotland.
Reformatory Schools (Scotland) Act 1854 (repealed)	17 & 18 Vict. c. 74	7 August 1854
An Act to render Reformatory and Industrial Schools in Scotland more available for the Benefit of Vagrant Children. (Repealed by Industrial Schools (Scotland) Act 1861 (24 & 25 Vict. c. 132))
Acknowledgement of Deeds by Married Women Act 1854 (repealed)	17 & 18 Vict. c. 75	7 August 1854
An Act to remove Doubts concerning the due Acknowledgment of Deeds by Married Women in certain Cases. (Repealed by Conveyancing Act 1882 (45 & 46 Vict. c. 39))
Convict Prisons (Ireland) Act 1854 or the Convict Prisons Act 1854	17 & 18 Vict. c. 76	7 August 1854
An Act for the Formation, Regulation, and Government of Convict Prisons in Ireland.
Government of India Act 1854 (repealed)	17 & 18 Vict. c. 77	7 August 1854
An Act to provide for the Mode of passing Letters Patent and other Acts of the Crown relating to India, and for vesting certain Powers in the Governor General of India in Council. (Repealed by Government of India Act 1915 (5 & 6 Geo. 5. c. 61))
Admiralty Court Act 1854 or the Court of Admiralty Act 1854 (repealed)	17 & 18 Vict. c. 78	7 August 1854
An Act to appoint Persons to administer Oaths, and to substitute Stamps in lieu of Fees, and for other Purposes, in the High Court of Admiralty of England. (Repealed by Statute Law Revision Act 1892 (55 & 56 Vict. c. 19))
Sale of Beer Act 1854 or the Sale of Beer, etc. Act 1854 (repealed)	17 & 18 Vict. c. 79	7 August 1854
An Act for further regulating the Sale of Beer and other Liquors on the Lord's Day. (Repealed by Intoxicating Liquors Act 1855 (18 & 19 Vict. c. 118))
Registration of Births, Deaths, and Marriages (Scotland) Act 1854 (repealed)	17 & 18 Vict. c. 80	7 August 1854
An Act to provide for the better Registration of Births, Deaths, and Marriages in Scotland. (Repealed by Registration of Births, Deaths and Marriages (Scotland) Act 1965 (c. 49))
Oxford University Act 1854 or the Oxford University Reform Act 1854 or the University Reform Act 1854	17 & 18 Vict. c. 81	7 August 1854
An Act to make further Provision for the good Government and Extension of the University of Oxford, of the Colleges therein, and of the College of Saint Mary Winchester.
Court of Chancery of Lancaster Act 1854 (repealed)	17 & 18 Vict. c. 82	7 August 1854
An Act further to improve the Administration of Justice in the Court of Chancery of the County Palatine of Lancaster. (Repealed by Courts Act 1971 (c. 23))
Stamp Act 1854 or Stamp Duties Act 1854	17 & 18 Vict. c. 83	10 August 1854
An Act to amend the Laws relating to the Stamp Duties. (Repealed for England and Wales by Statute Law (Repeals) Act 1971 (c. 52))
Augmentation of Benefices Act 1854 (repealed)	17 & 18 Vict. c. 84	10 August 1854
An Act to extend the Provisions of the Acts for the Augmentation of Benefices. (Repealed by Statute Law (Repeals) Act 1971 (c. 52))
Land, Assessed, and Income Taxes Act 1854 (repealed)	17 & 18 Vict. c. 85	10 August 1854
An Act for better securing the collecting and accounting for the Land Tax, Assessed Taxes and Income Tax by the Collectors thereof. (Repealed by Taxes Management Act 1880 (43 & 44 Vict. c. 19))
Youthful Offenders Act 1854 or the Youthful Offenders, Great Britain Act 1854 or the Reformatory Schools Act 1854 (repealed)	17 & 18 Vict. c. 86	10 August 1854
An Act for the better Care and Reformation of Youthful Offenders in Great Britain. (Repealed by Reformatory Schools Act 1866 (29 & 30 Vict. c. 117))
Burial Act 1854 or the Extramural Interment Act 1854 (repealed)	17 & 18 Vict. c. 87	10 August 1854
An Act to make further Provision for the Burial of the Dead in England beyond the Limits of the Metropolis. (Repealed by Local Government Act 1972 (c. 70))
Confirmation of Marriages Act 1854 (repealed)	17 & 18 Vict. c. 88	10 August 1854
An Act to render valid certain Marriages of British Subjects in Mexico. (Repealed by Foreign Marriage (Amendment) Act 1988 (c. 44))
Spirits (Ireland) Act 1854 (repealed)	17 & 18 Vict. c. 89	10 August 1854
An Act to amend the Laws for the better Prevention of the Sale of Spirits by unlicenced Persons, and for the Suppression of illicit Distillation, in Ireland. (Repealed by Statute Law (Repeals) Act 1977 (c. 18))
Usury Laws Repeal Act 1854 (repealed)	17 & 18 Vict. c. 90	10 August 1854
An Act to repeal the Laws relating to Usury, and to the Enrolment of Annuities. (Repealed by Statute Law (Repeals) Act 1976 (c. 16))
Lands Valuation (Scotland) Act 1854	17 & 18 Vict. c. 91	10 August 1854
An Act for the Valuation of Lands and Heritages in Scotland.
Crime and Outrage (Ireland) Act 1854 (repealed)	17 & 18 Vict. c. 92	10 August 1854
An Act to continue an Act of the Eleventh Year of Her present Majesty, for the better Prevention of Crime and Outrage in certain Parts of Ireland. (Repealed by Statute Law Revision Act 1875 (38 & 39 Vict. c. 66))
Duchy of Cornwall Office Act 1854	17 & 18 Vict. c. 93	10 August 1854
An Act for the Exchange of the Office in Somerset House of the Duchy of Cornwall for an Office to be erected in Pimlico on the Hereditary Possessions of the Crown.
Public Revenue and Consolidated Fund Charges Act 1854	17 & 18 Vict. c. 94	10 August 1854
An Act to alter the Mode of providing for certain Expenses now charged upon certain Branches of the Public Revenues and upon the Consolidated Fund.
Public Health Act 1854 (repealed)	17 & 18 Vict. c. 95	10 August 1854
An Act to make better Provision for the Administration of the Laws relating to the Public Health. (Repealed by Statute Law Revision Act 1875 (38 & 39 Vict. c. 66))
Gold and Silver Wares Act 1854 (repealed)	17 & 18 Vict. c. 96	10 August 1854
An Act for allowing Gold Wares to be manufactured at a lower Standard than that now allowed by Law, and to amend the Law relating to the assaying of Gold and Silver Wares. (Repealed by Hallmarking Act 1973 (c. 43))
Inclosure Act 1854	17 & 18 Vict. c. 97	10 August 1854
An Act to amend and extend the Acts for the Inclosure, Exchange, and Improvement of Land.
Parochial Schoolmaster (Scotland) Act 1854 (repealed)	17 & 18 Vict. c. 98	10 August 1854
An Act to regulate the Salaries of the Parochial Schoolmasters of Scotland. (Repealed by Statute Law Revision Act 1875 (38 & 39 Vict. c. 66))
National Gallery of Ireland Act 1854	17 & 18 Vict. c. 99	10 August 1854
An Act to provide for the Establishment of a National Gallery of Paintings, Sculpture, and the Fine Arts, for the Care of a Public Library, and the Erection of a Public Museum, in Dublin.
Court of Chancery Act 1854 (repealed)	17 & 18 Vict. c. 100	10 August 1854
An Act to make further Provision for the more speedy and efficient Despatch of Business in the High Court of Chancery. (Repealed by Statute Law Revision Act 1875 (38 & 39 Vict. c. 66))
Friendly Societies Act 1854 (repealed)	17 & 18 Vict. c. 101	10 August 1854
An Act to continue and amend the Acts now in force relating to Friendly Societies. (Repealed by Friendly Societies Act 1855 (18 & 19 Vict. c. 63))
Corrupt Practices Prevention Act 1854 (repealed)	17 & 18 Vict. c. 102	10 August 1854
An Act to consolidate and amend the Laws relating to Bribery, Treating, and undue Influence at Elections of Members of Parliament. (Repealed by Representation of the People Act 1949 (12, 13 & 14 Geo. 6. c. 68))
Towns Improvement (Ireland) Act 1854	17 & 18 Vict. c. 103	10 August 1854
An Act to make better Provision for the paving, lighting, draining, cleansing, supplying with Water, and Regulation of Towns in Ireland.
Merchant Shipping Act 1854 or the Imperial Shipping Act 1854 (repealed)	17 & 18 Vict. c. 104	10 August 1854
An Act to amend and consolidate the Acts relating to Merchant Shipping. (Repealed by Merchant Shipping Act 1894 (57 & 58 Vict. c. 60))
Militia Law Amendment Act 1854 (repealed)	17 & 18 Vict. c. 105	11 August 1854
An Act to amend the Laws relating to the Militia in England and Wales. (Repealed by Territorial Army and Militia Act 1921 (11 & 12 Geo. 5. c. 37))
Militia (Scotland) Act 1854 (repealed)	17 & 18 Vict. c. 106	11 August 1854
An Act for amending the Laws relating to the Militia, and raising a Volunteer Force, in Scotland. (Repealed by Territorial Army and Militia Act 1921 (11 & 12 Geo. 5. c. 37))
Militia (Ireland) Act 1854 (repealed)	17 & 18 Vict. c. 107	11 August 1854
An Act to amend the Laws relating to the Militia, and for raising a Volunteer Militia Force, in Ireland. (Repealed by Territorial Army and Militia Act 1921 (11 & 12 Geo. 5. c. 37))
Militia Ballots Suspension Act 1854 (repealed)	17 & 18 Vict. c. 108	11 August 1854
An Act to suspend the making of Lists and the Ballots for the Militia of the United Kingdom. (Repealed by Statute Law Revision Act 1875 (38 & 39 Vict. c. 66))
Militia Pay Act 1854 (repealed)	17 & 18 Vict. c. 109	11 August 1854
An Act to defray the Charge of the Pay, Clothing, and contingent and other Expenses of the Disembodied Militia in Great Britain and Ireland; to grant Allowances in certain Cases to Subaltern Officers, Adjutants, Paymasters, Quartermasters, Surgeons, Assistant Surgeons, Surgeons Mates, and Sergeant Majors of the Militia; and to authorize the Employment of the Non-commissioned Officers. (Repealed by Statute Law Revision Act 1875 (38 & 39 Vict. c. 66))
Advances to County of Mayo Act 1854 (repealed)	17 & 18 Vict. c. 110	11 August 1854
An Act to provide for the Repayment of Monies advanced from the Exchequer to the County of Mayo for Public Purposes. (Repealed by Statute Law Revision Act 1875 (38 & 39 Vict. c. 66))
Metropolitan Sewers Act 1854 (repealed)	17 & 18 Vict. c. 111	11 August 1854
An Act to continue and amend the Metropolitan Sewers Acts. (Repealed by Statute Law Revision Act 1875 (38 & 39 Vict. c. 66))
Literary and Scientific Institutions Act 1854	17 & 18 Vict. c. 112	11 August 1854
An Act to afford greater Facilities for the Establishment of Institutions for the Promotion of Literature and Science and the Fine Arts, and to provide for their better Regulation.
Real Estate Charges Act 1854 (repealed)	17 & 18 Vict. c. 113	11 August 1854
An Act to amend the Law relating to the Administration of the Estates of deceased Persons. (Repealed by Administration of Estates Act 1925 (15 & 16 Geo. 5. c. 23))
University of London Medical Graduates Act 1854 (repealed)	17 & 18 Vict. c. 114	11 August 1854
An Act to extend the Rights enjoyed by the Graduates of the Universities of Oxford and Cambridge in respect to the Practice of Physic to the Graduates of the University of London. (Repealed by Statute Law (Repeals) Act 1977 (c. 18))
Removal of Prisoners in Custody Act 1854 (repealed)	17 & 18 Vict. c. 115	11 August 1854
An Act to amend the Law relative to the Removal of Prisoners in Custody. (Repealed by Statute Law Revision Act 1892 (55 & 56 Vict. c. 19))
Episcopal and Capitular Estates Act 1854 (repealed)	17 & 18 Vict. c. 116	11 August 1854
An Act to continue and amend an Act to facilitate the Management and Improvement of Episcopal and Capitular Estates in England. (Repealed by Statute Law Revision Act 1964 (c. 79))
West Indian Incumbered Estates Act 1854 (repealed)	17 & 18 Vict. c. 117	11 August 1854
An Act to facilitate the Sale and Transfer of Incumbered Estates in the West Indies. (Repealed by West Indian Incumbered Estates Act 1886 (49 & 50 Vict. c. 36))
Commonwealth Legislative Council for Canada Act 1854	17 & 18 Vict. c. 118	11 August 1854
An Act to empower the Legislature of Canada to alter the Constitution of the Legislative Council for that Province, and for other Purposes.
Bankruptcy Act 1854 (repealed)	17 & 18 Vict. c. 119	11 August 1854
An Act for regulating Appointments to Offices in the Court of Bankruptcy, and for amending the Laws relating to Bankrupts. (Repealed by Bankruptcy Repeal and Insolvent Court Act 1869 (32 & 33 Vict. c. 83))
Merchant Shipping Repeal Act 1854	17 & 18 Vict. c. 120	11 August 1854
An Act to repeal certain Acts and Parts of Acts relating to Merchant Shipping, and to continue certain Provisions in the said Acts.
Appropriation Act 1854 (repealed)	17 & 18 Vict. c. 121	12 August 1854
An Act to apply a Sum out of the Consolidated Fund and certain other Sums to the Service of the Year One thousand eight hundred and fifty-four, and to appropriate the Supplies granted in this Session of Parliament. (Repealed by Statute Law Revision Act 1875 (38 & 39 Vict. c. 66))
Customs Act 1854 (repealed)	17 & 18 Vict. c. 122	12 August 1854
An Act for the further Alteration and Amendment of the Laws and Duties of Customs. (Repealed by Supplemental Customs Consolidation Act 1855 (18 & 19 Vict. c. 96))
Russian Government Securities Act 1854 (repealed)	17 & 18 Vict. c. 123	12 August 1854
An Act to render any Dealing with Securities issued during the present War between Russia and England by the Russian Government a Misdemeanor. (Repealed by Statute Law Revision Act 1875 (38 & 39 Vict. c. 66))
Midland Great Western Railway Act 1854	17 & 18 Vict. c. 124	12 August 1854
An Act to settle the Contribution to be made by certain Baronies in Roscommon and Galway and the County of the Town of Galway to the Midland Great Western Railway of Ireland Company.
Common Law Procedure Act 1854	17 & 18 Vict. c. 125	12 August 1854
An Act for the further Amendment of the Process, Practice, and Mode of Pleading in and enlarging the Jurisdiction of the Superior Courts of Common Law at Westminster, and of the Superior Courts of Common Law of the Counties Palatine of Lancaster and Durham.

=== Local acts ===
Short title	Citation	Royal assent
Long title
Middleton Gas Act 1854	17 & 18 Vict. c. i	12 May 1854
An Act for better supplying with Gas the Town of Middleton and the Neighbourhood thereof in the County Palatine of Lancaster.
London Life Association Act 1854 (repealed)	17 & 18 Vict. c. ii	12 May 1854
An Act to enable the London Life Association to increase the Amount authorized by their Deed of Settlement to be assured upon a single Life in the said Society. (Repealed by London Life Association Act 1894 (57 & 58 Vict. c. xiv))
Radcliffe and Pilkington Gas Act 1854	17 & 18 Vict. c. iii	12 May 1854
An Act for granting further Powers to "The Radcliffe and Pilkington Gas Company."
Leeds New Gas Company's Act 1854 (repealed)	17 & 18 Vict. c. iv	12 May 1854
An Act to enable the Leeds New Gas Company to raise a further Sum of Money; to consolidate and amend the Acts relating to the Company; and for other Purposes. (Repealed by West Yorkshire Act 1980 (c. xiv))
Brighton, Hove and Preston Constant Service Waterworks Act 1854 (repealed)	17 & 18 Vict. c. v	12 May 1854
An Act for enabling the Brighton, Hove, and Preston Constant Service Waterworks Company to purchase the Undertaking of the Brighton, Hove, and Preston Waterworks Company; and for granting to the first-named Company all necessary Powers for supplying with Water the Parishes of Brighton, Hove, and Preston in the County of Sussex. (Repealed by Brighton Corporation Act 1931 (21 & 22 Geo. 5. c. cix))
Hastings and Saint Leonards Gas Act 1854	17 & 18 Vict. c. vi	12 May 1854
An Act for incorporating and extending the Powers of the Hastings and Saint Leonards Gas Company.
Norwich Equitable Fire Assurance Company Act 1854	17 & 18 Vict. c. vii	12 May 1854
An Act for enabling the Norwich Equitable Fire Assurance Company to sue and be sued in that Name, and for other Purposes.
Warrington Improvement and Market Act 1854	17 & 18 Vict. c. viii	12 May 1854
An Act for the Improvement of the Borough of Warrington; and for enabling the Council thereof to erect a covered Market; and for other Purposes.
Hatfield Chase Warping and Improvement Act 1854	17 & 18 Vict. c. ix	12 May 1854
An Act to warp and improve certain Lands in the Level of Hatfield Chase.
Nottingham Waterworks Amendment Act 1854 (repealed)	17 & 18 Vict. c. x	12 May 1854
An Act for enabling the Nottingham Waterworks Company, to raise a further Sum of Money; and for amending some of the Provisions of the Act relating to such Company. (Repealed by Statute Law (Repeals) Act 1995 (c. 44))
Royal Exchange Assurance Consolidation Act 1854 (repealed)	17 & 18 Vict. c. xi	12 May 1854
An Act to consolidate the Stock and Powers of the Corporation of "The Royal Exchange Assurance of Houses and Goods from Fire" with the Stock and Powers of the Corporation of "The Royal Exchange Assurance," and to confer on the last-named Corporation the Powers of "The Royal Exchange Assurance Annuity Company" and "The Royal Exchange Assurance Loan Company," and to give additional Powers to "The Royal Exchange Assurance." (Repealed by Royal Exchange Assurance Act 1901 (1 Edw. 7. c. x))
Amicable Assurance Society Amendment Act 1854 (repealed)	17 & 18 Vict. c. xii	12 May 1854
An Act to confer additional Powers upon the Corporation of the Amicable Society for a perpetual Assurance Office, for the Purposes of Investment. (Repealed by Amicable and Norwich Union Societies Act 1866 (29 & 30 Vict. c. cxxxv))
Kingston-upon-Hull Dock Amendment Act 1854	17 & 18 Vict. c. xiii	12 May 1854
An Act to enable the Dock Company at Kingston-upon-Hull to raise a further Sum of Money, and to convert the Mortgage and Bond Debt of the Company into Debenture Stock and Perpetual Annuities; and for other Purposes.
Liverpool Police Superannuation Fund Act 1854 (repealed)	17 & 18 Vict. c. xiv	12 May 1854
An Act for establishing a Police Superannuation Fund in the Borough of Liverpool. (Repealed by Liverpool Corporation Act 1921 (11 & 12 Geo. 5. c. lxxiv))
Liverpool Sanitary Amendment Act 1854 (repealed)	17 & 18 Vict. c. xv	12 May 1854
An Act to make further Provision for the Sewerage, Sanitary Regulation, and Improvement of the Borough of Liverpool. (Repealed by Liverpool Corporation Act 1921 (11 & 12 Geo. 5. c. lxxiv))
Southport Waterworks Act 1854	17 & 18 Vict. c. xvi	12 May 1854
An Act for better supplying with Water the Town of Southport in the County Palatine of Lancaster, and the Neighbourhood thereof.
Ramsbottom Gas Act 1854	17 & 18 Vict. c. xvii	12 May 1854
An Act for supplying with Gas Ramsbottom and other Places in the Parish of Bury in the County Palatine of Lancaster.
Rossendale Waterworks Amendment Act 1854 (repealed)	17 & 18 Vict. c. xviii	12 May 1854
An Act to enable the Rossendale Waterworks Company to raise a further Sum of Money. (Repealed by County of Lancashire Act 1984 (c. xxi))
Scarborough Public Market Act 1854	17 & 18 Vict. c. xix	12 May 1854
An Act for enabling the Scarborough Public Market Company to raise a further Sum of Money, and for amending and consolidating the Provisions of the Act (Note: Scarborough Public Market Act 1852 (15 & 16 Vict. c. vi)) relating to such Company.
Bolton Gas Company's Act 1854	17 & 18 Vict. c. xx	12 May 1854
An Act for lighting with Gas the Borough of Bolton and Places near thereto, and for other Purposes, and of which the Short Title is "The Bolton Gas Company's Act, 1854."
Kingswood District of Roads Act 1854 (repealed)	17 & 18 Vict. c. xxi	12 May 1854
An Act for continuing the Term and amending and extending the Provisions of the Act (Note: Wooton-under-edge and Wickwar Roads (Gloucestershire, Wiltshire) Act 1827 (7 & 8 Geo. 4. c. c)) relating to the Kingswood District of Turnpike Roads in the County of Gloucester. (Repealed by Statute Law (Repeals) Act 2013 (c. 2))
Stafford Gas Act 1854	17 & 18 Vict. c. xxii	12 May 1854
An Act for repealing "The Stafford Gas Act, 1846;" (Note: Stafford Gas Act 1846 (9 & 10 Vict. c. cxiv)) and for re-constituting the Stafford Gas Company, with additional Powers; and for other Purposes.
Burry Port Act 1854 (repealed)	17 & 18 Vict. c. xxiii	2 June 1854
An Act to enable "The Burry Port Company" to raise additional Capital, and to make Arrangements for the Satisfaction of the Mortgage and other Debts due from the Company; and to amend the Acts relating to the Company; and for other Purposes. (Repealed by Burry Port Harbour Revision Order 2000 (SI 2000/2152))
Whitehaven Junction Railway (Increase of Capital) Act 1854	17 & 18 Vict. c. xxiv	2 June 1854
An Act to enable the Whitehaven Junction Railway Company to raise a further Sum of Money, and to amend the Acts relating to the said Railway.
Port Gordon Harbour Act 1854	17 & 18 Vict. c. xxv	2 June 1854
An Act for improving and maintaining the Harbour or Port of Port Gordon in the County of Banff.
Rossendale Union Gas Company's Act 1854 (repealed)	17 & 18 Vict. c. xxvi	2 June 1854
An Act for lighting with Gas Bacup, Waterfoot, Newchurch, Rawtenstall, Crawshaw Booth, and other Places in the Forest of Rossendale in Lancashire. (Repealed by County of Lancashire Act 1984 (c. xxi))
Clitheroe Waterworks Act 1854	17 & 18 Vict. c. xxvii	2 June 1854
An Act for supplying with Water the Town and Municipal Borough of Clitheroe in the County of Lancaster.
Manchester Improvement Act 1854	17 & 18 Vict. c. xxviii	2 June 1854
An Act for enabling the Mayor, Aldermen, and Citizens of the City of Manchester to widen certain Streets in and otherwise improve the said City; to raise a further Sum of Money; and for other Purposes.
Madras Railway Company Act 1854 (repealed)	17 & 18 Vict. c. xxix	2 June 1854
An Act to amend an Act intituled "An Act for incorporating the Madras Railway Company, and for other Purposes connected therewith." (Note: Madras Railway Act 1853 (16 & 17 Vict. c. xlvi)) (Repealed by Statute Law (Repeals) Act 2013 (c. 2))
Harrow Waterworks Act 1854	17 & 18 Vict. c. xxx	2 June 1854
An Act for better supplying the Inhabitants of the Parish of Marrow in the County of Middlesex with Water.
Hereford Improvement Act 1854	17 & 18 Vict. c. xxxi	2 June 1854
An Act for the Improvement of the City of Hereford, and for other Purposes, and of which the Short Title is "The Hereford Improvement Act, 1854."
Ashton-under-Lyne and Dukinfield Corporations Act 1854	17 & 18 Vict. c. xxxii	2 June 1854
An Act for building a Bridge over the River Tame, to connect the Borough of Ashton-under-Lyne with the Township of Dukinfield.
Cardiff Gaslight Act 1854	17 & 18 Vict. c. xxxiii	2 June 1854
An Act for more effectually lighting with Gas the Town of Cardiff and certain Parishes adjacent thereto in the County of Glamorgan.
Newcastle-upon-Tyne Dock Act 1854	17 & 18 Vict. c. xxxiv	2 June 1854
An Act for making and maintaining Docks in the Borough and County of Newcastle-upon-Tyne.
Weymouth and Melcombe Regis Markets and Pier Act 1854	17 & 18 Vict. c. xxxv	2 June 1854
An Act to enable the Mayor, Aldermen, and Burgesses of the Borough of Weymouth and Melcombe Regis in the County of Dorset to provide Market Houses for the Sale of certain marketable Commodities, and to erect and maintain an improved Pier or Landing Place within the Borough, and for other Purposes.
Ridghill and Lanes and Holehouse Turnpike Road Act 1854	17 & 18 Vict. c. xxxvi	2 June 1854
An Act to repeal the Act (Note: Ridgehill and Lanes and Holehouse Road (Lancashire, Yorkshire) Act 1826 (7 Geo. 4. c. xxi)) relating to the Ridghill and Lanes and Holehouse Turnpike Road, and to make other Provisions in lieu thereof.
Birmingham Waterworks (Capital) Act 1854 (repealed)	17 & 18 Vict. c. xxxvii	2 June 1854
An Act to enable the Company of Proprietors of the Birmingham Waterworks to raise further Money. (Repealed by Birmingham Waterworks Act 1855 (18 & 19 Vict. c. xxxiv))
Manchester Corporation Waterworks Act 1854	17 & 18 Vict. c. xxxviii	2 June 1854
An Act for the Extension of the Manchester Corporation Waterworks, and for other Purposes, and of which the Short Title is "The Manchester Corporation Waterworks Act, 1854."
New River Company's (Hertfordshire Sewerage Diversion) Act 1854	17 & 18 Vict. c. xxxix	2 June 1854
An Act to enable the New River Company to construct certain Sewers, Drains, and other Works in and near the Town of Hertford; and for other Purposes.
Wellington (Salop) Improvement Act 1854	17 & 18 Vict. c. xl	2 June 1854
An Act for the Improvement of the Town of Wellington in the County of Salop.
West Hartlepool Improvement Act 1854 (repealed)	17 & 18 Vict. c. xli	2 June 1854
An Act for paving, lighting, watching, draining, cleansing, regulating, and otherwise improving the Town of West Hartlepool and Part of the Township of Stranton in the County of Durham; for providing a Cemetery; and for other Purposes. (Repealed by West Hartlepool Extension and Improvement Act 1870 (33 & 34 Vict. c. cxiii))
Brighton and Hove Gas Act 1854 (repealed)	17 & 18 Vict. c. xlii	2 June 1854
An Act to enable the Brighton and Hove General Gas Company to raise a further Sum of Money; and for other Purposes. (Repealed by Brighton and Hove Gas Act 1930 (20 & 21 Geo. 5. c. cxxviii))
National Assurance and Investment Association Act 1854	17 & 18 Vict. c. xliii	2 June 1854
An Act for granting certain Powers to "The National Assurance and Investment Association."
Great Indian Peninsula Railway Company Act 1854 (repealed)	17 & 18 Vict. c. xliv	2 June 1854
An Act to amend the Act (Note: Great Indian Peninsula Railway Company Act 1849 (12 & 13 Vict. c. lxxxiii)) incorporating the Great Indian Peninsula Railway Company, and for other Purposes connected therewith. (Repealed by Statute Law (Repeals) Act 2013 (c. 2))
Belfast Dock Act 1854	17 & 18 Vict. c. xlv	2 June 1854
An Act for making new Docks and other Works at Belfast, and for other Purposes, and of which the Short Title is "The Belfast Dock Act, 1854."
Rossall Sea Wall Act 1854	17 & 18 Vict. c. xlvi	2 June 1854
An Act for more effectually protecting certain Lands, forming Part of the Rossall Estate in the Township of Thornton in the Parish of Poulton le Fylde in the County of Lancaster from Inundation by the Sea.
South Shields Turnpike Roads Act 1854	17 & 18 Vict. c. xlvii	2 June 1854
An Act to renew the Term and continue certain of the Powers of an Act passed in the Seventh Year of the Reign of His Majesty King George the Fourth, intituled "An Act for making and maintaining a Turnpike Road from South Shields to White Mere Pool, and from thence to join the Durham and Newcastle Turnpike Road at Vigo Lane, with a Branch from Jarrow Slake to East Boldon, all in the County of Durham." (Note: South Shields and Vigo Lane Turnpike Road Act 1826 (7 Geo. 4. c. xvii))
Horsmonden and Marden Road Act 1854	17 & 18 Vict. c. xlviii	2 June 1854
An Act to renew the Term and continue the Powers of an Act passed in the Ninth Year of the Reign of His Majesty King George the Fourth, intituled "An Act for more effectually repairing and improving the Roads from Kippings Cross to Wilsley Green, and from a Place near Goudhurst Gore to Stilebridge, and from Underden Green to Wanshutts Green, all in the County of Kent." (Note: Roads from Kipping's Cross, Goudhurst Gore and Underden Green Act 1828 (9 Geo. 4. c. xvi))
Abergavenny Improvement Act 1854	17 & 18 Vict. c. xlix	2 June 1854
An Act for more effectually paving, lighting, and improving the Town of Abergavenny in the County of Monmouth, for maintaining the Markets within such Town, and for supplying the same with Water.
Buckingham and Towcester Road Act 1854	17 & 18 Vict. c. l	2 June 1854
An Act to create a further Term in the Buckingham and Towcester Road, and to amend and extend the Act (Note: Road from Buckingham to Towcester Act 1824 (5 Geo. 4. c. cxli)) relating thereto; and for other Purposes.
Louth Waterworks Act 1854	17 & 18 Vict. c. li	2 June 1854
An Act for better supplying with Water the Parish and Environs of Louth in the County of Lincoln.
Glasgow West End Improvement Act 1854	17 & 18 Vict. c. lii	2 June 1854
An Act for making a Street from Bothwell Street to Saint Vincent Street in the City of Glasgow.
South Staffordshire Railway Act 1854	17 & 18 Vict. c. liii	2 June 1854
An Act for enabling the South Staffordshire Railway Company to make Branch Railways to Cannock and Norton, to acquire additional Lands in the Parish of Wednesbury, and for other Purposes.
Guild of Literature and Art Act 1854 (repealed)	17 & 18 Vict. c. liv	2 June 1854
An Act to incorporate the Guild of Literature and Art, and to enable it to hold Land. (Repealed by Guild of Literature and Art (Dissolution) Act 1897 (60 & 61 Vict. c. xciii))
Imperial Gas Act 1854	17 & 18 Vict. c. lv	2 June 1854
An Act to consolidate and amend the Acts relating to the Imperial Gaslight and Coke Company, and to increase the Capital of the Company.
Saint Mawes Pier and Harbour Act 1854	17 & 18 Vict. c. lvi	2 June 1854
An Act for improving the Harbour, reconstructing the Pier, and defining the Limits of the Port and Harbour of Saint Mawes in the County of Cornwall
Newcastle and Carlisle Railway Act 1854	17 & 18 Vict. c. lvii	2 June 1854
An Act for authorizing the Newcastle-upon-Tyne and Carlisle Railway Company to raise further Monies for the Purposes of their Undertaking; and for other Purposes.
Lancashire and Yorkshire Railway (Liverpool Dock Branches) Act 1854	17 & 18 Vict. c. lviii	2 June 1854
An Act for enabling the Lancashire and Yorkshire Railway Company to construct a Railway from Kirkdale to the Liverpool Docks, with connecting Lines there; and for other Purposes.
Lancashire and Yorkshire Railway (Middleton Branch) Act 1854	17 & 18 Vict. c. lix	2 June 1854
An Act to enable the Lancashire and Yorkshire Railway Company to construct a Branch Railway to near Middleton in the County of Lancaster; and for other Purposes
Whittle Dean Waterworks Act 1854 (repealed)	17 & 18 Vict. c. lx	2 June 1854
An Act for enabling the Whittle Dean Water Company to extend their Works, and to obtain a further Supply of Water from certain Rivers and Streams in the County of Northumberland, in order to afford a better Supply of Water to the Inhabitants of Newcastle-upon-Tyne, Gateshead, and other Places in the Counties of Northumberland and Durham; and for consolidating and amending the Acts relating to such Company. (Repealed by Newcastle and Gateshead Waterworks Act 1863 (26 & 27 Vict. c. xxxiv))
London, Brighton and South Coast Railway Act 1854	17 & 18 Vict. c. lxi	2 June 1854
An Act to enable the London, Brighton, and South Coast Railway Company to enlarge their Stations at New Cross, the Bricklayers Arms, and Norwood; to widen the Branch Railway called "The Thames Junction Railway," and their Main Line of Railway in the Neighbourhood of such Branch; to increase their Capital, and to establish a Provident Institution for their Servants and Workmen; and for other Purposes.
Clyde Navigation Act 1854 (repealed)	17 & 18 Vict. c. lxii	16 June 1854
An Act to authorize the Parliamentary Trustees on the River Clyde and Harbour of Glasgow to raise a further Sum of Money, and to fund the Debt of the Trust; and for other Purposes. (Repealed by Clyde Navigation Consolidation Act 1858 (21 & 22 Vict. c. cxlix))
Islington Market Repeal Act 1854 (repealed)	17 & 18 Vict. c. lxiii	16 June 1854
An Act for repealing an Act passed in the Sixth Year of the Reign of His late Majesty King William the Fourth, (Note: St. Mary Islington Cattle Market Act 1835 (5 & 6 Will. 4. c. cxi)) for establishing a Market for the Sale of Cattle in the Parish of Saint Mary Islington in the County of Middlesex. (Repealed by Statute Law (Repeals) Act 2013 (c. 2))
Whitehaven, Cleator and Egremont Railway Act 1854	17 & 18 Vict. c. lxiv	16 June 1854
An Act for making a Railway from the Whitehaven and Furness Junction Railway near Whitehaven to Egremont in the County of Cumberland, with a Branch therefrom to Frizington in the same County, to be called the Whitehaven, Cleator, and Egremont Railway; and for other Purposes.
East London Waterworks Extension of Time Act 1854	17 & 18 Vict. c. lxv	16 June 1854
An Act for amending "The East London Waterworks Act, 1853." (Note: East London Waterworks Act 1853 (16 & 17 Vict. c. clxvi))
Padiham Waterworks Act 1854	17 & 18 Vict. c. lxvi	16 June 1854
An Act for better supplying with Water the Towa of Padiham and the Neighbourhood thereof, and the Villages of Habergham or Cheapside and Lower Houses or Thonhill Holme, all in the Parish of Whalley in the County of Lancaster.
Burnley Improvement Act 1854 (repealed)	17 & 18 Vict. c. lxvii	16 June 1854
An Act for the Improvement of the Town of Burnley and Parts of the Neighbourhood thereof, and for other Purposes, and of which the Short Title is "The Burnley Improvement Act, 1854." (Repealed by Burnley Borough Improvement Act 1871 (34 & 35 Vict. c. cliv))
Caterham Railway Act 1854	17 & 18 Vict. c. lxviii	16 June 1854
An Act for making a Railway from the London, Brighton, and South Coast Railway to Caterham in the County of Surrey.
Eastern Union Railway (Woodbridge) Act 1854	17 & 18 Vict. c. lxix	16 June 1854
An Act for granting further Powers to the Eastern Union Railway Company with respect to the Extension to Woodbridge.
Stockton, Middleton and Yarm Waterworks Act 1854 (repealed)	17 & 18 Vict. c. lxx	16 June 1854
An Act to enable the Stockton, Middlesbrough, and Yarm Water Company to supply with Water the Township of Norton in the County of Durham, and the Townships of Coatham and Redcar in the North Riding of the County of York, and other Places on the Line of the Mains and Pipes of the Company; and to enable the Company to raise a further Sum of Money; and to amend the Act (Note: Stockton, Middlesbrough, and Yarm Waterworks Act 1851 (14 & 15 Vict. c. xc)) relating to the Company; and for other Purposes. (Repealed by Stockton and Middlesbrough Waterworks Act 1858 (21 & 22 Vict. c. cxxxiii))
Petworth Turnpike Roads Act 1854 (repealed)	17 & 18 Vict. c. lxxi	16 June 1854
An Act to repeal certain Acts relating to the Petworth Turnpike Roads, and to make other Provisions in lieu thereof. (Repealed by Statute Law (Repeals) Act 2013 (c. 2))
New River Company's Act 1854	17 & 18 Vict. c. lxxii	16 June 1854
An Act to enable the New River Company to construct new Reservoirs and other Works in the County oi Middlesex.
Pontop and South Shields Wayleaves, &c. Purchase Act 1854	17 & 18 Vict. c. lxxiii	16 June 1854
An Act for enabling the York, Newcastle, and Berwick Railway Company to purchase all or any Estates, Rights, and Interests existing in the Lands or Grounds upon or adjoining to which the Railway of the said Company, called "The Pontop and South Shields Railway," has been formed, or otherwise to occupy such Lands or Grounds.
Hexham Turnpike Road Act 1854	17 & 18 Vict. c. lxxiv	3 July 1854
An Act for maintaining the Turnpike Road from Greenhead, through Haltwhistle, Hexham, and Corbridge, to the Military Road near Shildon Bar, and the Branch Road from Corbridge to Heddon-on-the-Wall, all in the County of Northumberland.
Trowbridge Roads Act 1854 (repealed)	17 & 18 Vict. c. lxxv	3 July 1854
An Act to create a further Term in the Trowbridge Roads, to add other Roads to the Trust, to amend and extend the Act relating to the said Roads, and for other Purposes. (Repealed by Annual Turnpike Acts Continuance Act 1876 (39 & 40 Vict. c. 39))
Furness Railway Act 1854 (repealed)	17 & 18 Vict. c. lxxvi	3 July 1854
An Act to enable the Furness Railway Company to raise a further Sum of Money; and for the Amendment of the Acts relating to the said Company. (Repealed by Furness Railway Act 1855 (18 & 19 Vict. c. clxxiii))
Shipley Waterworks and Police Act 1854	17 & 18 Vict. c. lxxvii	3 July 1854
An Act to make Provision with respect to Water Supply and Police for Shipley, Baildon, and Windhill in the West Riding of the County of York.
Kingston-upon-Thames Gas Act 1854	17 & 18 Vict. c. lxxviii	3 July 1854
An Act ta incorporate "The Kingston-upon-Thames Gas Company," and to enable them to light with Gas the Parishes of Kingston. Long Ditton, and Thames Ditton in the County of Surrey.
Blyth and Tyne Railway Consolidation and Extensions Act 1854	17 & 18 Vict. c. lxxix	3 July 1854
An Act for enabling the Blyth and Tyne Railway Company to construct Railways to Tynemouth and the Longhirst Station of the York, Newcastle, and Berwick Railway in the County of Northumberland; and for consolidating and amending the Acts relating to such Company.
North London Railway (Cattle Market Station) Act 1854	17 & 18 Vict. c. lxxx	3 July 1854
An Act to enable the North London Railway Company to construct a Station or Depot near to the New Metropolitan Cattle Market; to raise additional Capital; and for other Purposes.
Newport (Salop.) Marsh Improvement Act 1854 (repealed)	17 & 18 Vict. c. lxxxi	3 July 1854
An Act to repeal an Act (Note: Newport (Salop.) Inclosure Act 1764 (4 Geo. 3. c. 59)) for inclosing the Marsh in the Township of Newport in the County of Salop, and to vest the same and other Property in Trustees for paving, draining, cleansing, and otherwise improving the Town oi Newport; and for other Purposes. (Repealed by Newport (Salop.) Urban District Council Act 1929 (19 & 20 Geo. 5. c. lxxvii))
Nene Valley Drainage and Navigation Improvement (Amendment) Act 1854	17 & 18 Vict. c. lxxxii	3 July 1854
An Act to amend "The Nene Valley Drainage and Navigation Improvement Act, 1852," (Note: Nene Valley Drainage and Navigation Improvement Act 1852 (15 & 16 Vict. c. cxxviii)) and to provide additional Funds for carrying out certain of the Improvements authorized by such Act.
Ryde Improvement Act 1854	17 & 18 Vict. c. lxxxiii	3 July 1854
An Act for regulating and improving the Town of Ryde in the Isle of Wight, and providing a Supply of Gas and Water thereto, and for other Purposes.
Manchester Court of Record Procedure Act 1854 (repealed)	17 & 18 Vict. c. lxxxiv	3 July 1854
An Act to repeal an Act passed in the Ninth Year of the Reign of Her present Majesty, intituled "An Act for more effectually constituting and regulating the Court of Record within the Borough of Manchester and for extending the Jurisdiction of the said Court," (Note: Manchester Court of Record Act 1845 (8 & 9 Vict. c. cxlv)) and to extend the Powers and Jurisdiction of the said Court, and to simplify and otherwise improve its Practice and Proceedings; and for other Purposes. (Repealed by Salford Hundred Court of Record Act 1868 (31 & 32 Vict. c. cxxx))
Cornwall Railway (Share Arrangements) Act 1854 (repealed)	17 & 18 Vict. c. lxxxv	3 July 1854
An Act for enabling the Cornwall Railway Company to make certain Modifications in their Share Capital; and for other Purposes. (Repealed by Cornwall Railway Act 1861 (24 & 25 Vict. c. ccxv))
Chester, Farndon and Worthenbury Turnpike Road Act 1854	17 & 18 Vict. c. lxxxvi	3 July 1854
An Act for making a Turnpike Road from Chester by Farndon to Worthenbury, with a Branch therefrom to the Village of Farndon.
Accrington Gas and Waterworks Company's Act 1854	17 & 18 Vict. c. lxxxvii	3 July 1854
An Act to consolidate and extend the Powers of the Accrington Gas and Waterworks Company, and to enable them the better to supply with Gas and Water the Townships and Places of Old Accrington, New Accrington, Church, Lower Booths, and Huncoat, in the Parish of Whalley, and the Extra-parochial Place of Henheads, all in the County of Lancaster, and to sell or lease their Undertaking to the Local Board of Health for the District of Accrington; and for other Purposes.
Doncaster Cemetery Act 1854 (repealed)	17 & 18 Vict. c. lxxxviii	3 July 1854
An Act to establish a General Cemetery for the Borough of Doncaster, and for other Purposes. (Repealed by Doncaster Corporation Act 1915 (5 & 6 Geo. 5. c. xv))
Havering, Dagenham, &c., Sewers Act 1854 (repealed)	17 & 18 Vict. c. lxxxix	3 July 1854
An Act to extend the Powers of the Commissioners of Sewers f6r the Levels of Havering, Dagenham, and other Places, and to enable them to construct Sewers in the Parishes of West Ham, East Ham, and North Woolwich. (Repealed by West Ham Corporation (Improvements) Act 1888 (51 & 52 Vict. c. clxxix))
Hamilton Waterworks Act 1854	17 & 18 Vict. c. xc	3 July 1854
An Act for the better supplying with Water the Parliamentary Burgh or Town of Hamilton and Suburbs thereof.
Birmingham and Midland Institute Act 1854	17 & 18 Vict. c. xci	3 July 1854
An Act to incorporate the Birmingham and Midland Institute, to define its Constitution, and to enable the Council of the Borough of Birmingham to grant a Site for the Institute Buildings.
Blyth Harbour and Dock Act 1854 (repealed)	17 & 18 Vict. c. xcii	3 July 1854
An Act for improving the Harbour of Blyth in the County of Northumberland, and for constructing Docks there; and for other Purposes. (Repealed by Blyth Harbour and Dock Act 1858 (21 & 22 Vict. c. lxviii))
Crystal Palace Company's Act 1854 (repealed)	17 & 18 Vict. c. xciii	3 July 1854
An Act to enable the Crystal Palace Company to divert certain Roads, and to take and let Land on Lease; and for other Purposes. (Repealed by London County Council (Crystal Palace) Act 1951 (14 & 15 Geo. 6. c. xxviii))
Surrey Consumers Gas Company's Act 1854	17 & 18 Vict. c. xciv	3 July 1854
An Act to incorporate "The Surrey Consumers Gaslight and Coke Association," and to enable them to raise further Sums of Money; and for other Purposes.
Stroud, Painswick and Gloucester Road Act 1854 (repealed)	17 & 18 Vict. c. xcv	3 July 1854
An Act to repeal the Acts relating to the Turnpike Road from Gloucester through Painswick to Stroud, and make other Provisions in lieu thereof. (Repealed by Statute Law (Repeals) Act 2013 (c. 2))
Cork and Bandon Railway (Skibbereen Branch) Act 1854	17 & 18 Vict. c. xcvi	3 July 1854
An Act to enable the Cork and Bandon Railway Company to make a Branch Railway to Skibbereen, and to raise further Capital for the Cork and Bandon Railway; and for other Purposes.
New Mill District Turnpike Road Act 1854	17 & 18 Vict. c. xcvii	3 July 1854
An Act to amend an Act passed in the Fourth Year of the Reign of His late Majesty King George the Fourth, intituled "An Act for more effectually repairing the Wadsley and Langset Turnpike Road, and extending the same in Two Lines to join the Huddersfield and Woodhead Turnpike Road in the Townships of Upperthong and Honley in the West Riding of the County of York," (Note: Wadsley and Langset Turnpike Road Extension Act 1823 (4 Geo. 4. c. lxxvii)) and to continue the Term thereby granted, so far as the said Act and the Term thereby granted relate to the New Mill District of Road therein mentioned.
Londonderry Bridge Act 1854 (repealed)	17 & 18 Vict. c. xcviii	3 July 1854
An Act to alter the Site of the new Bridge authorized to be erected over the River Foyle at Londonderry, and to make Approaches thereto. (Repealed by Londonderry Bridge Act 1859 (22 Vict. c. vii))
Beccles Water and Gas Act 1854	17 & 18 Vict. c. xcix	3 July 1854
An Act for providing Waterworks, Gasworks, and public Baths and Wash-houses for the Town and Borough of Beccles in the County of Suffolk.
Hull General Cemetery Company Act 1854	17 & 18 Vict. c. c	3 July 1854
An Act to incorporate the Hull General Cemetery Company, and to enlarge and improve their cemetery, and for other purposes.
Kingston-upon-Hull Improvement Act 1854	17 & 18 Vict. c. ci	3 July 1854
An Act for the further Improvement of Kingston-upon-Hull, and for other Purposes.
Llandudno Improvement Act 1854	17 & 18 Vict. c. cii	3 July 1854
An Act for paving, lighting, watching, draining, supplying with Water, watering, cleansing, regulating, and otherwise improving the Town of Llandudno in the County of Carnarvon, for making a Cemetery, and for establishing and regulating a Market and Market Places therein; and for other Purposes.
Bideford Roads Act 1854	17 & 18 Vict. c. ciii	3 July 1854
An Act for more effectually repairing several Roads adjoining or near to the Town of Bideford, and for making several Lines of Road connected with the same, all in the County of Devon.
Lanark Police and Improvement Act 1854	17 & 18 Vict. c. civ	3 July 1854
An Act for regulating the Police of the Royal Burgh o£ Lanark, and for paving, draining, cleansing, lighting, watching, and improving the same, for regulating the Markets thereof; and for other Purposes.
Dudley, Halesowen and Bromsgrove Road Act 1854	17 & 18 Vict. c. cv	3 July 1854
An Act for more effectually repairing the Roads in the Counties of Worcester and Stafford known as the Dudley, Halesowen, and Bromsgrove District of Roads.
Tacumshin Embankment Act 1854	17 & 18 Vict. c. cvi	3 July 1854
An Act to embank and reclaim from the Sea certain Waste Lands subject to be overflowed by the Tide, called Tacumshin Lake, in the County of Wexford.
Exhibition of 1851 Roads and Lands Act 1854	17 & 18 Vict. c. cvii	3 July 1854
An Act to authorize the making certain Roads and stopping up certain Lanes and Footways between Kensington Gore and Brompton in the County of Middlesex, and for otherwise facilitating the Formation of a Site for Institutions connected with Science and the Arts.
Great Western Railway (Station Accommodation, &c.) Act 1854	17 & 18 Vict. c. cviii	3 July 1854
An Act for enabling the Great Western Railway Company to provide additional Station Accommodation at Birmingham, Wolverhampton, and Bushbury; and for other Purposes.
Stamford and Kettering, and Oundle and Middleton Lane Turnpike Roads Act 1854	17 & 18 Vict. c. cix	3 July 1854
An Act to repeal an Act for enlarging the Term and Powers of an Act of His late Majesty George the Third, (Note: Stamford and Kettering, and Oundle and Middleton Roads Act 1816 (56 Geo. 3. c. ii)) for repairing the Road from Saint Martin Stamford Baron to Kettering, and from Oundle to Middleton Lane in the County of Northampton, and to make other Provisions in lieu thereof.
Bangor Water and Gas Act 1854	17 & 18 Vict. c. cx	3 July 1854
An Act for supplying with Water the Parishes of Bangor, Llandegai, and Llanllechid, and with Gas the Pariah of Bangor.
Bethesda Improvement Act 1854	17 & 18 Vict. c. cxi	3 July 1854
An Act for the Improvement of the Town of Bethesda and Neighbourhood in the County of Carnarvon.
Birmingham Canal Navigations Act 1854	17 & 18 Vict. c. cxii	3 July 1854
An Act for enabling the Company of Proprietors of the Birmingham Canal Navigations to make new Canals and other Works; and for other Purposes.
Birmingham Parks Act 1854 (repealed)	17 & 18 Vict. c. cxiii	3 July 1854
An Act for establishing Parks in or near to the Borough of Birmingham. (Repealed by Birmingham Corporation (Consolidation) Act 1883 (46 & 47 Vict. c. lxx))
Chesterfield Market Act 1854 (repealed)	17 & 18 Vict. c. cxiv	3 July 1854
An Act for constructing a Market House and other Buildings for Public Accommodation at Chesterfield in the County of Derby, and for the better Regulation and Maintenance of the Market there. (Repealed by Chesterfield Corporation Act 1923 (13 & 14 Geo. 5. c. xcix))
Darlington and Barnard Castle Railway Act 1854 (repealed)	17 & 18 Vict. c. cxv	3 July 1854
An Act for making a Railway from the Stockton and Darlington Railway near Darlington to or near to Barnard Castle, both in the County of Durham, and for making Arrangements with the Stockton and Darlington Railway Company; and for other Purposes. (Repealed by Stockton and Darlington Railway Amalgamation Act 1858 (21 & 22 Vict. c. cxvi))
Dowlais Railway Act 1854 (repealed)	17 & 18 Vict. c. cxvi	3 July 1854
An Act for making a Railway from the Dowlais Railway to the Vale of Neath Railway at Merthyr Tydfil, and for other Purposes, and of which the Short Title is "The Dowlais Railway Act, 1854." (Repealed by Merthyr Tydfil Corporation Act 1948 (11 & 12 Geo. 6. c. xlii))
East Lancashire and Lancashire and Yorkshire Railways Act 1854	17 & 18 Vict. c. cxvii	3 July 1854
An Act for Vesting in the East Lancashire Railway Company jointly with the Lancashire and Yorkshire Railway Company certain Parts of the Manchester and Southport Railway and of the Lancashire and Yorkshire Railway; and for other Purposes.
Edinburgh Police Amendment Act 1854 (repealed)	17 & 18 Vict. c. cxviii	3 July 1854
An Act to amend "The Edinburgh Police Act, 1848," (Note: Edinburgh Police Act 1848 (11 & 12 Vict. c. cxiii)) and to make further Provision for Sewerage, Drainage, and Improvement of the City of Edinburgh, for deepening and cleansing the Water of Leith, and for other Purposes. (Repealed by Edinburgh Municipal and Police Act 1879 (42 & 43 Vict. c. cxxxii))
East Suffolk Railway Act 1854	17 & 18 Vict. c. cxix	3 July 1854
An Act for making a Railway in Deviation and Extension of the Halesworth, Beccles, and Haddiscoe Railway from Westhall Low Common to Woodbridge, and certain Branches therefrom, and for changing the Name of the Company to the East Suffolk Railway Company.
Shrewsbury and Chester Railway Act 1854	17 & 18 Vict. c. cxx	3 July 1854
An Act to amend the Provisions of certain Acts relating to the Shrewsbury and Chester Railway Company, and for other Purposes.
South Sea Company's Winding Up Act 1854	17 & 18 Vict. c. cxxi	3 July 1854
An Act to enable the South Sea Company to realize and divide their Capital Stock and Assets.
South Devon Railway (Sutton Harbour Branch) Act 1854	17 & 18 Vict. c. cxxii	3 July 1854
An Act for enabling the South Devon Railway Company to improve their Sutton Harbour Branch, and for other Purposes, and of which the Short Title is "The South Devon Railway (Sutton Harbour Branch) Act, 1854."
Winchester and Petersfield Turnpike Road Act 1854 (repealed)	17 & 18 Vict. c. cxxiii	3 July 1854
An Act to continue the Term and to amend and extend the Provisions of the Act (Note: Winchester and Petersfield Turnpike Road Act 1825 (6 Geo. 4. c. xiv)) relating to the Winchester and Petersfield Turnpike Road; and for other Purposes. (Repealed by Annual Turnpike Acts Continuance Act 1872 (35 & 36 Vict. c. 85))
Bradford Waterworks Act 1854	17 & 18 Vict. c. cxxiv	3 July 1854
An Act to make further Provision for supplying with Water the Borough of Bradford and certain Places in the Neighbourhood thereof.
Borough of Yeovil Extension and Improvement Act 1854 or the Borough of Yeovil Extension Act 1854	17 & 18 Vict. c. cxxv	3 July 1854
An Act for the Regulation of the Municipal Corporation of the Borough of Yeovil in the County of Somerset, and for the Extension of the Boundaries of the said Borough, and for the Improvement of the said Borough.
Swansea Harbour Act 1854	17 & 18 Vict. c. cxxvi	3 July 1854
An Act for the Conservancy and Improvement of Swansea Harbour, and for other Purposes, and of which the Short Title is "The Swansea Harbour Act, 1854."
Hertford and Welwyn Junction Railway Act 1854	17 & 18 Vict. c. cxxvii	3 July 1854
An Act for making a Railway from the Great Northern Railway at or near Welwyn in the County of Hertford to Hertford in the same County, to be called the "Hertford and Welwyn Junction Railway;" and for other Purposes.
Stockton and Darlington Railway Act 1854	17 & 18 Vict. c. cxxviii	3 July 1854
An Act for authorizing the Stockton and Darlington Railway Company to make new Works, and for other Purposes, and of which the Short Title is "The Stockton and Darlington Railway Act, 1854."
Bradford Corporation Waterworks Act 1854 (repealed)	17 & 18 Vict. c. cxxix	3 July 1854
An Act for better supplying with Water the Borough of Bradford in the County of York. (Repealed by West Yorkshire Act 1980 (c. xiv))
Norfolk Railway (Lowestoft Harbour Improvement) Act 1854 (repealed)	17 & 18 Vict. c. cxxx	3 July 1854
An Act to authorise certain Improvements in or in connexion with the Lowestoft Harbour, and for other Purposes. (Repealed by Great Eastern Railway Act 1862 (25 & 26 Vict. c. ccxxiii))
Glasgow New Suspension Bridge Act 1854 (repealed)	17 & 18 Vict. c. cxxxi	3 July 1854
An Act for constructing a Bridge for Foot Passengers across the River Clyde opposite to the North End of Mac Neil Street in the City of Glasgow. (Repealed by Glasgow Bridges Consolidation Act 1866 (29 & 30 Vict. c. cccxxvii))
Mallow and Fermoy Railway Act 1854	17 & 18 Vict. c. cxxxii	3 July 1854
An Act for making a Railway from the Great Southern and Western Railway near Mallow to Fermoy, to be called "The Mallow and Fermoy Railway;" and for other Purposes.
London, Tilbury and Southend Railway Deviation and Amendment Act 1854	17 & 18 Vict. c. cxxxiii	3 July 1854
An Act to alter the Line of the London, Tilbury, and Southend Extension Railway, to authorize the Lease thereof, and the Purchase of the Railway and certain Parts of the Works belonging to the Thames Haven Dock and Railway Company; and for other Purposes.
Edinburgh Roads Act 1854	17 & 18 Vict. c. cxxxiv	3 July 1854
An Act for Removal of Toll Bars beyond the Parliamentary Boundaries of the City of Edinburgh, and for other Purposes.
Londonderry and Enniskillen Railway Act 1854	17 & 18 Vict. c. cxxxv	3 July 1854
An Act to enable the Londonderry and Enniskillen Railway Company to make a Branch Railway to Fintona, and to extend their Line at Londonderry; and for other Purposes.
Bagenalstown and Wexford Railway Act 1854	17 & 18 Vict. c. cxxxvi	3 July 1854
An Act for making a Railway from the Irish South-eastern Railway at Bagenalstown to Wexford, to be called "The Bagenalstown and Wexford Railway."
Brighton, Cuckfield and West Grinstead Turnpike Roads Act 1854	17 & 18 Vict. c. cxxxvii	3 July 1854
An Act for continuing the Term and amending and extending the Provisions of the Act (Note: Roads from Brighton and from Austy Cross Act 1825 (6 Geo. 4. c. xxxix)) relating to the Brighton, Cuckfield, and Lovell Heath, and Cuckfield and West Grinsted Turnpike Roads.
Ambergate Railway (Nottingham Extension and Station) Act 1854	17 & 18 Vict. c. cxxxviii	3 July 1854
An Act to authorise the Extension by the Ambergate, Nottingham, and Boston and Eastern Junction Railway Company of their Line of Railway into the Town of Nottingham, the Formation of a Station there; and for other Purposes.
Law Life Assurance Society Act 1854 (repealed)	17 & 18 Vict. c. cxxxix	3 July 1854
An Act to give further Powers to the Law Life Assurance Society with respect to the Investment of the Funds of the Society. (Repealed by Law Life Assurance Society's Act 1863 (26 & 27 Vict. c. clxi))
Rochdale and Burnley Road Tolls Act 1854	17 & 18 Vict. c. cxl	10 July 1854
An Act to authorize the Trustees of the Rochdale and Burnley Turnpike Roads to take Toll in respect of the Carriages of certain Stones.
North and South Western Junction Railway Act 1854	17 & 18 Vict. c. cxli	10 July 1854
An Act for enabling the North and South Western Junction Railway Company to raise additional Capital; and for other Purposes.
Tralee and Killarney Railway Act 1854	17 & 18 Vict. c. cxlii	10 July 1854
An Act to amend the Tralee and Killarney Railway Act, 1853. (Note: Tralee and Killarney Railway Act 1853 (16 & 17 Vict. c. clxxxix))
Horncastle Railway Act 1854	17 & 18 Vict. c. cxliii	10 July 1854
An Act for making a Railway from Horncastle in Lincolnshire to the Kirkstead Station of the Great Northern Railway.
Leominster and Kington Railway Act 1854	17 & 18 Vict. c. cxliv	10 July 1854
An Act for making a Railway from the Shrewsbury and Hereford Railway at Leominster to Kington in Herefordshire.
Kirkby Lonsdale, Kendal and Milnthorpe Turnpike Road Act 1854	17 & 18 Vict. c. cxlv	10 July 1854
An Act for more effectually repairing the Road from the Toll House Beck in the Township of Ireby in the County of Lancaster to Kirkby Lonsdale and Kirkby Kendal in the County of Westmordand, and through Kirkby Lonsdale to Milnthorpe in the said County.
Ayr and Maybole Junction Railway Act 1854	17 & 18 Vict. c. cxlvi	10 July 1854
An Act for making a Railway from the Ayr and Dalmellington Railway near the Cothouses on the Farm of Pleasantfield to the Town of Maybole, to be called "The Ayr and Maybole Junction Railway."
Stourbridge Waterworks Act 1854 (repealed)	17 & 18 Vict. c. cxlvii	10 July 1854
An Act for supplying the Township of Stourbridge and the Neighbourhood thereof with Water. (Repealed by Stourbridge and District Water Board Act 1909 (9 Edw. 7. c. xci))
Perth and Dunkeld Railway Act 1854	17 & 18 Vict. c. cxlviii	10 July 1854
An Act for making a Railway from the Scottish Midland Junction Railway near Stanley to Birnam near Dunkeld in the County of Perth.
Shrewsbury and Hereford Railway (Stations) Act 1854	17 & 18 Vict. c. cxlix	10 July 1854
An Act to authorize the Shrewsbury and Hereford Railway Company to provide Station Accommodation in Shrewsbury and Hereford, and to enter into Arrangements and Agreements with the Hereford, Ross, and Gloucester Railway Company.
Vale of Towy Railway Act 1854	17 & 18 Vict. c. cl	10 July 1854
An Act for making a Railway from the Town of Llandovery in the County of Carmarthen to join the Llanelly Railway at Llandilofawr in the same County, and for other Purposes.
North Yorkshire and Cleveland Railway Act 1854	17 & 18 Vict. c. cli	10 July 1854
An Act to incorporate a Company for making a Railway from near the Picton Station on the Leeds Northern Railway to near the Grosmont Station on the Whitby and Pickering Branch of the York and North Midland Railway, and for other Purposes.
Thirsk and Yarm Turnpike Road Act 1854	17 & 18 Vict. c. clii	10 July 1854
An Act to repeal the Act (Note: Thirsk and Yarm Road Act 1824 (5 Geo. 4. c. vi)) relating to the Thirsk and Yarm Turnpike Road, and to make other Provisions in lieu thereof, and to grant a further Term in the said Road; and for other Purposes.
Eastern Counties Railway (London Goods Station) Act 1854 (repealed)	17 & 18 Vict. c. cliii	10 July 1854
An Act to enable the Eastern Counties Railway Company to enlarge and improve their Goods Station in the Parish of Saint Matthew Bethnal Green in the County of Middlesex. (Repealed by Great Eastern Railway Act 1862 (25 & 26 Vict. c. ccxxiii))
Camden Town Cemetery Act 1854	17 & 18 Vict. c. cliv	10 July 1854
An Act to enable the granting Building Leases of Parts of the Camden Town Cemetery belonging to the Parish of Saint Martin in the Fields not heretofore used for the Purpose of Interment, and for other Purposes.
Caledonian Railway (Branches and Amendment) Act 1854	17 & 18 Vict. c. clv	10 July 1854
An Act to enable the Caledonian Railway Company to make certain Branch Railways and other Works in the County of Lanark; and for other Purposes.
Caledonian Railway (Lesmahagow Branches) Act 1854	17 & 18 Vict. c. clvi	10 July 1854
An Act for altering the Lines authorized by the Caledonian Railway (Lesmahagow Branches) Act, 1851, (Note: Caledonian Railways (Lesmahagow Branches) Act 1851 (14 & 15 Vict. c. xcix)) and for otherwise amending that Act.
Dukinfield Gas Act 1854	17 & 18 Vict. c. clvii	10 July 1854
An Act to confer further Powers on the Dukinfield Gas Company.
South Wales Railway Act 1854	17 & 18 Vict. c. clviii	10 July 1854
An Act for enabling the South Wales Railway Company to acquire additional Land at Swansea, and for enlarging the Powers of Lease or Sale to and Contribution by the Great Western Railway Company, and for authorizing Arrangements between the South Wales Railway Company and the Vale of Neath Railway Company, and for other Purposes.
Bolton Improvement Act 1854	17 & 18 Vict. c. clix	10 July 1854
An Act for the Improvement of the Borough of Bolton, and for other Purposes, and of which the Short Title is "Bolton Improvement Act, 1854."
Bradford, Wakefield and Leeds Railway Act 1854	17 & 18 Vict. c. clx	10 July 1854
An Act for making a Railway from the Leeds, Bradford, and Halifax Junction Railway near Leeds to Wakefield, all in the West Riding of the County of York, to be called "The Bradford, Wahcfield, and Leeds Railway;" and for other Purposes.
Lowestoft Improvement Act 1854	17 & 18 Vict. c. clxi	10 July 1854
An Act for the Improvement and Regulation of the Town of Lowestoft, and the Parishes of Lowestoft and Kirkley otherwise Kirtley, in the County of Suffolk, and for other Purposes.
Leeds, Bradford and Halifax Junction Railway Act 1854	17 & 18 Vict. c. clxii	10 July 1854
An Act to enable the Leeds, Bradford, and Halifax Junction Railway Company to construct a Railway in extension of and to alter the Levels of Part of their Railway from Gildersome Street to East Ardsley in the West Riding of the County of York; and for other Purposes.
West Bromwich Improvement Act 1854 (repealed)	17 & 18 Vict. c. clxiii	10 July 1854
An Act for the better paving, draining, lighting, cleansing, and otherwise improving the Parish of West Bromwich in the County of Stafford, and for constructing Cemeteries there, and for makings maintaining, and regulating Markets and Market Places therein; and for other Purposes. (Repealed by West Bromwich Corporation Act 1969 (c. lix))
Jarrow Dock and Railway Act 1854	17 & 18 Vict. c. clxiv	10 July 1854
An Act to confer additional Powers on the York, Newcastle, and Berwick Railway Company for constructing Docks at Jarrow Slake, and a Branch Railway thereto; and to enable the Dean and Chapter of Durham to appropriate a Portion of the Money payable to them for the Purchase of Lands for the same to the Endowment of a Church; and for other Purposes.
Chapel-en-le-Frith Turnpike Roads Act 1854	17 & 18 Vict. c. clxv	10 July 1854
An Act to repeal the Act (Note: Road from Chapel-en-le-Frith to Enterclough Bridge Act 1827 (7 & 8 Geo. 4. c. xxv)) for more effectually repairing and maintaining the Turnpike Road from Chapel-en-le-Frith to or near to Enterclough Bridge in the County of Derby, and other Roads therein mentioned, in the County of Derby and in the County Palatine of Chester; and to make other Provisions in lieu thereof.
Patent Solid Sewage Manure Company's Act 1854	17 & 18 Vict. c. clxvi	10 July 1854
An Act to re-incorporate the Patent Solid Sewage Manure Company, and to extend its Powers.
Farnworth and Kearsley Gas Act 1854	17 & 18 Vict. c. clxvii	10 July 1854
An Act for supplying with Gas the Townships of Farnworth and Kearsley in the County Palatine of Lancaster.
Bangor and Caernarvon Railway (Transfer) Act 1854	17 & 18 Vict. c. clxviii	10 July 1854
An Act to enable the Bangor and Caernarvon Railway Company to raise additional Capital, and to authorize the Sale or Lease of the said Company's Railway to the Chester and Holyhead Railway Company.
Middlesex Industrial Schools Act 1854 (repealed)	17 & 18 Vict. c. clxix	24 July 1854
An Act for the Provision, Regulation, and Maintenance of County Industrial Schools in Middlesex. (Repealed by Children Act 1908 (8 Edw. 7. c. 67))
Bannow Embankment Act 1854	17 & 18 Vict. c. clxx	24 July 1854
An Act for the Embankment, Reclamation, and Drainage of Lands in the Bay of Bannow in the County of Wexford.
Ambergate Railway (Reduction of Capital) Act 1854	17 & 18 Vict. c. clxxi	24 July 1854
An Act to amend the Acts relating to the Ambergate, Nottingham, and Boston and Eastern Junction Railway Company, and to authorize the Reduction and Regulation of and certain Arrangements as to the Capital of the said Company; and for other Purposes.
Hilgay Great West Fen Drainage Act 1854	17 & 18 Vict. c. clxxii	24 July 1854
An Act for more effectually draining certain Fen Lands and Wet Grounds called "The Great West Fen," in the Parish of Hilgay in the County of Norfolk.
Stourbridge and Bridgnorth Road Act 1854	17 & 18 Vict. c. clxxiii	24 July 1854
An Act for more effectually repairing the Road from Stourbridge in the County of Worcester to Bridgnorth in the County of Salop.
Shrewsbury and Hereford Railway (Leasing) Act 1854	17 & 18 Vict. c. clxxiv	24 July 1854
An Act to enable the Shrewsbury and Hereford Railway Company to lease their Undertaking.
Dublin and Wicklow and Dublin and Kingstown Railway Act 1854	17 & 18 Vict. c. clxxv	24 July 1854
An Act to enable the Dublin and Wicklow and the Dublin and Kingstown Railway Companies to alter certain existing Contracts therein mentioned; and for other Purposes.
Inverness and Nairn Railway Act 1854 (repealed)	17 & 18 Vict. c. clxxvi	24 July 1854
An Act for making a Railway from the Town of Inverness to the Town of Nairn. (Repealed by Inverness and Nairn Railway Act 1857 (20 & 21 Vict. c. v))
Londonderry Port and Harbour Act 1854	17 & 18 Vict. c. clxxvii	24 July 1854
An Act to consolidate the several Acts relating to the Port and Harbour of Londonderry; for the Improvement of the Navigation of the Lough and River of Lough Foyle; and to authorize the Construction of a uniform Line of Quays, Docks, and other Works.
Wapentake of Ouse and Derwent Drainage Act 1854	17 & 18 Vict. c. clxxviii	24 July 1854
An Act for the more effectual Drainage and Improvement of certain Lands in the Wapentake of Ouse and Derwent in the East Riding of the County of York, and for other Purposes.
Shropshire Union Railways and Canal Act 1854	17 & 18 Vict. c. clxxix	24 July 1854
An Act to reduce the Capital and define the Undertaking of the Shropshire Union Railways and Canal Company.
Wells and Fakenham Railway Act 1854	17 & 18 Vict. c. clxxx	24 July 1854
An Act for making a Railway from the Town of Wells to join the Norfolk Railway at Fakenham, to be called "The Wells and Fakenham Railway."
Darlington Local Board Act 1854	17 & 18 Vict. c. clxxxi	24 July 1854
An Act to enable the Local Board of Health for the Township of Darlington to supply Gas and Water within their District, and to purchase the Works of the Darlington Gas and Water Company; to establish and regulate Markets and Slaughter-houses, and a Public Park; to construct Sewage Works, and raise Money; and for other Purposes.
Ardrossan Railway Transfer Act 1854	17 & 18 Vict. c. clxxxii	24 July 1854
An Act for vesting the Ardrossan Railway in the Glasgow and South-western Railway Company, and for other Purposes.
Blackburn Improvement Act 1854 (repealed)	17 & 18 Vict. c. clxxxiii	24 July 1854
An Act for transferring to the Mayor, Aldermen, and Burgesses of the Borough of Blackburn all the Powers and Property now vested in "The Blackburn Improvement Commissioners," and certain Powers and Property by the Private Act of the Fourth and Fifth Years of the Reign of Her present Majesty, Chapter Forty-six, (Note: Blackburn Town's Moor Act 1841 (4 & 5 Vict. c. 46 Pr.)) vested in the Overseers of the Poor of the Township of Blackburn, authorizing the Corporation to purchase the Property of the Blackburn Waterworks Company, and conferring on them further Powers for the Improvement and Regulation of the Borough; and for other Purposes. (Repealed by County of Lancashire Act 1984 (c. xxi))
Caledonian Railway (General Terminus Purchase) Act 1854	17 & 18 Vict. c. clxxxiv	24 July 1854
An Act for vesting in the Caledonian Railway Company certain Portions of the Undertaking of the General Terminus and Glasgow Harbour Railway Company.
Newport (Monmouthshire) Docks Act 1854 or the Newport Dock Company Act 1854	17 & 18 Vict. c. clxxxv	24 July 1854
An Act to enable the Newport Dock Company to construct a new Dock and other Works; and for other Purposes.
Portsmouth Railway Amendment Act 1854	17 & 18 Vict. c. clxxxvi	24 July 1854
An Act to enable the Portsmouth Railway Company to make certain Alterations in the Line and Levels of their Railway, and to extend their said Line from Godalming to Shalford; and for other Purposes.
Great North of Scotland Railway Amendment Act 1854 (repealed)	17 & 18 Vict. c. clxxxvii	24 July 1854
An Act to authorize the Great North of Scotland Railway Company to divert their Railway, to make a short Branch to the Victoria Docks at Aberdeen, to enter into Arrangements with the Aberdeen Harbour Commissioners and the Aberdeen Railway Company with respect to a Tramway to connect the Two Railways; and for other Purposes. (Repealed by Great North of Scotland Railway Consolidation Act 1859 (22 & 23 Vict. c. viii))
Methwold Drainage Act 1854 (repealed)	17 & 18 Vict. c. clxxxviii	24 July 1854
An Act for the more effectual Drainage and Improvement of certain Lands in the Parish of Methwold in the County of Norfolk, and for other Purposes. (Repealed by Methwold and Feltwell Drainage Act 1909 (9 Edw. 7. c. lxxix))
South Devon and Tavistock Railway Act 1854	17 & 18 Vict. c. clxxxix	24 July 1854
An Act for making a Railway from the South Devon Railway near Plymouth to Tavistock, with a Branch, to be called "The South Devon and Tavistock Railway," and for other Purposes.
Royal Conical Flour Mill Company's Act 1854	17 & 18 Vict. c. cxc	24 July 1854
An Act for incorporating and regulating a Company to be called "Royal Conical Flour Mill Company," and to enable the said Company to purchase, work, and use certain Letters Patent; and for other Purposes.
Newport and Pillgwenlly Waterworks Act 1854	17 & 18 Vict. c. cxci	24 July 1854
An Act to enable the Newport and Pillgwenlly Waterworks Company to increase and extend their Supply of Water, and to construct new Works; and for other Purposes.
Birkenhead Dock Trustees Act 1854 (repealed)	17 & 18 Vict. c. cxcii	24 July 1854
An Act for authorizing Arrangements with respect to the South Reserve at Birkenhead, and for other Purposes, and of which the Short Title is "The Birkenhead Dock Trustees Act, 1854." (Repealed by Mersey Dock Acts Consolidation Act 1858 (21 & 22 Vict. c. xcii))
Rhymney Railway Act 1854 (repealed)	17 & 18 Vict. c. cxciii	24 July 1854
An Act for making a Railway from Rhymney to a Point of Junction with the Newport, Abergavenny, and Hereford Railway near Bedllewyn, with a Branch up the Bargoed Rumney Valley, to be called "The Rhymney Railway;" and for other Purposes. (Repealed by Rhymney Railway Act 1857 (20 & 21 Vict. c. cxl))
North Staffordshire Railway Branches Act 1854	17 & 18 Vict. c. cxciv	24 July 1854
An Act to enable the North Staffordshire Railway Company to make a Railway from Stoke-upon-Trent to Congleton, with Branches therefrom.
Tees Conservancy Act 1854 (repealed)	17 & 18 Vict. c. cxcv	24 July 1854
An Act to repeal, alter, amend, and extend some of the Powers and Provisions of "The Tees Conservancy and Stockton Dock Act, 1852," (Note: Tees Conservancy and Stockton Dock Act 1852 (15 & 16 Vict. c. clxii)) and for other Purposes relating to the Conservancy of the Tees. (Repealed by Tees and Hartlepools Port Authority Act 1966 (c. xxv))
Traethbach Bridge and Road Act 1854	17 & 18 Vict. c. cxcvi	24 July 1854
An Act for making a Turnpike Road from Garth-Penbryn to Adwyddu in the County of Merioneth, with a Bridge over the Estuary of Traethbach in the said County.
Torquay, Tor, and Saint Mary Church Gas Act 1854	17 & 18 Vict. c. cxcvii	24 July 1854
An Act to incorporate a Company for the Purpose of lighting with Gas the Parishes of Tormoham and Saint Mary Church in the County of Devon.
North Shields Quay Transfer Act 1854	17 & 18 Vict. c. cxcviii	31 July 1854
An Act for transferring to a Company the Powers vested in the Commissioners under "The North Shields Quay Act, 1851." (Note: North Shields Quay Act 1851 (14 & 15 Vict. c. lxxiii))
Selkirk and Galashiels Railway Act 1854 (repealed)	17 & 18 Vict. c. cxcix	31 July 1854
An Act for making a Railway from the Town and Royal Burgh of Selkirk to the Hawick Branch of the North British Railway, about a Mile Southwards from the Galashiels Station of the said Branch; and for other Purposes. (Repealed by North British and Selkirk Railways Amalgamation Act 1859 (22 & 23 Vict. c. xiv))
Stockport, Disley, and Whaley Bridge Railway Act 1854	17 & 18 Vict. c. cc	31 July 1854
An Act for making a Railway from the London and North-western Railway near Stockport to Disley and Whaley Bridge, all in the County of Chester; and for other Purposes.
London and North-western Railway Act 1854	17 & 18 Vict. c. cci	31 July 1854
An Act for authorizing the Transfer to the London and North-western Railway Company of the Haydon Square Branch of the London and Blackwall Railway, and for other Purposes; and of which the Short Title is "The London and North-western Railway Act, 1854."
Great Western Railway (Berks and Hants, and Wilts, Somerset and Weymouth) Act 1854	17 & 18 Vict. c. ccii	31 July 1854
An Act for enabling The Great Western Railway Company to make a Branch Railway to connect The Berks and Hants Railway with the Main Line of The Great Western Railway near Reading; for extending the Time for Completion of Parts of The Wilts, Somerset, and Weymouth Railway, and for reviving the Powers for Purchase of Land for, and for completing other Portions of that Railway; and for other Purposes.
Electric Telegraph Company Amendment Act 1854	17 & 18 Vict. c. cciii	31 July 1854
An Act for limiting the Liability of the Shareholders in the Electric Telegraph Company, and for granting additional Powers to such Company.
West London Railway Act 1854	17 & 18 Vict. c. cciv	31 July 1854
An Act for determining the existing Lease of the West London Railway to the London and North-western Railway Company, and for enabling the last-mentioned Company and the West London Railway Company to enter into fresh Arrangements for the Sale or Lease of the Undertaking of the West London Railway Company to the London and North-western Railway Company, and for the Settlement of all Disputes between the said Companies; and for other Purposes.
Westminster Terminus Railway Act 1854 (repealed)	17 & 18 Vict. c. ccv	31 July 1854
An Act for making a Railway from the Parish of Saint John the Evangelist in the City and Liberty of Westminster to Clapham in the County of Surrey, with a Branch from such Railway to join the authorized Line of the West End of London and Crystal Palace Railway at Long Hedge Farm in the Parish of Saint Mary Battersea in the County of Surrey. (Repealed by West End of London and Clapham and Norwood Junction Railway Act 1856 (19 & 20 Vict. c. cxxx))
Cork and Youghal Railway Act 1854	17 & 18 Vict. c. ccvi	31 July 1854
An Act to extend the Powers of the Cork and Waterford Railway Company, and to enable them to abandon Part of their Railway to Waterford, and the Branch to Tramore; and for other Purposes.
Oxford, Worcester and Wolverhampton Railway (Stratford and Stourbridge Branches) Act 1854	17 & 18 Vict. c. ccvii	31 July 1854
An Act to alter the Lines and Levels of the Stratford-upon-Avon and Stourbridge Branches of the Oxford, Worcester, and Wolverhampton Railway; to construct certain Branch Railways and Works connected therewith; to amend the Acts relating to the Oxford, Worcester, and Wolverhampton Railway Company; and for other Purposes.
Direct London and Portsmouth Railway Act 1854	17 & 18 Vict. c. ccviii	31 July 1854
An Act to authorize Agreements between the Direct London and Portsmouth Railway Company and the Portsmouth Railway Company, and for winding up the Affairs of the Direct London and Portsmouth Railway Company.
Oxford, Worcester and Wolverhampton Railway (Chipping Norton Branch) Act 1854	17 & 18 Vict. c. ccix	31 July 1854
An Act for enabling the Oxford, Worcester, and Wolverhampton Railway Company to construct a Branch Line of Railway to the Town of Chipping Norton in the County of Oxford, and for regulating the Working and Use of the same by such Company.
West London and Crystal Palace Railway (Extension to Farnborough) Act 1854	17 & 18 Vict. c. ccx	31 July 1854
An Act to enable the West End of London and Crystal Palace Railway Company to make a Railway from Norwood to Bromley and Farnborough, and for other Purposes.
North-eastern Railway Company's Act 1854 or the North Eastern Railway Act 1854	17 & 18 Vict. c. ccxi	31 July 1854
An Act to dissolve the York and North Midland and Leeds Northern Railway Companies, and to rest their Undertakings in the York, Newcastle, and Berwick Railway Company, to be thenceforth called "The North-eastern Railway Company," and to alter the Constitution of that Company, and to authorize Working Arrangements with the Malton and Driffield Junction Railway Company, and the Amalgamation of that Company with such United Company; and for other Purposes.
Border Counties Railway (North Tyne Section) Act 1854	17 & 18 Vict. c. ccxii	31 July 1854
An Act for making a Railway from the Newcastle-upon-Tyne and Carlisle Railway, at or near Hexham in the County of Northumberland, to or near the Belling in the Parish of Falstone in the same County, to be called "The Border Counties Railway (North Tyne Section);" and for other Purposes.
Ratcliffe Gas Company Relief Act 1854	17 & 18 Vict. c. ccxiii	31 July 1854
An Act for relieving the Ratcliff Gaslight and Coke Company, and their Servants and Agents, from certain Penalties and Penal Actions.
Great Northern and Ambergate Railway Companies (Working Arrangements) Act 1854	17 & 18 Vict. c. ccxiv	31 July 1854
An Act to authorize Working Arrangements between the Ambergate, Nottingham, and Boston, and Eastern Junction Railway Company and the Great Northern Railway Company, or Lease or Sale to the last-named Company.
Salisbury and Yeovil Railway Act 1854	17 & 18 Vict. c. ccxv	7 August 1854
An Act for making a Railway from the London and South-western Railway at Salisbury to Yeovil, and to form a Junction with the Railways at Yeovil of the Great Western and Bristol and Exeter Railway Companies respectively; and for other Purposes.
British Guarantee Association Act 1854	17 & 18 Vict. c. ccxvi	7 August 1854
An Act to repeal and amend the Act (Note: British Guarantee Association Act 1846 (9 & 10 Vict. c. ccclxxv)) for incorporating the British Guarantee Association, and to make further Provisions as to the Management and Regulation thereof.
Paisley Waterworks Act 1854	17 & 18 Vict. c. ccxvii	7 August 1854
An Act to transfer the Paisley Waterworks to the Magistrates and Council of Paisley, and to enable them to construct additional Works for supplying Paisley, Johnstone, and Places adjacent, with Water.
Carmarthen and Cardigan Railway Act 1854	17 & 18 Vict. c. ccxviii	7 August 1854
An Act for making a Railway from the South Wales Railway at or near the Borough of Carmarthen to the Town of Newcastle Emlyn, with a view of being hereafter extended to the Town and Harbour of Cardigan; and for other Purposes.
Oxford Poor Act 1854 or the Oxford Poor Rate Act 1854 (repealed)	17 & 18 Vict. c. ccxix	7 August 1854
An Act to repeal an "Act for better regulating the Poor within the City of Oxford," (Note: Oxford (Poor Relief) Act 1771 (11 Geo. 3. c. 14)) and to grant further and more effectual Powers in lieu thereof; and also to provide for rating to the Relief of the Poor certain Hereditaments within the University of Oxford. (Repealed by Oxford Corporation Act 1933 (23 & 24 Geo. 5. c. xxi))
Eastern Counties and the Norfolk and Eastern Union, the East Anglian, and the Newmarket Railways Act 1854 (repealed)	17 & 18 Vict. c. ccxx	7 August 1854
An Act for authorizing and confirming Arrangements and Agreements between the Eastern Counties Railway Company and all or any of the Norfolk, the Eastern Union, the East Anglian, and the Newmarket Railway Companies, and for other Purposes; and of which the Short Title is "The Eastern Counties, and the Norfolk, the Eastern Union, the East Anglian, and the Newmarket Railways Act, 1854." (Repealed by Great Eastern Railway Act 1862 (25 & 26 Vict. c. ccxxiii))
Metropolitan Railway Act 1854 or the North Metropolitan Railway Act 1854	17 & 18 Vict. c. ccxxi	7 August 1854
An Act to alter and extend the North Metropolitan Railway, and to consolidate and amend the Provisions relating thereto.
Great Western, Birmingham and Chester Railways Act 1854	17 & 18 Vict. c. ccxxii	7 August 1854
An Act to authorize the Consolidation into One Undertaking of the Great Western, the Shrewsbury and Birmingham, and the Shrewsbury and Chester Railways, and the Union into One Company of the Three several Companies to whom the said Railways respectively belong.

=== Private acts ===
Short title	Citation	Royal assent
Long title
Swinnerton's Name Act 1854	17 & 18 Vict. c. 1 Pr.	16 June 1854
An Act to authorize Sir William Milborne Milborne Swinnerton Baronet, and his Issue, to resume and bear the Surname of Pilkington jointly with the Surnames of Milborne and Swinnerton and to be called by the Surnames of Milborne Swinnerton Pilkington, and for such Purposes to repeal in part an Act of the Sixth and Seventh Years of the Reign of His late Majesty King William the Fourth. (Note: Pilkington's Name Act 1836 (6 & 7 Will. 4. c. 52 Pr.))
Fleming's Estate Act 1854	17 & 18 Vict. c. 2 Pr.	7 July 1854
An Act to amend "Fleming's Estate Act, 1852." (Note: Fleming's Estate Act 1858 (15 & 16 Vict. c. 19 Pr.))
Violetta Masters' Estate Act 1854	17 & 18 Vict. c. 3 Pr.	7 July 1854
An Act for effecting an Extinguishment of the Life Estate and Interest of Mistress Violetta Matters and the Trustee of her Marriage Settlement of and in a Freehold Close or Parcel of Land situate in the Parish of Saint Margaret, Leicester.
Henry Smith's Charity Estate Act 1854	17 & 18 Vict. c. 4 Pr.	7 July 1854
An Act to enable the Trustees of the Estates of Henry Smith Esquire, deceased, or any Seven or more of them, to grant Building Leases of an Estate in the Parishes of Kensington, Chelsea, and Saint Martin in the Fields in the County of Middlesex, and for the Confirmation of certain Leases, and to enable Seven or more of the said Trustees to make Leases and Estates, pursuant to the Deed of Uses of the said Henry Smith, and for other Purposes.
Thornhill's Estate Act 1854	17 & 18 Vict. c. 5 Pr.	7 July 1854
An Act for enlarging the Powers contained in "Thornhill's Estate Act, 1852," (Note: Thornhill's Estate Act 1852 (15 & 16 Vict. c. 20 Pr.)) and for granting further Powers in respect of the Thornhill Estate.
William Green's Estate Act 1854	17 & 18 Vict. c. 6 Pr.	10 July 1854
An Act for authorizing the granting of Building Leases of Lands held under the Will of William Green deceased, situate at Runworth in the County of Lancaster.
Wyndham's Estate Act 1854	17 & 18 Vict. c. 7 Pr.	10 July 1854
An Act for granting Powers of Leasing, Sale, and Exchange, and other Powers, for the Management of Freehold, Copyhold, and Leasehold Estates devised by or which now stand limited to the Uses of the Will of the Right Honourable George Obrien Earl of Egremont deceased.
Fowler's Estate Act 1854	17 & 18 Vict. c. 8 Pr.	24 July 1854
An Act for authorizing the Sale of Estates devised by the Will of John Fowler deceased, and for other Purposes; and of which the Short Title is "Fowlers Estate Act, 1854."
Woking Commoners Act 1854	17 & 18 Vict. c. 9 Pr.	24 July 1854
An Act for the Distribution of the Compensation paid under the London Necropolis and National Mausoleum Act, 1852, (Note: London Necropolis and National Mausoleum Act 1852 (15 & 16 Vict. c. cxlix)) for the Extinction of the Commonable or other Rights over and in Woking Common; and whereof the Short Title is "Woking Commoners Act, 1854."
Davies's Estate Act 1854	17 & 18 Vict. c. 10 Pr.	24 July 1854
An Act to enable certain Persons to grant Leases for Building and Mining Purposes of the Estates in the Parishes of Penderryn and Ystradfellte in the County of Brecon, devised by the Will of the Reverend Reynold Davies Clerk, deceased.
Landon's Estate Act 1854	17 & 18 Vict. c. 11 Pr.	24 July 1854
An Act for enabling Sales to be made of Estates at Manningham in the Parish of Bradford, and at Idle in the Parish of Calverley, both in the West Riding of the County of York, devised by the Will of William Snell; and for other Purposes.
Aberdeen Shoemakers Incorporation Act 1854	17 & 18 Vict. c. 12 Pr.	24 July 1854
An Act to incorporate the Craft of Shoemakers of the Burgh of Aberdeen; to confirm the Titles and Conveyances, and to regulate the Administration of the Estates and Affairs, of the said Craft; and for other Purposes relating to the Society.
Ward's Estate Act 1854	17 & 18 Vict. c. 13 Pr.	24 July 1854
An Act for enabling Leases, Sales, and Exchanges to be made of Lands subject to the Will of George Ward deceased, and for other Purposes, and of which the Short Title is "Ward's Estate Act, 1854."
Darby Estate Act 1854	17 & 18 Vict. c. 14 Pr.	24 July 1854
An Act for the better Division and Management of certain Estates in the County of Lancaster, the Property of Abraham and (the late) Alfred Darby Esquires.
Jenkins's Estate Act 1854	17 & 18 Vict. c. 15 Pr.	24 July 1854
An Act for authorizing the granting of Leases of Mines in Estates in the County of Glamorgan, devised by the Will of the Reverend Reynold Davies deceased, and for other Purposes, and of which the Short Title is "Jenkins's Estate Act, 1854."
Wilkinson's Estate Act 1854	17 & 18 Vict. c. 16 Pr.	31 July 1854
An Act to enable the Trustees of the Will of Anthony Wilkinson Esquire, deceased, to grant Leases.
Merton College Estate Act 1854	17 & 18 Vict. c. 17 Pr.	31 July 1854
An Act to empower the Warden and Scholars of the House or College of Scholars of Merton in the University of Oxford to sell certain Lands situate in the Parish of Holywell otherwise Saint Cross in the City of Oxford, and to lay out the Monies to arise from such Sales in the Purchase of other Hereditaments.
Mitford's Estate Act 1854	17 & 18 Vict. c. 18 Pr.	31 July 1854
An Act to authorize the Sale of certain Messuages, Lands, and Hereditaments in the East Riding of the County of York, Part of the Estates devised and settled by the Will of Bertram Osbaldeston Mitford Esquire, deceased, and for lying out the Money produced by such Sale in the Purchase of other Estates.
Blervie Estate Act 1854	17 & 18 Vict. c. 19 Pr.	31 July 1854
An Act to enable the Trustees of the Right Honourable James Earl of Fife deceased to complete the Sale of the outlying Estate of Blervie in the County of Moray, and to reinvest the Sale Monies in the Purchase of more convenient Estates, to be settled upon the same Trusts; and for other Purposes.
Stainforth's Estate Act 1854	17 & 18 Vict. c. 20 Pr.	31 July 1854
An Act for vesting in Trustees for Sale the settled and devised Estates oi Richard Terrick Stainforth Esquire, deceased; and for other Purposes.
Sir Gilbert Stirling's Estate Act 1854	17 & 18 Vict. c. 21 Pr.	31 July 1854
An Act to extend the Time during which the Trustees of the late Sir Gilbert Stirling of Mansfield Baronet were authorized to purchase Lands to be entailed in the Terms declared by certain Trust Deeds executed by him; to enable the Trustees to purchase within any Part of Scotland; to regulate the Powers of borrowing conferred by the said Deeds; and for other Purposes relating thereto.
Thornhill's Copyhold Estate Act 1854	17 & 18 Vict. c. 22 Pr.	31 July 1854
An Act to enable the Trustees of a Settlement executed prior to the Marriage of Thomas Thornhill, late of Fixby in the County of York, Esquire, deceased, with Honoria Forrester Spinster, to grant Building and other Leases of the Estates subject to the Trusts of the said Settlement, and to sell and exchange the same; and for other Purposes.
Saint Catherine's Parish (Dublin) Estates Act 1854	17 & 18 Vict. c. 23 Pr.	31 July 1854
An Act for incorporating the Trustees of the School and Charity Estates and Property belonging to the Parish of Saint Catherine in the County and County of the City of Dublin, for the better Management of such Estates and Property, and for the due and careful Application of the Income of the same.
Stockport Rectory Division Act 1854	17 & 18 Vict. c. 24 Pr.	31 July 1854
An Act to ascertain the Periods when the Division, under the Church Building Acts, of the Parish of Stockport in the County Palatine of Chester into the Two distinct and separate Parishes of Saint Mary in Stockport and Saint Thomas in Stockport shall take complete Effect, and the Exercise of the Rights of Presentation to the Rectories or Churches of the same Parishes respectively shall commence; and for other Purposes.
Earl of Harrington's Estate Act 1854	17 & 18 Vict. c. 25 Pr.	7 August 1854
An Act to extend the Power to lease the Settled Estates of the Earl of Harrington, situate in the Parishes of St. Margaret Westminster and St. Mary Abbotts Kensington in the County of Middlesex, and for other Purposes; and to be entitled "The Earl of Harrington's Estate Act, 1854."
Lord Willoughby de Broke's Estate Act 1854	17 & 18 Vict. c. 26 Pr.	7 August 1854
An Act for vesting certain Estates in the County of Lincoln, entailed by an Act of Parliament of the Twenty-seventh Year of the Reign of His Majesty King Henry the Eighth, (Note: Partition of Lands between the heirs of Lord Broke Act 1535 (27 Hen. 8. c. 44)) in Trustees, upon trust to sell the same, and to lay out the Monies thence arising in the Purchase of other Estates, to be settled to the same Uses as the Estates so sold.
Thomas Sewell's Estate Act 1854	17 & 18 Vict. c. 27 Pr.	7 August 1854
An Act for vesting in Trustees, for Sale, under the Authority of the Court of Chancery, an Estate in the County of Surrey, acquired by Partition under the Decree of that Court in lieu of those undivided Shares of Freehold Property devised by the Will of Thomas Bailey Heath Sewell Esquire, deceased, Trusts of which are declared by that Will for the Benefit of the Testator's Son and his Issue therein described; and for investing the Monies to arise from such Sale for the Benefit of the Parties beneficially interested in the same Estate.
Earl of Eglinton's Estate Act 1854	17 & 18 Vict. c. 28 Pr.	7 August 1854
An Act to provide for the Winding-up of the Trust Affairs of the late Hugh Earl of Eglinton, and to amend the Acts relative to Ardrossan Harbour in the County of Ayr; and for other Purposes.
Staveley's Estate Act 1854	17 & 18 Vict. c. 29 Pr.	7 August 1854
An Act to authorize the granting of Mining and Farming Leases of Estates subject to the Uses of the Will of Miles Staveley Esquire.
Peel's Estate Act 1854	17 & 18 Vict. c. 30 Pr.	7 August 1854
An Act to authorize the granting of Building Leases for long Terms of Years of Parts of the Estates devised by the Will of Joseph Peel Esquire, deceased.
Hornyold's Estate Act 1854	17 & 18 Vict. c. 31 Pr.	7 August 1854
An Act to authorize the granting of Building and other Leases of the Settled Estates of Thomas Charles Hornyold Esquire in the Counties of Worcester and Hereford; and for other Purposes.
Park's Estate Act 1854	17 & 18 Vict. c. 32 Pr.	7 August 1854
An Act for authorizing the granting of Building, Improving, and Mining Leases by the Reverend James Allan Park Clerk, as Tenant for Life in possession, and other Persons in succession after his Death, of Settled Estates at Marton in the County of York, comprised in an Indenture of Settlement dated the Sixteenth Day of July One thousand eight hundred and fifty-two; and for other Purposes.
Petre Estate Act 1854	17 & 18 Vict. c. 33 Pr.	7 August 1854
An Act for authorizing the granting of Building Leases and Leases for working Brick Earth, of Settled Estates in the County of Essex, of the Right Honourable William Bernard Lord Petre Baron of Writtle in the County of Essex, and of which Act the Short Title is "The Petre Estate Act, 1854."
Mowbrick Estate Partition Act 1854	17 & 18 Vict. c. 34 Pr.	10 August 1854
An Act for the Partition of the Mowbrick otherwise Mowbreck Estate in the County of Lancaster.
Bradford Vicarage Estate Act 1854	17 & 18 Vict. c. 35 Pr.	10 August 1854
An Act to authorize the Sale or Exchange of the Glebe Land of the Vicarage of the Parish of Bradford in the West Riding of the County of York, and of other Land in the said Parish of Bradford, held in trust for and to be henceforth vested in the Vicar of Bradford; and to authorize Leases of the said Lands respectively; and for other Purposes.
Baron De L'Isle and Dudley's Estate Act 1854	17 & 18 Vict. c. 36 Pr.	10 August 1854
An Act for enabling the granting of Leases for Mining and other Purposes, and the making of Sales and Exchanges, of certain Part of the Estates devised by the Will and Codicils of Sir William Foulis Baronet, deceased.
Worsley's Estate Act 1854	17 & 18 Vict. c. 37 Pr.	10 August 1854
An Act for authorizing the granting of Building, Improving, and Mining Leases of Estates in the Parish of Rochdale in the County of Lancaster, comprised, as to certain undivided Shares, in the Marriage Settlement of Marcus Worsley and Harriet his Wife, and devised, as to the other undivided Shares, by the Will of Sarah Hamer deceased.
Adlington Estate Act 1854	17 & 18 Vict. c. 38 Pr.	10 August 1854
Ad Act to authorize Conveyances in Fee or Demises for long Terms of Years, under reserved Rents, of certain Parts of the Settled Estates of Charles Richard Banastre Legh Esquire.
Lord Lovat's Restitution Act 1854 (Note: This act was not printed by the Queen's Printer.)	17 & 18 Vict. c. 39 Pr.	10 July 1854
An Act to relieve Thomas Alexander Lord Lovat Baron Lovat of Lovat in the County of Inverness from the Effect of the Attainder of Simon Lord Lovat.
Caton's Divorce Act 1854	17 & 18 Vict. c. 40 Pr.	31 July 1854
An Act to dissolve the Marriage of Richard Redmond Caton Esquire with Anna Maria his now Wife, and to enable him to marry again; and for other Purposes.
Stocker's Divorce Act 1854	17 & 18 Vict. c. 41 Pr.	11 August 1854
An Act to dissolve the Marriage of Henry Stacker Schoolmaster with Sarah Slacker his now Wife, and to enable him to marry again; and for other Purposes.

=== Sources ===
- The Statutes of the United Kingdom of Great Britain and Ireland. 17 & 18 Victoria. 1854. London. 1807 – via Internet Archive.

== See also ==
- List of acts of the Parliament of the United Kingdom
