= Cruelty to Animals Act 1849 =

Act of the Parliament of the United Kingdom

Cruelty to Animals Act 1849 (Note: The citation of this act by this short title was authorised by section 1 of, and the first schedule to, the Short Titles Act 1896. Due to the repeal of those provisions it is now authorised by section 19(2) of the Interpretation Act 1978.)
- Act of Parliament
- Parliament of the United Kingdom
- Long title: An Act for the more effectual Prevention of Cruelty to Animals.
- Citation: 12 & 13 Vict. c. 92
- Territorial extent: England and Wales; Ireland; (Note: Section 30.)

Dates
- Royal assent: 1 August 1849
- Commencement: 1 August 1849 (Note: Section 1.)
- Repealed: 1 January 1912
Other legislation
Repeals/revokes	Cruel Treatment of Cattle Act 1822; Cruelty to Animals Act 1835
Amended by	Cruelty to Animals Act 1854; Statute Law Revision Act 1875; Cruelty to Animals Act 1876; Statute Law Revision Act 1878; Summary Jurisdiction Act 1884; Public Authorities Protection Act 1893
Repealed by	Protection of Animals Act 1911
Relates to	Cruelty to Animals (Scotland) Act 1850; Wild Animals in Captivity Protection Act 1900; Animals (Scientific Procedures) Act 1986

Status: Repealed

Text of statute as originally enacted

The Cruelty to Animals Act 1849 (12 & 13 Vict. c. 92) was an act of the Parliament of the United Kingdom with the long title An Act for the more effectual Prevention of Cruelty to Animals.

The Cruelty to Animals (Scotland) Act 1850 (13 & 14 Vict. c. 92) made similar provisions for Scotland.

== Provisions ==
Section 1 of the act repealed two previous acts, the Cruel Treatment of Cattle Act 1822 (3 Geo. 4. c. 71) and the Cruelty to Animals Act 1835 (5 & 6 Will. 4. c. 59).

The act reiterated the offences of beating, ill-treating, over-driving, abusing and torturing animals with a maximum penalty of £5 and compensation of up to £10.

== Subsequent developments ==
The act was amended and including a prison sentence for the unlawful killing of any animals covers within the law and expanded by the Cruelty to Animals Act 1876 (39 & 40 Vict. c. 77).

Section 27 of the act was repealed by section 2 of, and the schedule to, the Public Authorities Protection Act 1893 (56 & 57 Vict. c. 61), which came into force on 1 January 1894.

The whole act was repealed by section 18 of, and the second schedule to, the Protection of Animals Act 1911 (1 & 2 Geo. 5. c. 27), which came into force on 1 January 1912.

== See also ==
- Animals (Scientific Procedures) Act 1986
- Wild Animals in Captivity Protection Act 1900
- Animal welfare in the United Kingdom

== Bibliography ==
- The British Almanac of the Society for the Diffusion of Useful Knowledge, 1850, p. 142.
