= Duchy of Cornwall Office Act 1854 =

Act of the Parliament of the United Kingdom

Duchy of Cornwall Office Act 1854 (Note: The citation of this act by this short title was authorised by section 2 of, and schedule 3 to, the Statute Law (Repeals) Act 1978.)
- Act of Parliament
- Parliament of the United Kingdom
- Long title: An Act for the Exchange of the Office in Somerset House of the Duchy of Cornwall for an Office to be erected in Pimlico on the Hereditary Possessions of the Crown.
- Citation: 17 & 18 Vict. c. 93
- Territorial extent: United Kingdom

Dates
- Royal assent: 10 August 1854
- Commencement: 10 August 1854 (Note: The Acts of Parliament (Commencement) Act 1793)

Status: Current legislation

Text of statute as originally enacted

The Duchy of Cornwall Office Act 1854 (17 & 18 Vict. c. 93) is an act of the Parliament of the United Kingdom. It is a public general act. The act was omitted from the third revised edition of the statutes because of its local and personal nature.

The act moved the office of the Duchy of Cornwall from Somerset House, where the space they occupied was wanted by the Inland Revenue. It was to move to a building to be constructed in Pimlico, on Crown Estate land, at 10 Buckingham Gate. As of 2026 the Duchy of Cornwall continue to occupy the building as their offices.

As of 2026, the act remains in force in the United Kingdom.
