= Animals (Scientific Procedures) Act 1986 =

Act of the Parliament of the United Kingdom

Animals (Scientific Procedures) Act 1986 (Note: Section 30(1).)
- Act of Parliament
- Parliament of the United Kingdom
- Long title: An Act to make new provision for the protection of animals used for experimental or other scientific purposes.
- Citation: 1986 c. 14
- Territorial extent: United Kingdom

Dates
- Royal assent: 20 May 1986
- Commencement: 1 January 1987 (part); (Note: The Animals (Scientific Procedures) (1986 Act) (Commencement No. 1) Order (Northern Ireland) 1986 and the Animals (Scientific Procedures) Act (Commencement) Order 1986); 1 January 1990 (full) (Note: The Animals (Scientific Procedures) Act (Commencement No. 2) Order 1989 and the Animals (Scientific Procedures) (1986 Act) (Commencement No. 2) Order (Northern Ireland) 1989.); (Note: Section 30(3).)

Other legislation
- Amended by: Protection of Badgers Act 1992

Status: Amended

Text of statute as originally enacted

Revised text of statute as amended

Text of the Animals (Scientific Procedures) Act 1986 as in force today (including any amendments) within the United Kingdom, from legislation.gov.uk.

The Animals (Scientific Procedures) Act 1986 (c. 14), sometimes referred to as ASPA, is an act of the Parliament of the United Kingdom passed in 1986, which regulates the use of animals used for research in the UK. The act permits studies to be conducted using animals for procedures such as breeding genetically modified animals, medical and veterinary advances, education, environmental toxicology and includes procedures requiring surgery, if certain criteria are met. Revised legislation came into force on 1 January 2013. The original act related to the 1986 EU Directive 86/609/EEC which was updated and replaced by EU Directive 2010/63/EU

In 2002, a Government select committee inquiry described the Act as the "...tightest system of regulation in the world" in relation to the regulation of using animals for research.

== Background ==
Prior to ASPA, the use of animals in the UK was regulated by the Cruelty to Animals Act 1876, which enforced a licensing and inspection system for vivisection. Animal cruelty was previously regulated by the Protection of Animals Act 1911 (now largely repealed) and more recently by the Animal Welfare Act 2006, both of which outlaw the causing of "unnecessary suffering". Specific exemptions apply to experiments licensed under the 1986 Act.

== History and scope ==
The act defined regulated procedures as animal experiments that could potentially cause "pain, suffering, distress or lasting harm", to protected animals, which encompassed all living vertebrates other than humans, under the responsibility of humans. A 1993 amendment added a single invertebrate species, the common octopus (Octopus vulgaris), as a protected animal. The act applied only to protected animals from halfway through their gestation or incubation periods (for mammals, birds and reptiles) or from when they became capable of independent feeding (for fish, amphibians, and the common octopuses). Primates, cats, dogs and horses had additional protection over other vertebrates under the Act.

Revised legislation came into force on 1 January 2013. The act has been expanded to protect -

...all living vertebrates, other than man, and any living cephalopod. Fish and amphibia are protected once they can feed independently and cephalopods at the point when they hatch. Embryonic and foetal forms of mammals, birds and reptiles are protected during the last third of their gestation or incubation period.

The definition of regulated procedures was expanded to -

A procedure is regulated if it is carried out on a protected animal and may cause that animal a level of pain, suffering, distress or lasting harm equivalent to, or higher than, that caused by inserting a hypodermic needle according to good veterinary practice.

ASPA also regulates the modification of genes in protected animals if this causes the animal pain, suffering, distress or lasting harm. Other considerations in the Act include animal sources, housing conditions, identification methods and the humane killing of animals. This legislation is widely regarded as the strictest in the world protecting animals used in research. Those applying for a license must explain why such research cannot be done through non-animal or in-vitro methods. The project must also pass an ethical review panel which aims to decide if the potential benefits outweigh any suffering for the animals involved.

== Licences and certificates ==
ASPA involves three levels of regulation — person, project, and place.

The 'person' level is achieved by the granting of a "personal licence" (PIL, procedure individual licence) to a researcher wishing to carry out regulated procedures on a protected animal. Having undergone a defined sequence of training, a researcher can apply for a PIL permitting specified techniques to be carried out on named species of animals.

The 'project' level of regulation is governed by the granting of a "project licence" (PPL) to a suitably qualified senior researcher. The PPL details the scope of the work to be carried out, the likely benefits that may be realised by the work, and the costs involved in terms of the numbers and types of animals to be used, and the harm that might be caused to the animals. Typically a large and detailed document, the PPL precisely defines which techniques may be applied to particular animals and for what purpose.

Finally, the 'place' where regulated procedures are carried out is controlled by the granting of a "establishment licence" (PEL) to a senior authority figure at the establishment, such as the Registrar or Vice-chancellor of a University, or the Chief executive officer of a commercial company. The PEL details which rooms in the establishment are permitted to be used for certain techniques and species, but may also apply to outdoors areas and even mobile areas (e.g. boats) if this is where the research is to be conducted.

It is an offence under ASPA to carry out regulated procedures on a protected animal unless authorised by a personal licence, a project licence, and an establishment licence.

== Opinion ==
A 2002 House of Lords select committee inquiry compared the Act to legislation from France, the U.S., and Japan. The report concluded that "virtually all witnesses agreed that the UK has the tightest system of regulation in the world" and that it is "the only country to require an explicit cost/benefit assessment of every application to conduct animal research." Costs are explicitly in terms of adverse effects on animals, not the financial cost to the experimenters. This has since been re-named the harm/benefit analysis.

In 2005, Patricia Hewitt, then British Secretary of State for Trade and Industry, called the Act "[among] the strongest laws in the world to protect animals which are being used for medical research."

A 2006 report by Animal Aid called the Act a "vivisectors' charter", alleging that it allows researchers to do as they please and makes them practically immune from prosecution. The report said that licences to perform experiments are obtained on the basis of a "nod of approval" from the Home Office Inspectorate, and that the Home Office relies on the researchers' own cost-benefit analysis of the value of the experiment versus the suffering caused.

== See also ==
- Animal law
- Pain in animals
- Pain in invertebrates
- Animal welfare in the United Kingdom
