= Cruelty to Animals Act 1876 =

Act of the Parliament of the United Kingdom

Cruelty to Animals Act 1876 (Note: Section 1. Due to the repeal of this act, it is now authorised by section 19(2) of the Interpretation Act 1978.)
- Act of Parliament
- Parliament of the United Kingdom
- Long title: An Act to amend the Law relating to Cruelty to Animals.
- Citation: 39 & 40 Vict. c. 77
- Territorial extent: United Kingdom

Dates
- Royal assent: 15 August 1876
- Commencement: 15 August 1876 (Note: The Acts of Parliament (Commencement) Act 1793.)
- Repealed: 1 January 1987 (Note: The Animals (Scientific Procedures) (1986 Act) (Commencement No. 1) Order (Northern Ireland) 1986 (SI 1986/364) and the Animals (Scientific Procedures) Act (Commencement) Order 1986 (SI 1986/2088).)
Other legislation
Amends	Cruelty to Animals Act 1849
Amended by	Summary Jurisdiction Act 1884; Courts Act 1971
Repealed by	Animals (Scientific Procedures) Act 1986
Relates to	Wild Animals in Captivity Protection Act 1900

Status: Repealed

Text of statute as originally enacted

The Cruelty to Animals Act 1876 (39 & 40 Vict. c. 77) was an act of the Parliament of the United Kingdom which set limits on the practice of, and instituted a licensing system for animal experimentation, amending the Cruelty to Animals Act 1849 (12 & 13 Vict. c. 92).

== Provisions ==
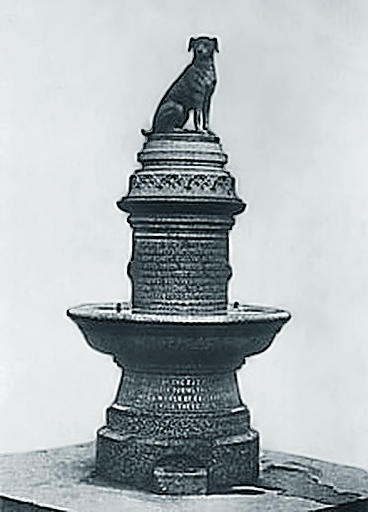
A perception that the Cruelty to Animals Act 1876 was weak led to a libel suit, the erection of this monument to a vivisected "brown dog", and riots by medical students in 1907

The act stipulated that researchers would be prosecuted for cruelty, unless they conformed to its provisions, which required that an experiment involving the infliction of pain upon animals to only be conducted when "the proposed experiments are absolutely necessary for the due instruction of the persons [so they may go on to use the instruction] to save or prolong human life".

Furthermore, the act stated that should the experiment occur, the animal must be anaesthetised, used only once (though several procedures regarded as part of the same experiment were permitted), and killed as soon as the study was over. Prosecutions under the act could be made only with the approval of the Secretary of State. The Act was applicable to vertebrate animals only.

== History and controversy ==
Opposition to vivisection had led the government to set up a Royal Commission on Vivisection in July 1875, which recommended that legislation be enacted to control it. This Act was created as a result, but was criticized by National Anti-Vivisection Society – itself founded in December 1875 – as "infamous but well-named," in that it made no provision for public accountability of licensing decisions. The law remained in force for 110 years, until it was replaced by the Animals (Scientific Procedures) Act 1986, which is the subject of similar criticism from the modern animal rights movement.

Such was the perceived weakness of the act, that vivisection opponents chose, on at least one occasion – the Brown Dog affair – to incite a libel suit rather than seek a prosecution under the act.

== Penalties ==
The act stated, in part:

Any person performing or taking part in performing any experiment calculated to give pain, in contravention of this Act, shall be guilty of an offence against this Act, and shall, if it be the first offence, be liable to a penalty not exceeding fifty pounds, and if it be the second or any subsequent offence, be liable, at the discretion of the court by which he is tried, to a penalty not exceeding one hundred pounds or to imprisonment for a period not exceeding three months.

== Subsequent developments ==
The whole act was repealed by section 27(1) of the Animals (Scientific Procedures) Act 1986, which came into force on 1 January 1987.

== See also ==
- Wild Animals in Captivity Protection Act 1900
- Animal welfare in the United Kingdom

== Bibliography ==
- Halsbury's Statutes of England. (The Complete Statutes of England). First Edition. Butterworth and Co (Publishers) Ltd. 1929. Volume 1: . Page 367. Third Edition. 1968. Volume 2. Page 222. Cumulative Supplement. Part 1. 1985. Paragraph for page 221.
- John Mounteney Lely. The Statutes of Practical Utility. (Chitty's Statutes). Fifth Edition. Sweet and Maxwell. Stevens and Sons. London. 1894. Volume 1. Title "Animals". Pages 12 to 17.
- Paterson, William. The Practical Statutes of the Session 1876. Pages 245 to 255.
- Coleridge, Bernard. Commentary on the Cruelty to Animals Act, 1876. Victoria Street and International Society for the Protection of Animals from Vivisection. Victoria Street London. 1896. Google Books. Reprinted from the Zoophillist as chapter 23 of "The Anti-vivisection Question".
- Coleridge, Stephen, "The Administration of the Cruelty to Animals Act of 1876" (1900) 67 Fortnightly Review 392 (No 399, March)
- "The First Conviction under the Vivisection Act" (1876) 61 The Law Times 382 (7 October)
