= Protection of Animals Act 1911 =

Act of the Parliament of the United Kingdom

Protection of Animals Act 1911 (Note: Section 19(3).)
- Act of Parliament
- Parliament of the United Kingdom
- Long title: An Act to consolidate, amend, and extend certain enactments relating to Animals and to Knackers; and to make further provision with respect thereto
- Citation: 1 & 2 Geo. 5. c. 27
- Territorial extent: England and Wales; Ireland; (Note: Section 16.)

Dates
- Royal assent: 18 August 1911
- Commencement: 1 January 1912 (Note: Section 19(2).)
Other legislation
| Amends | See § Repealed enactments |
| Repeals/revokes | Cruelty to Animals Act 1849; Cruelty to Animals Act 1854; Poisoned Grain Prohibition Act 1863; Poisoned Flesh Prohibition Act 1864; Drugging of Animals Act 1876; Wild Animals in Captivity Protection Act 1900; Injured Animals Act 1907 |
| Amended by | Protection of Animals Act (1911) Amendment Act 1912; Statute Law Revision Act 1927; Criminal Justice Act 1972; Statute Law (Repeals) Act 1976; Hunting Act 2004; Animal Welfare Act 2006 |
| Repealed by | Republic of Ireland: Animal Health and Welfare Act 2013 |
| Relates to | Protection of Animals (Scotland) Act 1912 |

Status: Partially repealed

Text of statute as originally enacted

Revised text of statute as amended

Text of the Protection of Animals Act 1911 as in force today (including any amendments) within the United Kingdom, from legislation.gov.uk.

The Protection of Animals Act 1911 (1 & 2 Geo. 5. c. 27) is an act of the Parliament of the United Kingdom that consolidated legislation relating to animal welfare in the United Kingdom. It received royal assent on 18 August 1911.

== Provisions ==
=== Repealed enactments ===
Section 18 of the act repealed 9 enactments, listed in the second schedule to the act.

| Citation | Short title | Description | Extent of repeal |
|---|---|---|---|
| 26 Geo. 3. c. 71 | Knackers Act 1786 | The Knackers Act, 1786 | Section four. |
| 7 & 8 Vict. c. 87 | Knackers Act 1844 | The Knackers Act, 1844 | Section three. |
| 12 & 13 Vict. c. 92 | Cruelty to Animals Act 1849 | The Cruelty to Animals Act, 1849 | The whole act, so far as not already repealed. |
| 17 & 18 Vict. c. 60. | Cruelty to Animals Act 1854 | The Cruelty to Animals Act, 1854 | The whole act. |
| 26 & 27 Vict. c. 113 | Poisoned Grain Prohibition Act 1863 | The Poisoned Grain Prohibition Act, 1863 | The whole act. |
| 27 & 28 Vict. c. 115 | Poisoned Flesh Prohibition Act 1864 | The Poisoned Flesh Prohibition Act, 1864 | The whole act. |
| 39 & 40 Vict. c. 13 | Drugging of Animals Act 1876 | The Drugging of Animals Act, 1876 | The whole act. |
| 63 & 64 Vict. c. 33 | Wild Animals in Captivity Protection Act 1900 | The Wild Animals in Captivity Protection Act, 1900 | The whole act. |
| 7 Edw. 7. c. 5 | Injured Animals Act 1907 | The Injured Animals Act, 1907 | The whole act. |

== Subsequent developments ==
The Protection of Animals (Scotland) Act 1912 (2 & 3 Geo. 5. c. 14) made similar provisions for Scotland. Section 18(1) of that act extended the acts repealed by the 1911 act to Scotland. Section 18(2) repealed 3 enactments, listed in the second schedule to the act.

Section 4 of the act was repealed by section 64(2) of, and part II of schedule 6 to, the Criminal Justice Act 1972, which came into force on 1 January 1973.

Section 17 of the act was repealed by section 1(1) of, and part III of schedule 1 to, the Statute Law (Repeals) Act 1976, which came into force on 27 May 1976.

The act was largely repealed and replaced by the Animal Welfare Act 2006, which consolidated many different forms of animal welfare legislation.

== See also ==
- Wild Animals in Captivity Protection Act 1900
- Animal welfare in the United Kingdom
