= Protection of Animals (Scotland) Act 1912 =

Act of the Parliament of the United Kingdom

Protection of Animals (Scotland) Act 1912 (Note: Section 16(3).)
- Act of Parliament
- Parliament of the United Kingdom
- Long title: An Act to consolidate and amend enactments relating to Animals and Knackers; and to make further provision with respect thereto.
- Citation: 2 & 3 Geo. 5. c. 14
- Territorial extent: Scotland (Note: Section 14.)

Dates
- Royal assent: 13 December 1912
- Commencement: 1 January 1913 (Note: Section 16(1).)
Other legislation
Amends	Knackers Act 1786; Knackers Act 1844
Repeals/revokes	See § Repealed enactments
Amended by	Statute Law Revision Act 1927; Slaughter of Animals (Amendment) Act 1954; Criminal Procedure (Scotland) Act 1975; Criminal Justice (Scotland) Act 1980; Law Reform (Miscellaneous Provisions) (Scotland) Act 1985; Criminal Procedure (Consequential Provisions) (Scotland) Act 1995; Protection of Wild Mammals (Scotland) Act 2002; Animal Health and Welfare (Scotland) Act 2006
Relates to	Protection of Animals Act 1911

Status: Partially repealed

Text of statute as originally enacted

Revised text of statute as amended

Text of the Protection of Animals (Scotland) Act 1912 as in force today (including any amendments) within the United Kingdom, from legislation.gov.uk.

The Protection of Animals (Scotland) Act 1912 (2 & 3 Geo. 5. c. 14) is an act of the Parliament of the United Kingdom that consolidated and amended enactments relating to the protection of animals and the regulation of knackers in Scotland.

== Provisions ==
=== Repealed enactments ===
Section 15(2) of the act repealed 3 enactments, listed in the second schedule to the act. Section 15(1) of the act extended to Scotland the repeal, by section 18 of the Protection of Animals Act 1911 (1 & 2 Geo. 5. c. 27), of the 9 enactments listed in the second schedule to that act.

Citation	Short title	Extent of repeal
13 & 14 Vict. c. 92	Cruelty to Animals (Scotland) Act 1850	The whole act.
58 & 59 Vict. c. 13	Cruelty to Animals (Scotland) Act 1895	The whole act.
9 Edw. 7. c. 33	Wild Animals in Captivity Protection (Scotland) Act 1909	The whole act.

== Subsequent developments ==
Section 15, section 16(1) and (2), and the second schedule, all by then spent, were repealed by the Statute Law Revision Act 1927 (17 & 18 Geo. 5. c. 42), which came into force on 22 December 1927.

Section 6, and parts of section 5 and the first schedule, were repealed by part II of schedule 2 to the Slaughter of Animals (Amendment) Act 1954 (2 & 3 Eliz. 2. c. 59).

Section 4 was repealed by schedule 8 to the Criminal Justice (Scotland) Act 1980 (c. 62).

The penalty prescribed by section 7 was successively substituted by the Criminal Procedure (Scotland) Act 1975 (c. 21) and the Law Reform (Miscellaneous Provisions) (Scotland) Act 1985 (c. 73); it, and the corresponding penalty in section 1(1), were then substituted, with effect from 1 April 1996, by the Criminal Procedure (Consequential Provisions) (Scotland) Act 1995 (c. 40), which substituted a fine not exceeding level 4 on the standard scale for the original penalties. Section 1(3)(b) was separately amended by the Protection of Wild Mammals (Scotland) Act 2002 (asp 6).

With effect from 6 October 2006, the act, except section 7, sections 13(a) to (d), section 14 and section 16, was repealed by section 55(1) of, and paragraph 5 of schedule 2 to, the Animal Health and Welfare (Scotland) Act 2006 (asp 11). The 2006 act's explanatory notes state that its offence of causing unnecessary suffering was previously found in the 1912 act, that its section 23 replaced the offences under section 1(1)(c), section 1A and section 1B of the 1912 act, and that its section 35 replaced and modernised the power to destroy an animal formerly contained in section 10 of the 1912 act.

As a result, only section 7 (poisoned grain and flesh), sections 13(a) to (d) (definitions) and section 14 (extent of act) remain substantively in force, together with section 16 so far as it provides the act's short title.
