= Depredations on the Thames Act 1800 =

Act of the Parliament of Great Britain

- Act of Parliament
- Parliament of Great Britain
- Long title: An Act for the more effectual Prevention of Depredations on the River Thames, and in its Vicinity; and to amend an Act made in the second Year of the Reign of His present Majesty, to prevent the committing of Thefts and Frauds by Persons navigating Bum Boats, and other Boats upon the River Thames.
- Citation: 39 & 40 Geo. 3. c. 87
- Territorial extent: Great Britain

Dates
- Royal assent: 28 July 1800
- Commencement: 28 July 1800 (Note: The Acts of Parliament (Commencement) Act 1793.)
- Expired: 25 March 1807
- Repealed: 21 August 1871
Other legislation
Amends	Thefts upon the Thames Act 1762
Amended by	Depredations on the Thames Act 1807; Depredations on the Thames Act 1814; Police Magistrates Metropolitan Act 1822; Police Magistrates, Metropolis Act 1833; Justices of the Peace in Metropolis Act 1837
Repealed by	Statute Law Revision Act 1871

Status: Repealed

Text of statute as originally enacted

The Depredations on the Thames Act 1800 (39 & 40 Geo. 3. c. 87), sometimes called the Thames Police Act 1800, the Thames River Police Act 1800, the Marine Police Act or the Depredations on the Thames Act 1800, was an act of the Parliament of Great Britain, granted royal assent on 28 July 1800. As alluded to in its long title, it amended the Thefts upon the Thames Act 1762 (2 Geo. 3. c. 28).

Established two years earlier, the Marine Police Force was initially run and funded by the West Indies merchants whose cargoes in the Pool of London it was principally intended to protect. The act converted it to a publicly-run and publicly funded body, increased its establishment to 88 men and set out regulations for how they were now to operate under the Home Secretary's direct supervision, thus laying the groundwork for the Force's absorption into the Metropolitan Police in 1839.

Depredations on the Thames Act 1807
- Act of Parliament
- Parliament of the United Kingdom
- Long title: An Act to continue, until the Twenty-fifth Day of March One thousand eight hundred and fourteen, and amend an Act, made in the Thirty-ninth and Fortieth Year of His present Majesty, for the more effectual Prevention of Depredations on the River Thames and its Vicinity; and to amend an Act made in the Second Year of His present Majesty, to prevent the committing of Thefts and Frauds by Persons navigating Bum Boats, and other Boats, upon the River Thames.
- Citation: 47 Geo. 3 Sess. 1. c. 37
- Territorial extent: United Kingdom

Dates
- Royal assent: 25 March 1807
- Commencement: 25 March 1807
- Expired: 25 March 1814 (Note: Section 1.)
- Repealed: 10 August 1872
Other legislation
Amends	Depredations on the Thames Act 1800; Metropolitan Police Magistrates Act 1802
Amended by	Depredations on the Thames Act 1814
Repealed by	Statute Law Revision Act 1872 (No. 2)

Status: Repealed

Text of statute as originally enacted

Depredations on the Thames Act 1814
- Act of Parliament
- Parliament of the United Kingdom
- Long title: An Act to revive and continue, until the First Day of June One thousand eight hundred and twenty and to amend several Acts for the more effectual Prevention of Depredations on the River Thames, and its Vicinity.
- Citation: 54 Geo. 3. c. 187
- Territorial extent: United Kingdom

Dates
- Royal assent: 30 July 1814
- Commencement: 25 March 1814
- Expired: 1 June 1820
- Repealed: 1 July 1821
Other legislation
Amends	Depredations on the Thames Act 1800; Depredations on the Thames Act 1807
Repealed by	Police Magistrates, Metropolitan Act 1821

Status: Repealed

Text of statute as originally enacted

The act was amended and renewed by the Depredations on the Thames Act 1807 (47 Geo. 3 Sess. 1. c. 37), the Depredations on the Thames Act 1814 (54 Geo. 3. c. 187), the Police Magistrates Metropolitan Act 1822 (1 Geo. 4. c. 66), the Police Magistrates, Metropolis Act 1833 (3 & 4 Will. 4. c. 19) and finally the Justices of the Peace in Metropolis Act 1837 (7 Will. 4 & 1 Vict. c. 37). The Marine Police were finally absorbed into the Metropolitan Police via the Metropolitan Police Act 1839 (2 & 3 Vict. c. 47).

== Subsequent developments ==
The whole act was repealed by section 1 of, and the schedule to, the Statute Law Revision Act 1871 (34 & 35 Vict. c. 116), which came into force on 21 August 1871.
