= Cruel Treatment of Cattle Act 1822 =

Act of the Parliament of the United Kingdom

- Act of Parliament
- Parliament of the United Kingdom
- Long title: An Act to prevent the cruel and improper Treatment of Cattle.
- Citation: 3 Geo. 4. c. 71
- Territorial extent: United Kingdom

Dates
- Royal assent: 22 July 1822
- Commencement: 22 July 1822 (Note: The Acts of Parliament (Commencement) Act 1793.)
- Repealed: 9 September 1835
Other legislation
Repealed by	Cruelty to Animals Act 1835
Relates to	Cruelty to Animals Act 1849

Status: Repealed

Text of statute as originally enacted

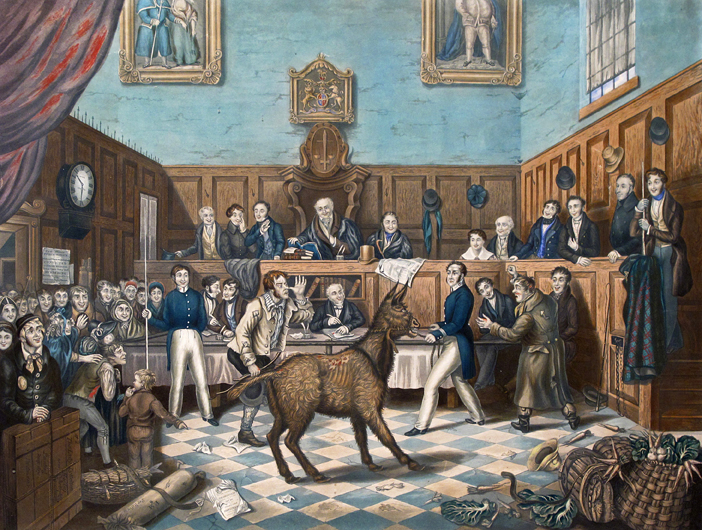
A painting of the trial of Bill Burns, the world's first known conviction for animal cruelty under the 1822 Martin's Act, after Burns was found beating his donkey. The prosecution was brought by Richard Martin, also known as "Humanity Dick", and the case became memorable because he brought the donkey into court.

The Cruel Treatment of Cattle Act 1822 (3 Geo. 4. c. 71) was an act of the Parliament of the United Kingdom with the long title "An Act to prevent the cruel and improper Treatment of Cattle"; it is sometimes known as Martin's Act, after the MP and animal welfare campaigner Richard Martin. It is the first known piece of animal welfare legislation in the world.

The act listed "ox, cow, heifer, steer, sheep, or other cattle". This was held not to include bulls. Section 2 of the Cruelty to Animals Act 1835 (5 & 6 Will. 4. c. 59) extended the wording of this act to remedy the issue.

== Subsequent developments ==
The act was repealed by section 1 of the Cruelty to Animals Act 1835 (5 & 6 Will. 4. c. 59), which came into force on 9 September 1835.

== See also ==
- Animal welfare in the United Kingdom
