= Thefts upon the Thames Act 1762 =

Act of the Parliament of Great Britain

- Act of Parliament
- Parliament of Great Britain
- Long title: An act to prevent the committing of thefts and frauds by persons navigating bum boats, and other boats, upon the river Thames.
- Citation: 2 Geo. 3. c. 28
- Territorial extent: Great Britain

Dates
- Royal assent: 2 June 1762
- Commencement: 24 June 1762 (Note: Section 1.)
- Repealed: 17 August 1839
Other legislation
Amended by	Depredations on the Thames Act 1800
Repealed by	Metropolitan Police Act 1839

Status: Repealed

Text of statute as originally enacted

The Thefts upon the Thames Act 1762 (2 Geo. 3. c. 28) was an act of the Parliament of Great Britain, granted royal assent on 2 June 1762. It aimed to discourage theft of cargo and tackle from ships on the River Thames and came to be nicknamed the 'Bumboat Act' for requiring all such light vessels (used for unloading larger ships' cargoes to wharves and for meeting new ships to resupply their crews and clear their full bilges) to be registered with Trinity House.

The act also allowed suspect boats to be stopped and searched and any items suspected to be stolen to be seized, as well as putting in place punishments for thieves and those suspected of involvement of thefts.

== Subsequent developments ==
The act proved ineffectual and was superseded by the formation of the Marine Police Force in 1798 and its switch to being a state-funded body thanks to the Depredations on the Thames Act 1800 (39 & 40 Geo. 3. c. 87), which amended the 1762 act.

The whole act was repealed by section 24 of the Metropolitan Police Act 1839 (2 & 3 Vict. c. 47), which came into force on 17 August 1839.
