= Cruelty to Animals Act 1835 =

Act of the Parliament of the United Kingdom

- Act of Parliament
- Parliament of the United Kingdom
- Long title: An Act to Consolidate and Amend the Several Laws Relating to the Cruel and Improper Treatment of Animals, and the Mischiefs Arising from the Driving of Cattle, and to Make Other Provisions in Regard Thereto.
- Citation: 5 & 6 Will. 4. c. 59
- Territorial extent: United Kingdom

Dates
- Royal assent: 9 September 1835
- Commencement: 9 September 1835 (Note: The Acts of Parliament (Commencement) Act 1793.)
- Repealed: 1 August 1849
Other legislation
Amends	Police Magistrates, Metropolis Act 1833
Repeals/revokes	Cruel Treatment of Cattle Act 1822
Amended by	Cruelty to Animals (Ireland) Act 1837
Repealed by	Cruelty to Animals Act 1849

Status: Repealed

Text of statute as originally enacted

The Cruelty to Animals Act 1835 (5 & 6 Will. 4. c. 59) or the Humane Act 1835, or the Protection of Animals Act 1835, was an act of the Parliament of the United Kingdom, intended to protect animals, and in particular cattle, from mistreatment. Its long title is "An Act to Consolidate and Amend the Several Laws Relating to the Cruel and Improper Treatment of Animals, and the Mischiefs Arising from the Driving of Cattle, and to Make Other Provisions in Regard Thereto."

== Passage ==
The act was introduced as a bill by the member of parliament for South Durham, Joseph Pease, who was a Quaker and a member of the committee of the Society for the Prevention of Cruelty to Animals. The law was passed in part due to lobbying by the society (founded 1824, since 1840 the RSPCA). The act was repealed and replaced by the Cruelty to Animals Act 1849 (12 & 13 Vict. c. 92).

== Provisions ==
=== Animal baiting ===
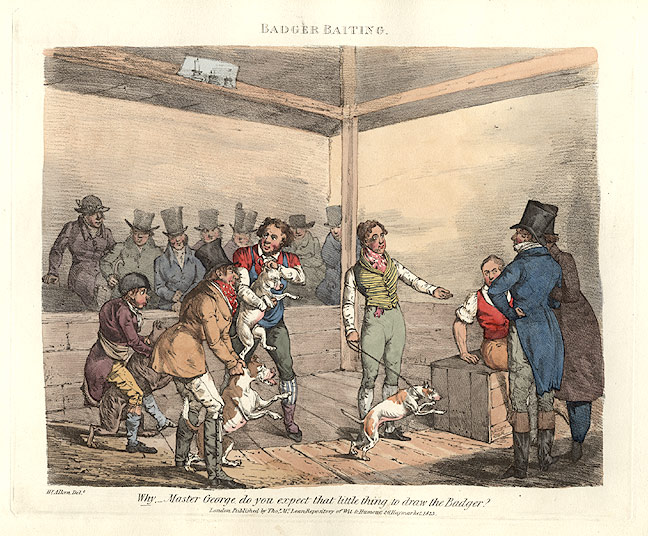
Cartoon representation of badger-baiting in London from c. 1823. The act outlawed any kind of animal baiting but did not entirely succeed in eradicating the practise.

The British legal action to protect animals began with the passing of the Cruel Treatment of Cattle Act 1822 (3 Geo. 4. c. 71) to prevent cruel and improper treatment of cattle. The act amended the existing legislation to prohibit the keeping of premises for the purpose of staging the baiting of bulls, dogs, bears, badgers or "other Animal (whether of domestic or wild Nature or Kind)", which facilitated further legislation to protect animals, create shelters, veterinary hospitals and more humane transportation and slaughter. The act also banned (but failed to eradicate) dog fighting and cockfighting.

By the 18th century bear-baiting had largely died out in Britain, with the cost of importing bears for blood sports prohibitively high, but bull-baiting remained popular and dog fighting and cockfighting were common. At the time of the act, the "bull stone" of Leslie, Fife was first recorded in the New Statistical Account of Scotland as an item which had already fallen out of use. It is a large stone to which bulls and occasionally bears were tied before being baited.

=== Repealed enactments ===
Section 1 of the act repealed 2 enactments, listed in that section.

Citation	Short title	Description	Extent of repeal
3 Geo. 4. c. 71	Cruel Treatment of Cattle Act 1822	An Act to prevent the cruel and improper Treatment of Cattle.	The whole act.
3 & 4 Will. 4. c. 19	Police Magistrates, Metropolis Act 1833	An Act for the more effectual Administration of Justice in the Office of a Justice of the Peace in the several Police Offices established in the Metropolis, and for the more effectual Prevention of Depredations on the River Thames and its Vicinity, for Three Years.	So much of the act as related to the keeping or using of any premises or place, within five miles of Temple Bar, for the purpose of bear-baiting, cock-fighting, or badger-baiting.

== Subsequent developments ==
The act was extended to Ireland by the Cruelty to Animals (Ireland) Act 1837 (7 Will. 4 & 1 Vict. c. 66).

The whole act was repealed by section 1 of the Cruelty to Animals Act 1849 (12 & 13 Vict. c. 92), which came into force on 1 August 1849.

== See also ==
- Animal welfare in the United Kingdom
