= Conveyance of Prisoners (Ireland) Act 1837 =

Act of the Parliament of the United Kingdom

- Act of Parliament
- Parliament of the United Kingdom
- Long title: An Act to regulate the Expences of conveying Prisoners in Ireland.
- Citation: 1 & 2 Vict. c. 6
- Territorial extent: United Kingdom

Dates
- Royal assent: 23 December 1837
- Commencement: 23 December 1837 (Note: The Acts of Parliament (Commencement) Act 1793.)
- Repealed: 24 August 1839
Other legislation
Repealed by	Constabulary (Ireland) Act 1839

Status: Repealed

Text of statute as originally enacted

The Conveyance of Prisoners (Ireland) Act 1837 (1 & 2 Vict. c. 6) was an act of the Parliament of the United Kingdom, signed into law on 23 December 1837. It directed that the expenses of conveying prisoners were to be paid by the paymaster of the appropriate constabulary force, and then repaid by grand jury presentment.

== Subsequent developments ==
The whole act was repealed by section 29 of the Constabulary (Ireland) Act 1839 (23 & 24 Vict. c. 75), which came into force on 24 August 1839.
