= Police Magistrates, Metropolis Act 1833 =

Act of the Parliament of the United Kingdom

- Act of Parliament
- Parliament of the United Kingdom
- Long title: An Act for the more effectual Administration of Justice in the Office of a Justice of the Peace in the several Police Offices established in the Metropolis, and for the more effectual Prevention of Depredations on the River Thames and its Vicinity, for Three Years.
- Citation: 3 & 4 Will. 4. c. 19
- Territorial extent: United Kingdom

Dates
- Royal assent: 18 June 1833
- Commencement: 19 June 1833 (Note: Section 54.)
- Expired: 1 July 1836
- Repealed: 25 August 1839
Other legislation
Amends	Justices of the Peace, Metropolis Act 1829
Repeals/revokes	Police Magistrates, Metropolis Act 1822; Justice of the Peace, Metropolis Act 1825
Amended by	Cruelty to Animals Act 1835; Justices of the Peace in Metropolis Act 1837
Repealed by	Metropolitan Police Courts Act 1839

Status: Repealed

Text of statute as originally enacted

The Police Magistrates, Metropolis Act 1833 (3 & 4 Will. 4. c. 19) was an act of the Parliament of the United Kingdom, granted royal assent on 18 June 1833. It continued the police offices set up in 1792, particularly that at Wapping, laying the ground for that court and the River Police's incorporation into the new Metropolitan Police as Thames Division in 1839 and the evolution of the police offices into police courts and later magistrates courts.

The act expanded the list of offences concerning animal welfare to include bear-baiting, badger-fighting and cock-fighting.

== Subsequent developments ==
Justices of the Peace in Metropolis Act 1837
- Act of Parliament
- Parliament of the United Kingdom
- Long title: An Act to continue until the First Day of July in the Year One thousand eight hundred and thirty-eight, and from thence to the End of the then next Session of Parliament, an Act for the more effectual Administration of the Office of a Justice of the Peace in and near the Metropolis.
- Citation: 7 Will. 4 & 1 Vict. c. 37
- Territorial extent: United Kingdom

Dates
- Royal assent: 12 July 1837
- Commencement: 12 July 1837 (Note: The Acts of Parliament (Commencement) Act 1793.)
- Expired: 1 July 1838 (Note: Section 1.)
- Repealed: 25 August 1839
Other legislation
Amends	Police Magistrates, Metropolis Act 1833
Repealed by	Metropolitan Police Courts Act 1839

Status: Repealed

Text of statute as originally enacted

The act was continued until the end of the next session of parliament after 1 July 1838 by section 1 of the Justices of the Peace in Metropolis Act 1837 (7 Will. 4 & 1 Vict. c. 37).

The whole act was repealed by section 54 of the Metropolitan Police Courts Act 1839 (2 & 3 Vict. c. 71), which came into force on 25 August 1839.
