= List of acts of the Parliament of the United Kingdom from 1837 =

This is a complete list of acts of the Parliament of the United Kingdom for the year 1837.

Note that the first parliament of the United Kingdom was held in 1801; parliaments between 1707 and 1800 were either parliaments of Great Britain or of Ireland). For acts passed up until 1707, see the list of acts of the Parliament of England and the list of acts of the Parliament of Scotland. For acts passed from 1707 to 1800, see the list of acts of the Parliament of Great Britain. See also the list of acts of the Parliament of Ireland.

For acts of the devolved parliaments and assemblies in the United Kingdom, see the list of acts of the Scottish Parliament, the list of acts of the Northern Ireland Assembly, and the list of acts and measures of Senedd Cymru; see also the list of acts of the Parliament of Northern Ireland.

The number shown after each act's title is its chapter number. Acts passed before 1963 are cited using this number, preceded by the year(s) of the reign during which the relevant parliamentary session was held; thus the Union with Ireland Act 1800 is cited as "39 & 40 Geo. 3 c. 67", meaning the 67th act passed during the session that started in the 39th year of the reign of George III and which finished in the 40th year of that reign. Note that the modern convention is to use Arabic numerals in citations (thus "41 Geo. 3" rather than "41 Geo. III"). Acts of the last session of the Parliament of Great Britain and the first session of the Parliament of the United Kingdom are both cited as "41 Geo. 3". Acts passed from 1963 onwards are simply cited by calendar year and chapter number.

All modern acts have a short title, e.g. the Local Government Act 2003. Some earlier acts also have a short title given to them by later acts, such as by the Short Titles Act 1896.

== 7 Will. 4 & 1 Vict. ==
The third session of the 12th Parliament of the United Kingdom, which met from 31 January 1837 until 17 July 1837.

This session was also traditionally cited as 7 Will. 4, 7 Gul. 4, 7 Wm. 4, 7 W. 4, 7 Gul. 4 & 1 Vict., 7 Wm. 4 & 1 Vict., 7 W. 4 & 1 Vict., 7 Will. 4 and 1 Vict. or 1 Vict.

=== Public general acts ===
Short title	Citation	Royal assent
Long title
Registration of Births, etc. Act 1837 (repealed)	7 Will. 4 & 1 Vict. c. 1	24 February 1837
An Act to suspend for a limited Time the Operation of Two Acts (Note: Marriage Act 1836 (6 & 7 Will. 4. c. 85)) (Note: Births and Deaths Registration Act 1836 (6 & 7 Will. 4. c. 86)) passed in the last Session of Parliament, for registering Births, Deaths, and Marriages in England, and for Marriages in England. (Repealed by Statute Law Revision Act 1874 (37 & 38 Vict. c. 35))
Grand Jury (Ireland) Act 1837 (repealed)	7 Will. 4 & 1 Vict. c. 2	24 February 1837
An Act to amend an Act passed in the Seventh Year of His present Majesty, (Note: Grand Jury (Ireland) Act 1836 (6 & 7 Will. 4. c. 116)) for consolidating and amending the Laws relating to the Presentment of Public Money by Grand Juries in Ireland. (Repealed by Coroners (Ireland) Act 1846 (9 & 10 Vict. c. 37), Statute Law Revision Act 1874 (37 & 38 Vict. c. 35), Statute Law Revision (No. 2) Act 1888 (51 & 52 Vict. c. 57), Statute Law Revision (No. 2) Act 1890 (53 & 54 Vict. c. 51), Statute Law Revision Act 1892 (55 & 56 Vict. c. 19), Local Government (Ireland) Act 1898 (61 & 62 Vict. c. 37), Sheriffs (Ireland) Act 1920 (10 & 11 Geo. 5. c. 26), Public Works etc., Loans Act (Northern Ireland) 1953 (c. 13 (N.I.)) and Grand Jury (Abolition) Act (Northern Ireland) 1969 (c. 15 (N.I.)))
Transfer to Admiralty of Postal Contracts Act 1837 (repealed)	7 Will. 4 & 1 Vict. c. 3	18 March 1837
An Act for transferring to the Commissioners of the Admiralty all Contracts, Bonds, and other Securities entered into with the Postmaster General in relation to the Packet Service. (Repealed by Statute Law Revision Act 1874 (37 & 38 Vict. c. 35))
Charities Inquiries Commission Expenses Act 1837 (repealed)	7 Will. 4 & 1 Vict. c. 4	18 March 1837
An Act to continue, until the First Day of July One thousand eight hundred and thirty-seven, the Powers of the Commissioners for inquiring concerning Charities in England and Wales. (Repealed by Statute Law Revision Act 1874 (37 & 38 Vict. c. 35))
Leasing-making, etc. (Scotland) Act 1837 (repealed)	7 Will. 4 & 1 Vict. c. 5	18 March 1837
An Act for amending an Act of His late Majesty, (Note: Leasing-making (Scotland) Act 1825 (6 Geo. 4. c. 47)) for restricting the Punishment of Leasing-making, Sedition, and Blasphemy, in Scotland. (Repealed by Statute Law Revision Act 1874 (37 & 38 Vict. c. 35))
Supply Act 1837 (repealed)	7 Will. 4 & 1 Vict. c. 6	22 March 1837
An Act to apply the Sum of Two Millions to the Service of the Year One thousand eight hundred and thirty-seven. (Repealed by Statute Law Revision Act 1874 (37 & 38 Vict. c. 35))
Mutiny Act 1837 (repealed)	7 Will. 4 & 1 Vict. c. 7	21 April 1837
An Act for punishing Mutiny and Desertion, and for the better Payment of the Army and their Quarters. (Repealed by Statute Law Revision Act 1874 (37 & 38 Vict. c. 35))
Marine Mutiny Act 1837 (repealed)	7 Will. 4 & 1 Vict. c. 8	21 April 1837
An Act for the Regulation of His Majesty's Royal Marine Forces while on Shore. (Repealed by Statute Law Revision Act 1874 (37 & 38 Vict. c. 35))
Mint Act 1837 (repealed)	7 Will. 4 & 1 Vict. c. 9	21 April 1837
An Act to amend several Acts relating to the Royal Mint. (Repealed by Coinage Act 1870 (33 & 34 Vict. c. 10))
Irish and Scotch Paupers Removal Act 1837 (repealed)	7 Will. 4 & 1 Vict. c. 10	21 April 1837
An Act to alter, amend, and continue for a certain Period, an Act (Note: Poor Removal Act 1833 (3 & 4 Will. 4. c. 40)) for repealing certain Acts relating to the Removal of poor Persons born in Scotland and Ireland, and chargeable to Parishes in England, and to make other Provisions in lieu thereof. (Repealed by Poor Removal Act 1845 (8 & 9 Vict. c. 117))
Supply Act 1837 (repealed)	7 Will. 4 & 1 Vict. c. 11	5 May 1837
An Act to apply the Sum of Eight Millions, out of the Consolidated Fund, to the Service of the Year One thousand eight hundred and thirty-seven. (Repealed by Statute Law Revision Act 1874 (37 & 38 Vict. c. 35))
Indemnity Act 1837 (repealed)	7 Will. 4 & 1 Vict. c. 12	8 June 1837
An Act to indemnify such Persons in the United Kingdom as have omitted to qualify themselves for Offices and Employments, and for extending the Time limited for those Purposes respectively until the Twenty-fifth Day of March One thousand eight hundred and thirty-eight; and for the Relief of Clerks to Attorneys and Solicitors in certain Cases. (Repealed by Promissory Oaths Act 1871 (34 & 35 Vict. c. 48))
Millbank Penitentiary Act 1837 (repealed)	7 Will. 4 & 1 Vict. c. 13	8 June 1837
An Act to amend the Acts for regulating the General Penitentiary at Millbank. (Repealed by Millbank Prison Act 1843 (6 & 7 Vict. c. 26))
Jury Trials (Scotland) Act 1837 (repealed)	7 Will. 4 & 1 Vict. c. 14	8 June 1837
An Act to explain and amend Two Acts (Note: Jury Trials (Scotland) Act 1815 (55 Geo. 3. c. 42)) (Note: Jury Trials (Scotland) Act 1819 (59 Geo. 3. c. 35)) relating to Trial by Jury in Scotland. (Repealed by Court of Session Act 1988 (c. 36))
Trent and Markham Bridges Act 1837 (repealed)	7 Will. 4 & 1 Vict. c. 15	8 June 1837
An Act to discharge His Majesty's Manor and Demesne Lands at Newark in the County of Nottingham from any Costs of rebuilding or repairing Trent and Markham Bridges, and to charge the same on the other Hereditary Revenues of the Crown. (Repealed by Statute Law Revision Act 1950 (14 Geo. 6. c. 6))
Exchequer Bills Act 1837 (repealed)	7 Will. 4 & 1 Vict. c. 16	8 June 1837
An Act for raising the Sum of Eleven Millions by Exchequer Bills, for the Service of the Year One thousand eight hundred and thirty-seven. (Repealed by Statute Law Revision Act 1874 (37 & 38 Vict. c. 35))
Land Tax Redemption Act 1837 (Note: This was the last public act of the reign of King William IV.) (repealed)	7 Will. 4 & 1 Vict. c. 17	10 June 1837
An Act for carrying to the Consolidated Fund certain Monies paid into the Exchequer, and usually applied as a Part of the annual Aids and Supplies; and for cancelling Stock transferred to the Commissioners for the Reduction of the National Debt on account of the Redemption of Land Tax. (Repealed by Statute Law Revision Act 1874 (37 & 38 Vict. c. 35))
Turnpike Acts Continuance Act 1837 (repealed)	7 Will. 4 & 1 Vict. c. 18 (Note: This was the first public act of the reign of Queen Victoria.)	30 June 1837
An Act for continuing until the First Day of June One thousand eight hundred and thirty-nine, and to the End of the then Session of Parliament, the several Acts for regulating the Turnpike Roads in Great Britain which will expire with the present or with the next Session of Parliament. (Repealed by Statute Law Revision Act 1874 (37 & 38 Vict. c. 35))
Recorders' Courts of Quarter Sessions Act 1837 (repealed)	7 Will. 4 & 1 Vict. c. 19	30 June 1837
An Act to empower the Recorder or other Person presiding in Quarter Sessions in Corporate Cities and Towns, and Justices of the Peace for Counties, Ridings, or Divisions, to divide their respective Courts in certain Cases. (Repealed by Statute Law Revision (No. 2) Act 1888 (51 & 52 Vict. c. 57))
Royal Military Canal Act 1837	7 Will. 4 & 1 Vict. c. 20	30 June 1837
An Act for transferring and vesting the Royal Military Canal, Roads, Towing Paths, and the Ramparts and other Works belonging thereto, and all Estates and Property taken and occupied for the same, in the Counties of Kent and Sussex, and also the Rates and Tolls arising therefrom, in the principal Officers of His Majesty's Ordnance.
Public Works (Ireland) Act 1837 (repealed)	7 Will. 4 & 1 Vict. c. 21	30 June 1837
An Act to amend the Acts for the Extension and Promotion of Public Works in Ireland. (Repealed by Statute Law Revision Act 1874 (37 & 38 Vict. c. 35), Statute Law Revision (No. 2) Act 1888 (51 & 52 Vict. c. 57), Statute Law Revision (No. 2) Act 1890 (53 & 54 Vict. c. 51) and Public Works etc., Loans Act (Northern Ireland) 1953 (c. 13 (N.I.)))
Births and Deaths Registration Act 1837 (repealed)	7 Will. 4 & 1 Vict. c. 22	30 June 1837
An Act to explain and amend Two Acts passed in the last Session of Parliament, for Marriages, and for registering Births, Deaths, and Marriages, in England. (Repealed by Births and Deaths Registration Act 1874 (37 & 38 Vict. c. 88), Statute Law Revision Act 1874 (37 & 38 Vict. c. 35), Local Government Act 1929 (19 & 20 Geo. 5. c. 17), Marriage Act 1949 (12, 13 & 14 Geo. 6. c. 76), Births and Deaths Registration Act 1953 (1 & 2 Eliz. 2. c. 20) and Registration Service Act 1953 (1 & 2 Eliz. 2. c. 37))
Pillory Abolition Act 1837 (repealed)	7 Will. 4 & 1 Vict. c. 23	30 June 1837
An Act to abolish the Punishment of the Pillory. (Repealed by Statute Law Revision (No. 2) Act 1888 (51 & 52 Vict. c. 57))
County Buildings Act 1837 (repealed)	7 Will. 4 & 1 Vict. c. 24	30 June 1837
An Act to explain and amend an Act of the Seventh Year of His Majesty King George the Fourth, (Note: County Buildings Act 1826 (7 Geo. 4. c. 63)) to provide for improving and rebuilding Shire Halls, County Halls, and other Buildings for holding the Assizes and Grand Sessions, and also Judges Lodgings, throughout England and Wales. (Repealed by Courts Act 1971 (c. 23))
Dublin Police Act 1837 (repealed)	7 Will. 4 & 1 Vict. c. 25	3 July 1837
An Act to make more effectual Provisions relating to the Police in the District of Dublin Metropolis. (Repealed by Statute Law (Repeals) Act 1993 (c. 50))
Wills Act 1837	7 Will. 4 & 1 Vict. c. 26	3 July 1837
An Act for the Amendment of the Laws with respect to Wills.
Sugar Duties Act 1837 (repealed)	7 Will. 4 & 1 Vict. c. 27	3 July 1837
An Act for granting to Her Majesty, until the Fifth Day of July One thousand eight hundred and thirty-eight, certain Duties on Sugar imported into the United Kingdom, for the Service of the Year One thousand eight hundred and thirty-seven. (Repealed by Statute Law Revision Act 1874 (37 & 38 Vict. c. 35))
Real Property Limitation Act 1837 (repealed)	7 Will. 4 & 1 Vict. c. 28	3 July 1837
An Act to amend an Act of the Third and Fourth Years of His late Majesty, (Note: Real Property Limitation Act 1833 (3 & 4 Will. 4. c. 27)) for the Limitation of Actions and Suits relating to Real Property, and for simplifying the Remedies for trying the Rights thereto. (Repealed for England and Wales by Limitation Act 1939 (2 & 3 Geo. 6. c. 21) and for Northern Ireland by Statute of Limitations Act (Northern Ireland) 1958 (c. 10 (N.I.)))
Enlistment of Foreigners Act 1837 (repealed)	7 Will. 4 & 1 Vict. c. 29	12 July 1837
An Act for enabling Her Majesty to grant the Rank of General Officers to Foreigners now bearing Her Majesty's Commission, and to permit the Enlistment of Foreigners under certain Restrictions. (Repealed by Regulation of the Forces Act 1881 (44 & 45 Vict. c. 57))
Superior Courts (Officers) Act 1837 (repealed)	7 Will. 4 & 1 Vict. c. 30	12 July 1837
An Act to abolish certain Offices in the Superior Courts of Common Law, and to make Provision for a more effective and uniform Establishment of Officers in those Courts. (Repealed by Supreme Court of Judicature (Consolidation) Act 1925 (15 & 16 Geo. 5. c. 49))
Demise of the Crown Act 1837 (repealed)	7 Will. 4 & 1 Vict. c. 31	12 July 1837
An Act for Continuing Military Commissions and Commissions in the Royal Marines in force notwithstanding the Demise of the Crown. (Repealed by Statute Law (Repeals) Act 1973 (c. 39))
Post Office (Repeal of Laws) Act 1837 (repealed)	7 Will. 4 & 1 Vict. c. 32	12 July 1837
An Act to repeal the several Laws relating to the Post Office. (Repealed by Post Office Act 1908 (8 Edw. 7. c. 48))
Post Office (Management) Act 1837 (repealed)	7 Will. 4 & 1 Vict. c. 33	12 July 1837
An Act for the Management of the Post Office. (Repealed by Post Office Act 1908 (8 Edw. 7. c. 48))
Postage Act 1837 (repealed)	7 Will. 4 & 1 Vict. c. 34	12 July 1837
An Act for the Regulation of the Duties of Postage. (Repealed by Post Office (Duties) Act 1840 (3 & 4 Vict. c. 96))
Postage Act 1837 (repealed)	7 Will. 4 & 1 Vict. c. 35	12 July 1837
An Act for regulating the sending and receiving of Letters and Packets by the Post free from the Duty of Postage. (Repealed by Post Office (Duties) Act 1840 (3 & 4 Vict. c. 96))
Post Office (Offences) Act 1837 (repealed)	7 Will. 4 & 1 Vict. c. 36	12 July 1837
An Act for consolidating the Laws relative to Offences against the Post Office of the United Kingdom, and for regulating the judicial Administration of the Post Office Laws, and for explaining certain Terms and Expressions employed in those Laws. (Repealed by Post Office Act 1908 (8 Edw. 7. c. 48))
Justices of the Peace in Metropolis Act 1837 (repealed)	7 Will. 4 & 1 Vict. c. 37	12 July 1837
An Act to continue until the First Day of July in the Year One thousand eight hundred and thirty-eight, and from thence to the End of the then next Session of Parliament, an Act for the more effectual Administration of the Office of a Justice of the Peace in and near the Metropolis. (Repealed by Metropolitan Police Courts Act 1839 (2 & 3 Vict. c. 71))
Exchequer Bills (No. 2) Act 1837 (repealed)	7 Will. 4 & 1 Vict. c. 38	12 July 1837
An Act for raising the Sum of Thirteen millions six hundred and twenty-three thousand three hundred Pounds by Exchequer Bills, for the Service of the Year One thousand eight hundred and thirty-seven. (Repealed by Statute Law Revision Act 1874 (37 & 38 Vict. c. 35))
Interpretation of Terms Act 1837 (repealed)	7 Will. 4 & 1 Vict. c. 39	12 July 1837
An Act to interpret the Words "Sheriff," "Sheriff Clerk," "Shire," "Sheriffdom," and "County," occurring in Acts of Parliament relating to Scotland. (Repealed by Interpretation Act 1889 (52 & 53 Vict. c. 63))
Payment of Creditors (Scotland) Act 1837 (repealed)	7 Will. 4 & 1 Vict. c. 40	12 July 1837
An Act to continue an Act of the Fifty-fourth Year of His Majesty King George the Third, (Note: Payment of Creditors (Scotland) Act 1814 (54 Geo. 3. c. 137)) for rendering the Payment of Creditors more equal and expeditious in Scotland, until the First Day of May One thousand eight hundred and thirty-eight, and from thence to the End of the then next Session of Parliament. (Repealed by Statute Law Revision Act 1874 (37 & 38 Vict. c. 35))
Small Debt (Scotland) Act 1837 (repealed)	7 Will. 4 & 1 Vict. c. 41	12 July 1837
An Act for the more effectual Recovery of Small Debts in the Sheriff Courts, and for regulating the Establishment of Circuit Courts for the Trial of Small Debt Causes by the Sheriffs, in Scotland. (Repealed by Sheriff Courts (Scotland) Act 1971 (c. 58))
New South Wales, etc., Government Act 1837 (repealed)	7 Will. 4 & 1 Vict. c. 42	12 July 1837
An Act to continue until the Thirty-first Day of December One thousand eight hundred and thirty-eight, and from thence to the End of the then next Session of Parliament, an Act of the Ninth Year of His Majesty King George the Fourth, (Note: Australian Courts Act 1828 (9 Geo. 4. c. 83)) for the Administration of Justice in New South Wales and Van Dieman's Land. (Repealed by Statute Law Revision Act 1874 (37 & 38 Vict. c. 35))
Small Debts' Recovery (Ireland) Act 1837 (repealed)	7 Will. 4 & 1 Vict. c. 43	12 July 1837
An Act to amend the Laws for the Recovery of Small Debts by Civil Bill in Ireland. (Repealed by Civil Bill Courts (Ireland) Act 1851 (14 & 15 Vict. c. 57))
Prosecutions for Concealment of Birth Act 1837 (repealed)	7 Will. 4 & 1 Vict. c. 44	12 July 1837
An Act to provide for the Costs of Prosecutions for concealing the Birth of Children by secret burying or otherwise disposing of their Dead Bodies. (Repealed by Statute Law Revision Act 1874 (37 & 38 Vict. c. 35))
Parish Notices Act 1837 (repealed)	7 Will. 4 & 1 Vict. c. 45	12 July 1837
An Act to alter the Mode of giving Notices for the holding of Vestries, of making Proclamations in Cases of Outlawry, and of giving Notices on Sundays with respect to various Matters. (Repealed by Statute Law (Repeals) Act 2004 (c. 14))
Rolls Estate Act 1837	7 Will. 4 & 1 Vict. c. 46	12 July 1837
An Act to vest the Rolls Estate in Her Majesty, and to provide for the future Payment of the Salary of the Master of the Rolls and the Expenses of the Rolls Chapel.
India Officers' Salaries Act 1837 (repealed)	7 Will. 4 & 1 Vict. c. 47	12 July 1837
An Act to repeal the Prohibition of the Payment of the Salaries and Allowances of the East India Company's Officers during their Absence from their respective Stations in India. (Repealed by Government of India Act 1915 (5 & 6 Geo. 5. c. 61))
Bankruptcy (Ireland) Act 1837 (repealed)	7 Will. 4 & 1 Vict. c. 48	12 July 1837
An Act to appoint a Second Commissioner of Bankrupt in Ireland; and to amend an Act passed in the Sixth and Seventh Years of the Reign of His late Majesty King William the Fourth, (Note: Bankruptcy (Ireland) Act 1836 (6 & 7 Will. 4. c. 14)) intituled "An Act to amend the Laws relating to Bankrupts in Ireland." (Repealed by Irish Bankrupt and Insolvent Act 1857 (20 & 21 Vict. c. 60))
Malt Duties Act 1837 (repealed)	7 Will. 4 & 1 Vict. c. 49	12 July 1837
An Act to amend certain Laws of Excise relating to the Duties on Malt made in the United Kingdom. (Repealed by Inland Revenue Act 1880 (43 & 44 Vict. c. 20))
Union and Parish Property Act 1837 (repealed)	7 Will. 4 & 1 Vict. c. 50	15 July 1837
An Act to facilitate the Conveyance of Lands and Buildings for the Purposes of Two Acts passed respectively in the Fifth and Sixth (Note: Poor Law Amendment Act 1834 (4 & 5 Will. 4. c. 76)) (Note: Union and Parish Property Act 1835 (5 & 6 Will. 4. c. 69)) Years of His late Majesty King William the Fourth. (Repealed by Poor Law Act 1927 (17 & 18 Geo. 5. c. 14))
Advances for Public Works Act 1837 (repealed)	7 Will. 4 & 1 Vict. c. 51	15 July 1837
An Act to authorize a further Issue of Exchequer Bills for Public Works and Fisheries and Employment of the Poor, and to amend the Acts relating thereto. (Repealed by Public Works Loans Act 1875 (38 & 39 Vict. c. 89))
Militia Ballots Suspension Act 1837 (repealed)	7 Will. 4 & 1 Vict. c. 52	15 July 1837
An Act to suspend to the End of the next Session of Parliament the making of Lists and the Ballots and Enrolments for the Militia of the United Kingdom. (Repealed by Statute Law Revision Act 1874 (37 & 38 Vict. c. 35))
Liberty of Ely Act 1837 (repealed)	7 Will. 4 & 1 Vict. c. 53	15 July 1837
An Act to explain and amend an Act of the Sixth and Seventh Years of His late Majesty, (Note: Liberties Act 1836 (6 & 7 Will. 4. c. 87)) for extinguishing the Secular Jurisdiction of the Archbishop of York and the Bishop of Ely in certain Liberties in the Counties of York, Nottingham, and Cambridge. (Repealed by Statute Law (Repeals) Act 1975 (c. 10))
County Treasurers (Ireland) Act 1837 (repealed)	7 Will. 4 & 1 Vict. c. 54	15 July 1837
An Act to provide more effectual Means to make Treasurers of Counties and Counties of Cities in Ireland account for public Monies, and to secure the same. (Repealed by Statute Law Revision Act 1874 (37 & 38 Vict. c. 35), Statute Law Revision Act 1892 (55 & 56 Vict. c. 19) and Local Government (Ireland) Act 1898 (61 & 62 Vict. c. 37))
Sheriff's Fees Act 1837 (repealed)	7 Will. 4 & 1 Vict. c. 55	15 July 1837
An Act for better regulating the Fees payable to Sheriffs upon the Execution of Civil Process. (Repealed by Sheriffs Act 1887 (50 & 51 Vict. c. 55))
Solicitors Act 1837 (repealed)	7 Will. 4 & 1 Vict. c. 56	15 July 1837
An Act for amending the several Acts for the Regulation of Attorneys and Solicitors. (Repealed by Statute Law Revision Act 1874 (37 & 38 Vict. c. 35))
Duties on Beetroot Sugar Act 1837 (repealed)	7 Will. 4 & 1 Vict. c. 57	15 July 1837
An Act to impose certain Duties of Excise on Sugar made from Beet Root in the United Kingdom. (Repealed by Customs and Inland Revenue Act 1874 (37 & 38 Vict. c. 16))
Tithe Composition (Ireland) Act 1837 (repealed)	7 Will. 4 & 1 Vict. c. 58	15 July 1837
An Act to revive and continue, until the Sixth Day of April One thousand eight hundred and thirty-eight, an Act of the last Session of Parliament, for suspending Proceedings for recovering Payment of the Money advanced under the Acts for establishing Tithe Compositions in Ireland. (Repealed by Statute Law Revision Act 1874 (37 & 38 Vict. c. 35))
Bank of Ireland Advances Act 1837 (repealed)	7 Will. 4 & 1 Vict. c. 59	15 July 1837
An Act to postpone until the First Day of January One thousand eight hundred and thirty-nine the Repayment of certain Sums advanced by the Bank of Ireland for the Public Service. (Repealed by Statute Law Revision Act 1870 (33 & 34 Vict. c. 69))
Acts of Parliament (Mistaken References) Act 1837 (repealed)	7 Will. 4 & 1 Vict. c. 60	15 July 1837
An Act for correcting mistaken References to His late Majesty in Acts of this Session of Parliament. (Repealed by Statute Law Revision Act 1950 (14 Geo. 6. c. 6))
Assessed Taxes Act 1837 (repealed)	7 Will. 4 & 1 Vict. c. 61	15 July 1837
An Act to extend an Exemption granted by an Act of the last Session of Parliament (Note: Game Laws (England) Local Taxes, etc. (Scotland) Act 1836 (6 & 7 Will. 4. c. 65)) from the Duties of Assessed Taxes, in respect of certain Carriages with less than Four Wheels, and to amend the Laws relating to the said Duties. (Repealed by Statute Law Revision Act 1874 (37 & 38 Vict. c. 35) and Taxes Management Act 1880 (43 & 44 Vict. c. 19))
Slave Trade Act 1837 (repealed)	7 Will. 4 & 1 Vict. c. 62	15 July 1837
An Act to authorize Her Majesty, until Six Months after the Commencement of the next Session of Parliament, to carry into immediate Execution, by Orders in Council, any Treaties, Conventions, or Stipulations made with any Foreign Power or State for the Suppression of the Slave Trade. (Repealed by Slave Trade Act 1873 (36 & 37 Vict. c. 88))
Militia Pay Act 1837 (repealed)	7 Will. 4 & 1 Vict. c. 63	15 July 1837
An Act to defray the Charge of the Pay, Clothing, and contingent and other Expenses of the Disembodied Militia in Great Britain and Ireland; and to grant Allowances in certain Cases to Subaltern Officers, Adjutants, Paymasters, Quartermasters, Surgeons, Assistant Surgeons, Surgeons Mates, and Serjeant Majors of the Militia, until the First Day of July One thousand eight hundred and thirty-eight. (Repealed by Statute Law Revision Act 1874 (37 & 38 Vict. c. 35))
County of Durham Coroners Act 1837 (repealed)	7 Will. 4 & 1 Vict. c. 64	15 July 1837
An Act for regulating the Coroners of the County of Durham. (Repealed by Coroners Act 1887 (50 & 51 Vict. c. 71))
Exchequer Court (Scotland) Act 1837 (repealed)	7 Will. 4 & 1 Vict. c. 65	15 July 1837
An Act to render valid certain Acts done in the Performance of Duties in the Court of Exchequer in Scotland by the Lord Ordinary on the Bills in the Court of Session, and for the better Regulation of the said Court of Exchequer. (Repealed by Statute Law Revision Act 1874 (37 & 38 Vict. c. 35))
Cruelty to Animals (Ireland) Act 1837 (repealed)	7 Will. 4 & 1 Vict. c. 66	15 July 1837
An Act to extend to Ireland the Act of the Fifth and Sixth Years of His late Majesty's Reign (Note: Cruelty to Animals Act 1835 (5 & 6 Will. 4. c. 59)) consolidating and amending the Laws relating to the cruel and improper Treatment of Animals. (Repealed by Cruelty to Animals Act 1849 (12 & 13 Vict. c. 92))
Master and Workmen (Arbitration) Act 1837 (repealed)	7 Will. 4 & 1 Vict. c. 67	15 July 1837
An Act to amend an Act of the Fifth Year of His Majesty King George the Fourth, (Note: Masters and Workmen Arbitration Act 1824 (5 Geo. 4. c. 96)) for consolidating and amending the Laws relative to the Arbitration of Disputes between Masters and Workmen. (Repealed by Statute Law Revision Act 1950 (14 Geo. 6. c. 6))
Coroners' Inquests Expenses Act 1837 (repealed)	7 Will. 4 & 1 Vict. c. 68	15 July 1837
An Act to provide for Payment of the Expenses of holding Coroners Inquests. (Repealed by Coroners Act 1887 (50 & 51 Vict. c. 71))
Tithe Act 1837 (repealed)	7 Will. 4 & 1 Vict. c. 69	15 July 1837
An Act to amend an Act (Note: Tithe Act 1836 (6 & 7 Will. 4. c. 71)) for the Commutation of Tithes in England and Wales. (Repealed by Statute Law Revision Act 1874 (37 & 38 Vict. c. 35), Statute Law Revision Act 1891 (54 & 55 Vict. c. 67), Tithe Act 1936 (26 Geo. 5 & 1 Edw. 8. c. 43) and Statute Law Revision Act 1953 (2 & 3 Eliz. 2. c. 5))
Civil Service, India Act 1837 (repealed)	7 Will. 4 & 1 Vict. c. 70	15 July 1837
An Act to authorize the Commissioners for the Affairs of India and the Court of Directors of the East India Company to suspend the subsisting Enactments concerning the Fourfold System of Nomination of Candidates for the East India Company's College at Haileybury, and for providing during such Suspension for the Examination of Candidates for the said College. (Repealed by Statute Law Revision Act 1874 (37 & 38 Vict. c. 35))
Suspension of Certain Appointments Act 1837 (repealed)	7 Will. 4 & 1 Vict. c. 71	15 July 1837
An Act to continue until the First Day of August One thousand eight hundred and thirty-eight, and to the End of the then Session of Parliament, Two Acts of the last Session of Parliament, (Note: Ecclesiastical Appointments Suspension Act 1836 (6 & 7 Will. 4. c. 67)) (Note: Ecclesiastical Commissioners Act 1836 (6 & 7 Will. 4. c. 77)) for suspending Appointments to certain Dignities and Offices in Cathedrals and Collegiate Churches, and to Sinecure Rectories, and for preventing the immediate Effects on Ecclesiastical Jurisdictions of the Measures in progress for the Alteration of Dioceses. (Repealed by Statute Law Revision Act 1874 (37 & 38 Vict. c. 35))
Lords Justices Act 1837 or the Lord Justices Act 1837 (repealed)	7 Will. 4 & 1 Vict. c. 72	15 July 1837
An Act to provide for the Appointment of Lords Justices in the Case of the next Successor to the Crown being out of the Realm at the Time of the Demise of Her Majesty. (Repealed by Regency Act 1937 (1 Edw. 8 & 1 Geo. 6. c. 16))
Chartered Companies Act 1837 (repealed)	7 Will. 4 & 1 Vict. c. 73	17 July 1837
An Act for better enabling Her Majesty to confer certain Powers and Immunities on trading and other Companies. (Repealed by Statute Law (Repeals) Act 1993 (c. 50))
Municipal Corporations (Ireland) Act 1837 (repealed)	7 Will. 4 & 1 Vict. c. 74	17 July 1837
An Act to restrain the Alienation of Corporate Property in certain Towns in Ireland. (Repealed by Statute Law Revision Act 1874 (37 & 38 Vict. c. 35))
Church Building Act 1837 (repealed)	7 Will. 4 & 1 Vict. c. 75	17 July 1837
An Act to prolong for Ten Years Her Majesty's Commission for building new Churches. (Repealed by Statute Law Revision Act 1874 (37 & 38 Vict. c. 35))
Post Office Act 1837 (repealed)	7 Will. 4 & 1 Vict. c. 76	17 July 1837
An Act to impose Rates of Packet Postage on East India Letters, and to amend certain Acts relating to the Post Office. (Repealed by Statute Law Revision Act 1874 (37 & 38 Vict. c. 35))
Central Criminal Court Act 1837 (repealed)	7 Will. 4 & 1 Vict. c. 77	17 July 1837
An Act to assimilate the Practice of the Central Criminal Court to other Courts of Criminal Judicature within the Kingdom of England and Wales, with respect to Offenders liable to the Punishment of Death. (Repealed by Courts Act 1971 (c. 23))
Municipal Corporations (England) Act 1837 (repealed)	7 Will. 4 & 1 Vict. c. 78	17 July 1837
An Act to amend an Act (Note: Municipal Corporations Act 1835 (5 & 6 Will. 4. c. 76)) for the Regulation of Municipal Corporations in England and Wales. (Repealed by Municipal Corporations Act 1882 (45 & 46 Vict. c. 50))
Appropriation Act 1837 (repealed)	7 Will. 4 & 1 Vict. c. 79	17 July 1837
An Act to apply the Sum of Five millions two hundred and twenty thousand Pounds out of the Consolidated Fund to the Service of the Year One thousand eight hundred and thirty-seven, and to appropriate the Supplies granted in this Session of Parliament. (Repealed by Statute Law Revision Act 1874 (37 & 38 Vict. c. 35))
Usury Act 1837 (repealed)	7 Will. 4 & 1 Vict. c. 80	17 July 1837
An Act to exempt certain Bills of Exchange and Promissory Notes from the Operation of the Laws relating to Usury. (Repealed by Statute Law Revision Act 1874 (37 & 38 Vict. c. 35))
Municipal Rates Act 1837 (repealed)	7 Will. 4 & 1 Vict. c. 81	17 July 1837
An Act to provide for the levying of Rates in Boroughs and Towns having Municipal Corporations in England and Wales. (Repealed by Municipal Corporations Act 1882 (45 & 46 Vict. c. 50))
County Fermanagh Baronies Act 1837 (repealed)	7 Will. 4 & 1 Vict. c. 82	17 July 1837
An Act to amend the Law relating to Grand Juries in Ireland, so far as to empower the Grand Jury of the County of Fermanagh to reconstruct the Baronial subdivisions of the said County. (Repealed by Statute Law Revision Act 1874 (37 & 38 Vict. c. 35), Statute Law Revision Act 1875 (38 & 39 Vict. c. 66), Statute Law Revision (No. 2) Act 1888 (51 & 52 Vict. c. 57), Statute Law Revision (No. 2) Act 1890 (53 & 54 Vict. c. 51) and Statute Law Revision Act (Northern Ireland) 1954 (c. 35 (N.I.)))
Parliamentary Documents Deposit Act 1837 or the Parliament Documents Deposit Act 1837	7 Will. 4 & 1 Vict. c. 83	17 July 1837
An Act to compel Clerks of the Peace for Counties and other Persons to take the Custody of such Documents as shall be directed to be deposited with them under the Standing Orders of either House of Parliament.
Forgery Act 1837 (repealed)	7 Will. 4 & 1 Vict. c. 84	17 July 1837
An Act to abolish the Punishment of Death in Cases of Forgery. (Repealed by Government Annuities Act 1929 (19 & 20 Geo. 5. c. 29))
Offences against the Person Act 1837 (repealed)	7 Will. 4 & 1 Vict. c. 85	17 July 1837
An Act to amend the Laws relating to Offences against the Person. (Repealed by Criminal Statutes Repeal Act 1861 (24 & 25 Vict. c. 95))
Burglary Act 1837 (repealed)	7 Will. 4 & 1 Vict. c. 86	17 July 1837
An Act to amend the Laws relating to Burglary and Stealing in a Dwelling House. (Repealed by Criminal Statutes Repeal Act 1861 (24 & 25 Vict. c. 95))
Robbery from the Person Act 1837 (repealed)	7 Will. 4 & 1 Vict. c. 87	17 July 1837
An Act to amend the Laws relating to Robbery and Stealing from the Person. (Repealed by Criminal Statutes Repeal Act 1861 (24 & 25 Vict. c. 95))
Piracy Act 1837	7 Will. 4 & 1 Vict. c. 88	17 July 1837
An Act to amend certain Acts relating to the Crime of Piracy.
Burning of Buildings, etc. Act 1837 (repealed)	7 Will. 4 & 1 Vict. c. 89	17 July 1837
An Act to amend the Laws relating to burning or destroying Buildings and Ships. (Repealed by Criminal Statutes Repeal Act 1861 (24 & 25 Vict. c. 95))
Solitary Confinement Act 1837 (repealed)	7 Will. 4 & 1 Vict. c. 90	17 July 1837
An Act to amend the Law relative to Offences punishable by Transportation for Life. (Repealed by Statute Law Revision (No. 2) Act 1893 (56 & 57 Vict. c. 54))
Punishment of Offences Act 1837 (repealed)	7 Will. 4 & 1 Vict. c. 91	17 July 1837
An Act for abolishing the Punishment of Death in certain Cases. (Repealed by Statute Law (Repeals) Act 2008 (c. 12))

=== Local acts ===
Short title	Citation	Royal assent
Long title
Leicester Gaol Act 1837 (repealed)	7 Will. 4 & 1 Vict. c. i	18 March 1837
An Act to enable the Corporation of Leicester to apply the Proceeds of their Real Estates in payment of Money borrowed for the Purchase and Enlargement of the Gaol and House of Correction for the Borough of Leicester. (Repealed by Leicestershire Act 1985 (c. xvii))
Griggs Quay and Penzance Turnpike Road Act 1837	7 Will. 4 & 1 Vict. c. ii	18 March 1837
An Act for maintaining the Causeway and Turnpike Road from Griggs Quay in the Parish of Uly Lelant, over Hayle River and Sands, and through Hayle Foundry, in the County of Cornwall, and for extending the said Turnpike Road from the Western End of the said Causeway towards Penzance.
Worcester County Hall and Courts of Justice Act 1837 (repealed)	7 Will. 4 & 1 Vict. c. iii	22 March 1837
An Act to amend and enlarge the Powers of an Act passed in the First and Second Years of His present Majesty, (Note: Worcester County Hall and Courts of Justice Act 1831 (1 & 2 Will. 4. c. xlviii)) for erecting a County Hall and Courts of Justice, and also for providing Accommodation for His Majesty's Justices of Assize in and for the County of Worcester. (Repealed by Statute Law (Repeals) Act 1998 (c. 43))
Runcorn Gas Act 1837 (repealed)	7 Will. 4 & 1 Vict. c. iv	22 March 1837
An Act for lighting with Gas the Town of Runcorn otherwise called Higher Runcorn and Lower Runcorn, and also the Township or Chapelry of Halton, both in the Parish of Runcorn in the County of Chester. (Repealed by Runcorn Gas Act 1847 (10 & 11 Vict. c. xl))
River Dee Turnpike Road (County of Kincardine) Act 1837	7 Will. 4 & 1 Vict. c. v	22 March 1837
An Act for making and maintaining a Turnpike Road along the South Side of the River Dee in the County of Kincardine.
Rochdale and Burnley Road Act 1837	7 Will. 4 & 1 Vict. c. vi	22 March 1837
An Act for repairing, maintaining, and improving the Road from the Town of Rochdale to near Hand Bridge near the Town of Burnley, and other Roads communicating therewith, and for making and maintaining other Roads also to communicate therewith, all in the County Palatine of Lancaster.
Leicester Court of Requests Act 1837 (repealed)	7 Will. 4 & 1 Vict. c. vii	21 April 1837
An Act to extend the Powers and Provisions of an Act passed in the last Session of Parliament, (Note: Leicester Court of Requests Act 1836 (6 & 7 Will. 4. c. xxiii)) for the more easy and speedy Recovery of Small Debts within the Borough of Leicester, to several other Towns, Parishes, and Places in the County of Leicester. (Repealed by County Courts Act 1846 (9 & 10 Vict. c. 95))
Hinckley Court of Requests Act 1837 (repealed)	7 Will. 4 & 1 Vict. c. viii	21 April 1837
An Act for more easy and speedy recovering Small Debts within the Parish of Hinckley and other Places therein mentioned in the Counties of Leicester and Warwick. (Repealed by County Courts Act 1846 (9 & 10 Vict. c. 95))
Loughborough Court of Requests Act 1837 (repealed)	7 Will. 4 & 1 Vict. c. ix	21 April 1837
An Act for the more easy and speedy Recovery of Small Debts within the Town of Loughborough. and other Places therein mentioned, in the Counties of Leicester and Nottingham. (Repealed by County Courts Act 1846 (9 & 10 Vict. c. 95))
Whitby (Yorkshire) Improvement Act 1837	7 Will. 4 & 1 Vict. c. x	21 April 1837
An Act for better paving, cleansing, lighting, watching, and improving the Town of Whitby in the North Riding of the County of York.
Bridgwater and Taunton Canal Navigation Act 1837	7 Will. 4 & 1 Vict. c. xi	21 April 1837
An Act to enable the Company of Proprietors of the Bridgewater and Taunton Canal Navigation to continue the Line of the Canal below the Town of Bridgewater, and for varying the Powers of the several Acts relative to the said Canal.
Licensed Victuallers and General Fire and Life Assurance Act 1837 (repealed)	7 Will. 4 & 1 Vict. c. xii	21 April 1837
An Act to enable "The Licensed Victuallers and General Fire and Life Assurance Company" to sue and be sued in the Name of the Chairman, Deputy Chairman, or of any One of the Directors of the said Company, and for other Purposes. (Repealed by Monarch Fire and Life Assurance Company Act 1850 (13 & 14 Vict. c.xviii))
Patent Dry Gas Meter Company Act 1837	7 Will. 4 & 1 Vict. c. xiii	21 April 1837
An Act for forming and regulating a Company to be called "The Patent Dry Gas Meter Company," and to enable the said Company to purchase certain Letters Patent.
Aberdeenshire Roads Act 1837 (repealed)	7 Will. 4 & 1 Vict. c. xiv	21 April 1837
An Act for making and maintaining certain Roads in the County of Aberdeen. (Repealed by Aberdeenshire Roads Act 1865 (28 & 29 Vict. c. ccxl))
Granton Pier Act 1837 (repealed)	7 Will. 4 & 1 Vict. c. xv	21 April 1837
An Act to enable the Duke of Buccleuch and Queenberry to make and maintain a Pier at Granton in the Parish of Cramond, and a Road therefrom to join the Road leading from Leith to Queensferry in the County of Edinburgh. (Repealed by Forth Ports Authority Order Confirmation Act 1969 (c. xxxiv))
Lobley Hill and Burtryford Roads (Durham) Act 1837	7 Will. 4 & 1 Vict. c. xvi	21 April 1837
An Act for more effectually repairing the Road from the Turnpike Road between Gateshead and Hexham, near Lobley Hill in the County of Durham, to Burtryford in the Parish of Stanhope in the same County, together with several Branches therefrom.
Sevenoaks, Tunbridge Wells and Woodsgate Roads Amendment Act 1837	7 Will. 4 & 1 Vict. c. xvii	21 April 1837
An Act for amending an Act (Note: Sevenoaks, Tunbridge Wells and Woodsgate Roads Act 1835 (5 & 6 Will. 4. c. lxiv)) of His present Majesty for repairing the Roads from Sevenoaks Common to Woodsgate, Tunbridge Wells, and Kipping's Cross, and from Tunbridge Wells to Woodsgate, in the County of Kent.
Cardiff Improvement Act 1837	7 Will. 4 & 1 Vict. c. xviii	5 May 1837
An Act for better paving, cleansing, lighting, and otherwise improving the Town of Cardiff in the County of Glamorgan.
Cardiff Gas Act 1837 (repealed)	7 Will. 4 & 1 Vict. c. xix	5 May 1837
An Act for better lighting with Gas the Town of Cardiff in the County of Glamorgan. (Repealed by Cardiff Gaslight Act 1854 (17 & 18 Vict. c. xxxiii))
Stamford Water Act 1837 (repealed)	7 Will. 4 & 1 Vict. c. xx	5 May 1837
An Act for better supplying with Water the Town and Borough of Stamford, and Places adjacent thereto, in the Counties of Northampton and Lincoln. (Repealed by South Lincolnshire Water Board Order 1964 (SI 1964/1746))
Sheffield, Ashton-under-Lyne and Manchester Railway Act 1837 (repealed)	7 Will. 4 & 1 Vict. c. xxi	5 May 1837
An Act for making a Railway from Sheffield in the West Riding of the County of York to Manchester in the County of Lancaster. (Repealed by Manchester, Sheffield and Lincolnshire Railway Act 1849 (12 & 13 Vict. c. lxxxi))
Lancaster and Preston Junction Railway Act 1837	7 Will. 4 & 1 Vict. c. xxii	5 May 1837
An Act for making and maintaining a Railway from the Town of Lancaster to the Town of Preston in the County Palatine of Lancaster.
North Midland Railway Company Act 1837 (repealed)	7 Will. 4 & 1 Vict. c. xxiii	5 May 1837
An Act to enable the North Midland Railway Company to alter the Line of the said Railway, and also to make Two Branches to communicate with the same. (Repealed by Midland Railway Consolidation Act 1844 (7 & 8 Vict. c. xviii))
Manchester and Leeds Railway Act 1837	7 Will. 4 & 1 Vict. c. xxiv	5 May 1837
An Act for enabling the Manchester and Leeds Railway Company to vary the Line of such Railway, and for amending and enlarging the Powers and Provision of the Act (Note: Manchester and Leeds Railway Act 1836 (6 & 7 Will. 4. c. cxi)) relating thereto.
Whitby and Pickering Railway Act 1837	7 Will. 4 & 1 Vict. c. xxv	5 May 1837
An Act to enlarge and amend the Powers and Provisions of an Act (Note: Whitby and Pickering Railway Act 1833 (3 & 4 Will. 4. c. xxxv)) relating to the Whitby and Pickering Railway in the North Riding of the County of York.
Birmingham and Gloucester Railway (Worcester and Tewkesbury Branches) Act 1837	7 Will. 4 & 1 Vict. c. xxvi	5 May 1837
An Act to amend an Act passed in the last Session of Parliament, (Note: Birmingham and Gloucester Railway Act 1836 (6 & 7 Will. 4. c. xiv)) for making a Railway from Birmingham to Gloucester, to extend the Line of the said Railway, and to make Branches therefrom to the City of Worcester and the Town of Tewkesbury.
Liverpool and Manchester Railway Company Act 1837 (repealed)	7 Will. 4 & 1 Vict. c. xxvii	5 May 1837
An Act for enabling the Liverpool and Manchester Railway Company to raise more Money, and for amending and enlarging the Powers and Provisions of the several Acts relating to the said Railway. (Repealed by Grand Junction Railway Act 1845 (8 & 9 Vict. c. cxcviii))
Preston and Wyre Railway and Harbour Act 1837	7 Will. 4 & 1 Vict. c. xxviii	5 May 1837
An Act to alter the Line of the Preston and Wyre Railway, and to amend the Act (Note: Preston and Wyre Railway and Harbour Act 1835 (5 & 6 Will. 4. c. lviii)) relating thereto.
Wyre Dock Act 1837	7 Will. 4 & 1 Vict. c. xxix	5 May 1837
An Act for making and maintaining a Dock or Docks at Wyre in the County Palatine of Lancaster.
Victoria Park, Manchester Act 1837	7 Will. 4 & 1 Vict. c. xxx	5 May 1837
An Act for establishing a Company for the Purpose of laying out and maintaining an ornamental Park within the Townships of Rusholme, Chorlton-upon-Medlock, and Moss-side, in the County of Lancaster.
Streatley and Goring Bridge Act 1837	7 Will. 4 & 1 Vict. c. xxxi	5 May 1837
An Act for building a Bridge over the River Thames from Streatley in the County of Berks to the opposite Shore in the Parish of Goring in the County of Oxford, and for making convenient Approaches thereto.
Edinburgh Police Act 1837 (repealed)	7 Will. 4 & 1 Vict. c. xxxii	5 May 1837
An Act for continuing, altering, and amending certain Acts for regulating the Police of the City of Edinburgh and the adjoining Districts, and for other Purposes relating thereto. (Repealed by Edinburgh Municipal and Police Act 1879 (42 & 43 Vict. c. cxxxii))
Halifax to Sheffield Road (Third District) Act 1837 (repealed)	7 Will. 4 & 1 Vict. c. xxxiii	5 May 1837
An Act for widening and improving the Road from Halifax to Sheffield in the West Riding of the County of York, so far as relates to the Third District of the said Road; and for diverting the said District of Road, and making a new Line of Road therefrom. (Repealed by Annual Turnpike Acts Continuance Act 1869 (32 & 33 Vict. c. 90))
Road from Dryclough to Rochdale Act 1837 (repealed)	7 Will. 4 & 1 Vict. c. xxxiv	5 May 1837
An Act for improving and maintaining the Road from Dryclough, through Shaw, New Hey, and Milnrow, to Rochdale, and other Roads in the County of Lancaster. (Repealed by Dryclough, Shaw and Rochdale Roads Act 1866 (29 & 30 Vict. c. xxi))
Llanrwst Roads Act 1837	7 Will. 4 & 1 Vict. c. xxxv	5 May 1837
An Act for more effectually repairing, improving, and maintaining certain Roads leading to and from the Town of Llanrwst in the County of Denbigh.
Road from Leeds to Otley Act 1837	7 Will. 4 & 1 Vict. c. xxxvi	8 June 1837
An Act for repairing, maintaining, and improving the Line of the Road from Leeds to Otley in the West Riding of the County of York.
Blackfriars Street and Duke Street Junction Road (Glasgow) Act 1837	7 Will. 4 & 1 Vict. c. xxxvii	8 June 1837
An Act for making and maintaining a Road from the Road leading from Glasgow to Carntyne, called Duke Street, to the East End of Blackfriars Street or Regent Street in the said City of Glasgow.
Biddulph and Congleton Road (Cheshire) Act 1837	7 Will. 4 & 1 Vict. c. xxxviii	8 June 1837
An Act for better maintaining the Road from Gillow Hollow in the Parish of Biddulph in the County of Stafford to the Congleton and Leek Turnpike Road at Park Lane in the Township of Congleton in the County of Chester, with the Road therefrom at Lick Lane in the said Parish of Biddulph.
Roads in Roxburgh Act 1837	7 Will. 4 & 1 Vict. c. xxxix	8 June 1837
An Act for further and more effectually repairing, amending, and maintaining certain Roads in the County of Roxburgh, and other Roads connected therewith, leading into the Counties of Berwick, Northumberland, and Durham.
Darlaston Turnpike Act 1837 or the Newcastle-under-Lyme Roads (Staffordshire) Act 1837	7 Will. 4 & 1 Vict. c. xl	8 June 1837
An Act for more effectually improving the several Roads from Newcastle-under-Lyme to Darlaston Bridge, Butt Lane, and Linley Lane, and through Trent Vale and Stoke-upon-Trent to Shelton Wharf, all in the County of Stafford.
Antrim and Coleraine Turnpike Roads Act 1837 (repealed)	7 Will. 4 & 1 Vict. c. xli	8 June 1837
An Act for maintaining, repairing, and amending Turnpike Roads from the Town of Antrim in the County of Antrim towards Coleraine in the County of Londonderry. (Repealed by Antrim and Coleraine Turnpikes Abolition Act 1856 (19 & 20 Vict. c. xlvi))
Belfast and Lisburne Turnpike Road Act 1837 (repealed)	7 Will. 4 & 1 Vict. c. xlii	8 June 1837
An Act for maintaining, repairing, and amending a Turnpike Road from Belfast to Lisburne by Malone and by the Falls, and Two Turnpike Roads leading from the Falls Road by Dundrod and Castlerobin respectively to Crumlin, in the County of Antrim. (Repealed by Turnpike Trusts Abolition (Ireland) Act 1857 (20 & 21 Vict. c. 16))
Manchester and Oldham Road Act 1837	7 Will. 4 & 1 Vict. c. xliii	8 June 1837
An Act for more effectually amending the Roads from Manchester in the County of Lancaster through Oldham to Austerlands in the County of York, and from Oldham to Ashton-under-Lyne, and from Oldham to Rochdale, and other Roads, and for making and maintaining new Lines to communicate therewith, all in the said County of Lancaster.
Butterhouse Green and Thorneley Lane End Road (Cheshire, Lancashire) Act 1837	7 Will. 4 & 1 Vict. c. xliv	8 June 1837
An Act for making and maintaining a Turnpike Road from Butterhouse Green in the County of Chester to Thorneley Lane End in the County of Lancaster.
Ashbourne and Leek Road Act 1837	7 Will. 4 & 1 Vict. c. xlv	8 June 1837
An Act for amending Two several Acts, (Note: Ashbourne and Leek, and Rushton Common and Congleton Roads Act 1826 (7 Geo. 4. c. lxxix)) (Note: Ashbourne and Leek, and Rushton Common and Congleton Roads Act 1829 (10 Geo. 4. c. xxix)) of the Seventh and Tenth Years of His late Majesty King George the Fourth, for repairing the Road from Ashbourne in the County of Derby to Leek in the County of Stafford, and from Ryecroft Gate upon Rushton Common to Congleton in the County of Chester.
Elland Bridge and Dewsbury Road (West Yorkshire) Act 1837	7 Will. 4 & 1 Vict. c. xlvi	8 June 1837
An Act for repairing and maintaining the Road leading from Elland Bridge in the Parish of Halifax into the Dewsbury and Elland Turnpike Road near the Obelisk in the Parish of Dewsbury, all in the West Riding of the County of York.
Sun Life Assurance Society Act 1837 (repealed)	7 Will. 4 & 1 Vict. c. xlvii	8 June 1837
An Act to enable the Managers of the Sun Life Assurance Society to appropriate any Part of the Profits thereof for the Benefit of any Persons who have already effected or may hereafter effect Policies of Assurance with the said Society, (Repealed by Sun Life Assurance Act 1889 (52 & 53 Vict. c. xvii))
Police in Glasgow Act 1837	7 Will. 4 & 1 Vict. c. xlviii	8 June 1837
An Act to continue for a limited Term of Years the Acts relating to the Police of the City of Glasgow; to vest the Management of the Statute Labour Conversion Money of the said City in the Board of Police thereof; and for other Purposes therein mentioned.
Gorbals Police Act 1837 (repealed)	7 Will. 4 & 1 Vict. c. xlix	8 June 1837
An Act to continue for a limited Term of Years the Police Act for the Barony of Gorbals in the County of Lanark, (Note: Gorbals Improvement Act 1823 (4 Geo. 4. c. lxxi)) and for other Purposes relating thereto. (Repealed by Gorbals Improvement Act 1843 (6 & 7 Vict. c. xciii))
London and Greenwich Railway Act 1837	7 Will. 4 & 1 Vict. c. l	8 June 1837
An Act to enlarge the Powers of an Act passed in the Third Year of the Reign of His present Majesty, intituled "An Act for making a Railway from London to Greenwich." (Note: London and Greenwich Railway Act 1833 (3 & 4 Will. 4. c. xlvi))
Trinity Harbour (Edinburgh) Act 1837	7 Will. 4 & 1 Vict. c. li	8 June 1837
An Act for constructing a Harbour, Dock or Docks, Piers, and other Works at Trinity in the Parish of North Leith and County of Edinburgh.
Swansea Water Act 1837	7 Will. 4 & 1 Vict. c. lii	8 June 1837
An Act for better supplying with Water the Town and Borough of Swansea in the County of Glamorgan.
Stourbridge Extension Canal Act 1837	7 Will. 4 & 1 Vict. c. liii	8 June 1837
An Act for making a Canal from the Stourbridge Navigation near Brockmoor in the Parish of Kingswinford in the County of Stafford to the Oak Farm Colliery, with a Branch to the Standhills, both in the said Parish of Kingswinford and County of Stafford.
Holme Reservoirs Act 1837 (repealed)	7 Will. 4 & 1 Vict. c. liv	8 June 1837
An Act for making and maintaining certain Reservoirs in the several Townships of Holme, Cartworth, Austonley, Upperthong, Wooldale, and Hepworth, in the several Parishes of Kirkburton and Almondbury, in the West Riding of the County of York. (Repealed by Huddersfield Corporation Act 1937 (1 Edw. 8 & 1 Geo. 6. c. lxix))
Wakefield Water Act 1837 (repealed)	7 Will. 4 & 1 Vict. c. lv	8 June 1837
An Act for better supplying with Water the Town of Wakefield and the Neighbourhood thereof in the West Riding of the County of York. (Repealed by Wakefield Waterworks Act 1862 (25 & 26 Vict. c. xcix))
Greenwich Pier Act 1837 (repealed)	7 Will. 4 & 1 Vict. c. lvi	8 June 1837
An Act to alter and amend an Act of the last Session of Parliament, intituled "An Act for making and maintaining a Pier Wharf and other Works at Greenwich in the County of Kent;" (Note: Greenwich Pier Act 1836 (6 & 7 Will. 4. c. cxxviii)) and to extend the Powers of the said Act. (Repealed by Local Law (Greater London Council and Inner London Boroughs) Order 1965 (SI 1965/540))
Polver Drain Act 1837	7 Will. 4 & 1 Vict. c. lvii	8 June 1837
An Act for more effectually draining of certain Fen Lands and Low Grounds in the Honor, Manor, and Parish of Wormegay in the County of Norfolk, and other Lands and Grounds which arc now drained by means of or through a certain Drain called "Polver Drain" in the said County.
Worcester Markets and Drainage Act 1837 (repealed)	7 Will. 4 & 1 Vict. c. lviii	8 June 1837
An Act for removing the Markets held in the City of Worcester in the County of Worcester for the Sale of Cattle, Horses, Sheep, and Pigs, and for providing another Market Place in lieu thereof, and for providing for the better and more effectual draining the said City. (Repealed by Ministry of Health Provisional Orders Confirmation (No. 7) Act 1925 (15 & 16 Geo. 5. c. lxxxiii))
Dundee Improvement Act 1837	7 Will. 4 & 1 Vict. c. lix	8 June 1837
An Act to alter and amend an Act of the Sixth Year of the Reign of His late Majesty, (Note: Dundee Improvement Act 1825 (6 Geo. 4. c. clxxxiii)) for opening certain Streets in the Burgh of Dundee, and for otherwise improving the said Burgh.
Mertoun Mill Bridge over Tweed (Berwickshire) Act 1837	7 Will. 4 & 1 Vict. c. lx	8 June 1837
An Act for building a Bridge over the River Tweed at or near to Mertoun Mill in the County of Berwick, and for making Avenues and Approaches thereto.
Waterford Rates Act 1837	7 Will. 4 & 1 Vict. c. lxi	8 June 1837
An Act for the uniform Valuation of Lands and Tenements in the County of Waterford in Ireland, for the Purpose of levying the County Rates therein.
Plymouth and Devonport Court of Requests Act 1837 (repealed)	7 Will. 4 & 1 Vict. c. lxii	8 June 1837
An Act for the Recovery of Small Debts within the Southern Division of the Hundred of Roborough and within the Hundred of Plympton in the County of Devon, and within the Southern Division of the Hundred of East in the County of Cornwall. (Repealed by County Courts Act 1846 (9 & 10 Vict. c. 95))
Chester and Crewe Railway Act 1837 (repealed)	7 Will. 4 & 1 Vict. c. lxiii	30 June 1837
An Act for making a Railway from the City of Chester to join "The Grand Junction Railway" near Crewe Hall in the County of Chester, to be called "The Chester and Crewe Railway." (Repealed by Chester and Crewe Railway Act 1840 (3 & 4 Vict. c. xlix))
London and Birmingham Railway Act 1837 (repealed)	7 Will. 4 & 1 Vict. c. lxiv	30 June 1837
An Act to amend the Acts relating to the London and Birmingham Railway. (Repealed by London and North Western Railway Act 1846 (9 & 10 Vict. c. cciv))
Birmingham and Derby Junction Railway Act 1837	7 Will. 4 & 1 Vict. c. lxv	30 June 1837
An Act to rectify a Mistake in an Act of the last Session of Parliament (Note: Birmingham and Derby Junction Railway Act 1836 (6 & 7 Will. 4. c. xxxv)) for making a Railway from the London and Birmingham Railway near Birmingham to Derby, to be called the Birmingham and Derby Junction Railway, with a Branch.
Leicester and Swannington Railway Company Act 1837	7 Will. 4 & 1 Vict. c. lxvi	30 June 1837
An Act to enable the Leicester and Swannington Railway Company to raise a further Sum of Money.
Durham and Sunderland Railway Act 1837	7 Will. 4 & 1 Vict. c. lxvii	30 June 1837
An Act to enable the Durham and Sunderland Railway Company to alter a Part of the Main Line of their Railway, to abandon another Part thereof, to make other Branches therefrom; and to amend and enlarge the Powers of the Act (Note: Durham and Sunderland Railway Act 1834 (4 & 5 Will. 4. c. xcvi)) for incorporating the said Company.
York and North Midland Railway Act 1837	7 Will. 4 & 1 Vict. c. lxviii	30 June 1837
An Act to alter the Line of the York and North Midland Railway, and to amend the Act (Note: York and North Midland Railway Act 1836 (6 & 7 Will. 4. c. lxxxi)) relating thereto.
Manchester and Birmingham Railway Act 1837 (repealed)	7 Will. 4 & 1 Vict. c. lxix	30 June 1837
An Act for making a Railway from Manchester to join the Grand Junction Railway in the Parish of Chebsey in the County of Stafford, to be called "The Manchester and Birmingham Railway," with certain Branches therefrom. (Repealed by London and North Western Railway Act 1846 (9 & 10 Vict. c. cciv))
Taff Vale Railway Act 1837	7 Will. 4 & 1 Vict. c. lxx	30 June 1837
An Act to enable the Taff Vale Railway Company to alter the Line of the said Railway and the Act (Note: Taff Vale Railway Act 1836 (6 & 7 Will. 4. c. lxxxii)) relating thereto, and to make additional Branches.
London and South Western Railway Deviations Act 1837	7 Will. 4 & 1 Vict. c. lxxi	30 June 1837
An Act to alter the Line of the London and Southampton Railway, and to amend the Act (Note: London and South Western Railway Act 1834 (4 & 5 Will. 4. c. lxxxviii)) relating thereto.
Newcastle-upon-Tyne Improvement Act 1837	7 Will. 4 & 1 Vict. c. lxxii	30 June 1837
An Act for regulating and improving the Borough of Newcastle upon Tyne.
Ipswich Improvement Act 1837	7 Will. 4 & 1 Vict. c. lxxiii	30 June 1837
An Act to amend the several Acts for paving, lighting, cleansing, and otherwise improving the Town of Ipswich in the County of Suffolk, and for removing and preventing Encroachments, Obstructions, and Annoyances therein.
Ipswich Port Act 1837 or the Ipswich Dock Act 1837 (repealed)	7 Will. 4 & 1 Vict. c. lxxiv	30 June 1837
An Act to amend an Act of the Forty-fifth Year of the Reign of King George the Third, (Note: Ipswich Port Improvement Act 1805 (45 Geo. 3. c. ci)) for improving and rendering more commodious the Port of Ipswich, and for constructing a Wet Dock there. (Repealed by Ipswich Port Authority Act 1986 (c. xv))
Brixham Harbour and Market Act 1837	7 Will. 4 & 1 Vict. c. lxxv	30 June 1837
An Act for improving, enlarging, and maintaining the Pier, Harbour, and Market of Brixham in the County of Devon, and for the Formation of a Breakwater in Torbay.
Belfast Port and Harbour Act 1837 (repealed)	7 Will. 4 & 1 Vict. c. lxxvi	30 June 1837
An Act for the Formation of a new Cut or Channel, and for otherwise more effectually improving the Port and Harbour of Belfast. (Repealed by Belfast Port and Harbour Act 1843 (6 & 7 Vict. c. lvi))
Warkworth Harbour Act 1837 (repealed)	7 Will. 4 & 1 Vict. c. lxxvii	30 June 1837
An Act for forming a Harbour in the Parish of Warkworth in the County of Northumberland, by improving the Navigation of the River Coquet, and for rendering the same safe and commodious, and easy of Access. (Repealed by Warkworth Harbour Act 1847 (10 & 11 Vict. c. cxxviii))
Hartlepool Port Act 1837 (repealed)	7 Will. 4 & 1 Vict. c. lxxviii	30 June 1837
An Act for amending an Act of the Second Year of the Reign of His late Majesty King William the Fourth, (Note: Hartlepool Pier and Port Act 1832 (2 & 3 Will. 4. c. lxviii)) and for granting further Rates and Powers for improving the Port of Hartlepool in the County of Durham. (Repealed by Hartlepool Pier and Port Act 1851 (14 & 15 Vict. c. cxvii))
Glossop Reservoirs Act 1837 (repealed)	7 Will. 4 & 1 Vict. c. lxxix	30 June 1837
An Act for making and maintaining Reservoirs upon the tributary Streams of the River Etherow otherwise the Mersey in the Parish of Glossop in the County of Derby, for more effectually and regularly supplying with Water the Mills, Manufactories, and Works on the said tributary Streams and River. (Repealed by Glossop Water Act 1952 (15 & 16 Geo. 6 & 1 Eliz. 2. c. xxxv))
Ellesmere and Chester Canal Act 1837	7 Will. 4 & 1 Vict. c. lxxx	30 June 1837
An Act to amend and enlarge the Powers of the several Acts relating to the Ellesmere and Chester Canal.
Ouse Banks Repair Act 1837	7 Will. 4 & 1 Vict. c. lxxxi	30 June 1837
An Act to raise and apply Funds for the future Maintenance and Repair of the Banks of the River Ouze between Denver Sluice and the Eau Brink Cut in the County of Norfolk.
Barnsley Water Act 1837	7 Will. 4 & 1 Vict. c. lxxxii	30 June 1837
An Act for better supplying with Water the Town and Neighbourhood of Barnsley in the West Riding of the County of York.
Leeds Waterworks Act 1837 (repealed)	7 Will. 4 & 1 Vict. c. lxxxiii	30 June 1837
An Act for the better supplying with Water the Town and Neighbourhood of Leeds in the West Riding of the County of York. (Repealed by Leeds Waterworks Act 1847 (10 & 11 Vict. c. cclxii))
Bristol Court of Conscience Act 1837 (repealed)	7 Will. 4 & 1 Vict. c. lxxxiv	30 June 1837
An Act for granting more effectual Powers for the Regulation of the Court of Conscience within the City of Bristol. (Repealed by County Courts Act 1846 (9 & 10 Vict. c. 95))
Bristol Encroachment Act 1837	7 Will. 4 & 1 Vict. c. lxxxv	30 June 1837
An Act for removing and preventing Encroachments within the City and County of Bristol, and for better regulating the Shipping, Rivers, Wharfs, Backs, and Quays, and the Markets within the same; and for other Purposes.
Bristol Rates Act 1837 (repealed)	7 Will. 4 & 1 Vict. c. lxxxvi	30 June 1837
An Act for the better assessing and collecting certain Parochial and other Rates within the City and County of Bristol. (Repealed by Bristol Corporation Act 1897 (60 & 61 Vict. c. ccxxx))
Shropshire and North Wales Assurance Company Act 1837	7 Will. 4 & 1 Vict. c. lxxxvii	30 June 1837
An Act to enable the Shropshire and North Wales Assurance Company to sue and be sued in the Name of the Managing Director for the Time being, or of any One of the general or local Directors of the said Company.
West Cork Mining Company Amendment Act 1837	7 Will. 4 & 1 Vict. c. lxxxviii	30 June 1837
An Act for amending and enlarging the Provisions of an Act passed in the Fourth Year of the Reign of His present Majesty, intituled "An Act to encourage the working of Mines and Quarries in Ireland, and to regulate a Joint Stock Company for that Purpose, to be called 'The West Cork Mining Company.'" (Note: West Cork Mining Company Act 1834 (4 & 5 Will. 4. c. lxix))
Sligo Salmon Fishery Act 1837	7 Will. 4 & 1 Vict. c. lxxxix	30 June 1837
An Act to enable Edward Joshua Cooper Esquire to establish and protect a Salmon Fishery upon the Lakes and Rivers of Owenmore and Arrow, and also within the Bay of Ballisodare, in the County of Sligo in Ireland.
Over Inclosure (Cambridgeshire) Act 1837	7 Will. 4 & 1 Vict. c. xc	30 June 1837
An Act for draining, inclosing, dividing, and allotting, certain Lands in the Parish of Over in the County of Cambridge.
Great Western Railway Act 1837	7 Will. 4 & 1 Vict. c. xci	3 July 1837
An Act to alter the Line of the Great Western Railway, and to amend the Acts relating thereto.
Great Western Railway Paddington Extension Act 1837	7 Will. 4 & 1 Vict. c. xcii	3 July 1837
An Act to enable the Great Western Railway Company to extend the Line of such Railway, and for other Purposes relating thereto.
South Eastern Railway Act 1837	7 Will. 4 & 1 Vict. c. xciii	3 July 1837
An Act to alter and extend the Line of the South-eastern Railway, and to amend the Act (Note: South Eastern Railway Act 1836 (6 & 7 Will. 4. c. lxxv)) relating thereto.
Slamannan Railway (Bathgate Branch) Act 1837	7 Will. 4 & 1 Vict. c. xciv	3 July 1837
An Act to alter, amend, and enlarge the Powers of an Act for making the Slamannan Railway, passed in the Sixth Year of His present Majesty, (Note: Slamannan Railway Act 1835 (5 & 6 Will. 4. c. lv)) and to enable the Slamannan Railway Company to make and maintain a Branch to Bathgate in the County of Linlithgow.
Great North of England, Clarence and Hartlepool Junction Railway Act 1837	7 Will. 4 & 1 Vict. c. xcv	3 July 1837
An Act for making and maintaining a Railway to connect the Great North of England, Clarence, and Hartlepool Railways, in the County of Durham.
Dundalk Western Railway Act 1837	7 Will. 4 & 1 Vict. c. xcvi	3 July 1837
An Act for making and maintaining a Railway from the Town of Dundalk in the County of Louth to the Town of Ballybay, in the County of Monaghan.
Durham Junction Railway (Houghton-le-Spring Branch) Act 1837	7 Will. 4 & 1 Vict. c. xcvii	3 July 1837
An Act to authorize the Durham Junction Railway Company to make a Branch Railway from the Durham Junction Railway, to be called "The Houghton-le-Spring Branch."
Liverpool Improvement Act 1837 (repealed)	7 Will. 4 & 1 Vict. c. xcviii	3 July 1837
An Act for altering, amending, improving, and extending the Provisions of certain Acts of Parliament relating to the Town of Liverpool in the County Palatine of Lancaster. (Repealed by Liverpool Corporation Act 1921 (11 & 12 Geo. 5. c. lxxiv))
Montrose Harbour Act 1837	7 Will. 4 & 1 Vict. c. xcix	3 July 1837
An Act for improving the Harbour of the Burgh of Montrose in the County of Forfar.
Wishaw and Coltness Railway Act 1837	7 Will. 4 & 1 Vict. c. c	12 July 1837
An Act for further extending the Time for completing the Wishaw and Coltness Railway in the County of Lanark.
Maryport and Carlisle Railway Act 1837 (repealed)	7 Will. 4 & 1 Vict. c. ci	12 July 1837
An Act for making a Railway from the Town and Port of Maryport to the Borough of Carlisle, to be called "The Maryport and Carlisle Railway." (Repealed by Maryport and Carlisle Railway Act 1855 (18 & 19 Vict. c. lxxix))
Great North of England Railway Act 1837	7 Will. 4 & 1 Vict. c. cii	12 July 1837
An Act to enable "The Great North of England Railway Company" to extend the Line of their Railway, and to make Two Branches therefrom; and for other Purposes relating thereto.
Clarence Railway Act 1837	7 Will. 4 & 1 Vict. c. ciii	12 July 1837
An Act to alter, amend, explain, and enlarge the Powers of the several Acts for making and maintaining the Clarence Railway.
Great Leinster and Munster Railway Act 1837	7 Will. 4 & 1 Vict. c. civ	12 July 1837
An Act for making and maintaining a Railway from the City of Dublin to the City of Kilkenny, to be called the Great Leinster and Munster Railway.
Kilmarnock and Troon Railway Act 1837	7 Will. 4 & 1 Vict. c. cv	12 July 1837
An Act to enable the Kilmarnock and Troon Railway Company to raise a farther Sum of Money; to alter and amend the Line of the said Railway; and for other Purposes relating thereto.
Dublin and Drogheda Railway Act 1837	7 Will. 4 & 1 Vict. c. cvi	12 July 1837
An Act to alter the Line of the Dublin and Drogheda Railway, and to amend the Act (Note: Dublin and Drogheda Railway Act 1836 (6 & 7 Will. 4. c. cxxxii)) relating thereto.
Chester and Birkenhead Railway Act 1837 (repealed)	7 Will. 4 & 1 Vict. c. cvii	12 July 1837
An Act for making a Railway from the City of Chester to Birkenhead. (Repealed by Birkenhead, Lancashire and Cheshire Junction Railway Act 1852 (15 & 16 Vict. c. clxvii))
Cork and Passage Railway Act 1837	7 Will. 4 & 1 Vict. c. cviii	12 July 1837
An Act for making a Railway from the City of Cork to the Town of Passage.
Dundee Improvement (No. 2) Act 1837	7 Will. 4 & 1 Vict. c. cix	12 July 1837
An Act for the better paving, lighting, watching, and cleansing the Burgh of Dundee, and for maintaining and regulating the Police of the same and Places adjacent, and other Purposes relating thereto.
Bridlington Piers and Harbour Act 1837	7 Will. 4 & 1 Vict. c. cx	12 July 1837
An Act for improving the Piers and Harbour of Bridlington in the East Riding of the County of York, and for rendering the same more safe and commodious as a Harbour of Refuge.
Campsie Canal Act 1837	7 Will. 4 & 1 Vict. c. cxi	12 July 1837
An Act to make and maintain a Canal from the Forth and Clyde Canal in the County of Lanark to Campsie Alum Works in the County of Stirling.
Manchester Gas Works Act 1837 (repealed)	7 Will. 4 & 1 Vict. c. cxii	12 July 1837
An Act for enabling the Directors of the Manchester Gas Works to purchase Land, Buildings, and Apparatus for the Extension of their Works. (Repealed by Manchester General Improvement Act 1851 (14 & 15 Vict. c. cxix))
River Welland Navigation Act 1837	7 Will. 4 & 1 Vict. c. cxiii	12 July 1837
An Act to increase the Tonnage Rates and Duties granted by an Act passed in the Fifth Year of the Reign of His late Majesty King George the Fourth, (Note: River Welland Outfall Act 1824 (5 Geo. 4. c. xcvi)) for improving the Outfall of the River Welland in the County of Lincoln; and to alter and enlarge the Powers of the said Act.
South London Market Company Act 1837 (repealed)	7 Will. 4 & 1 Vict. c. cxiv	12 July 1837
An Act to alter and amend an Act of the Fourth Year of the Reign of His late Majesty, (Note: South London Market Act 1834 (4 & 5 Will. 4. c. xlv)) for erecting, establishing, and maintaining a Market in the Parish of Saint George the Martyr in the Borough of Southwark. (Repealed by Statute Law (Repeals) Act 2013 (c. 2))
Liverpool Improvement Act 1837 (repealed)	7 Will. 4 & 1 Vict. c. cxv	12 July 1837
An Act to enable the Mayor, Aldermen, and Burgesses of the Borough of Liverpool to open and widen certain Streets and Places in the Town of Liverpool, and otherwise to improve the same; and to enable the said Mayor, Aldermen, and Burgesses to appropriate Lands, Tenements, and Hereditaments for Public Purposes, and also to erect Public Buildings. (Repealed by Liverpool Corporation Act 1921 (11 & 12 Geo. 5. c. lxxiv))
Glasgow, Paisley and Greenock Railway Act 1837	7 Will. 4 & 1 Vict. c. cxvi	15 July 1837
An Act for making and maintaining a Railway from Glasgow to Greenock by Paisley and Port Glasgow, to be called "The Glasgow, Paisley, and Greenock Railway."
Glasgow, Paisley, Kilmarnock and Ayr Railway Act 1837	7 Will. 4 & 1 Vict. c. cxvii	15 July 1837
An Act for making a Railway from Glasgow to Paisley and Ayr, and from a Point on the said Railway near Blairland to Kilmarnock, to be called "The Glasgow, Paisley, Kilmarnock, and Ayr Railway," with Branches.
Polloc and Govan Railway Act 1837	7 Will. 4 & 1 Vict. c. cxviii	15 July 1837
An Act to continue, for certain Purposes, the Powers of Two Acts (Note: Polloc and Govan Railway Act 1830 (11 Geo. 4 & 1 Will. 4. c. lxii)) (Note: Polloc and Govan Railway Act 1831 (1 & 2 Will. 4. c. lviii)) for making and maintaining the Polloc and Govan Railway.
London and Brighton Railway Act 1837	7 Will. 4 & 1 Vict. c. cxix	15 July 1837
An Act for making a Railway from the London and Croydon Railway to Brighton, with Branches to Shoreham, Newhaven, and Lewes.
London and Greenwich Railway Company and Deptford Creek Bridge Company Tolls Agreement Act 1837	7 Will. 4 & 1 Vict. c. cxx	15 July 1837
An Act to enable the London and Greenwich Railway Company to take certain Tolls for Passengers, Cattle, and Carriages crossing the River Ravensborne, in pursuance of an Agreement entered into with "The Deptford Creek Bridge Company."
Bolton and Preston Railway Act 1837	7 Will. 4 & 1 Vict. c. cxxi	15 July 1837
An Act for making a Railway from Bolton le Moors to Preston in the County Palatine of Lancaster.
Bishop Auckland and Weardale Railway Act 1837 (repealed)	7 Will. 4 & 1 Vict. c. cxxii	15 July 1837
An Act for incorporating certain Persons for the making and maintaining a Railway from near the Black Boy Branch of the Stockton and Darlington Railway in the Township of Saint Andrew Auckland to or near to Wilton Park Colliery, with a Branch therefrom, all in the County of Durham, to be called "The Bishop Auckland and Weardale Railway." (Repealed by Stockton and Darlington Railway Amalgamation Act 1858 (21 & 22 Vict. c. cxvi))
Grand Collier Docks Act 1837	7 Will. 4 & 1 Vict. c. cxxiii	15 July 1837
An Act for making Wet Docks and other Works on the South Side of the River Thames, at or near Rotherhithe and Deptford in the Counties of Surrey and Kent, to be called "The Grand Collier Docks."
Fishguard Harbour and Port Act 1837 (repealed)	7 Will. 4 & 1 Vict. c. cxxiv	15 July 1837
An Act for improving the Harbour and Port of Fishguard otherwise Abergwain in the County of Pembroke. (Repealed by Fishguard Harbour Act 1838 (1 & 2 Vict. c. lxxxv))
Dunchattan and Monkland Canal Act 1837	7 Will. 4 & 1 Vict. c. cxxv	15 July 1837
An Act to make and maintain a Canal in the County of Lanark from the Monkland Canal to the Lands of Dunchattan on the North Side of Duke Street of Glasgow.
Dundee Water Act 1837 (repealed)	7 Will. 4 & 1 Vict. c. cxxvi	15 July 1837
An Act for supplying the Royal Burgh of Dundee and Suburbs thereof with Water. (Repealed by Dundee Water Act 1869 (32 & 33 Vict. c. xlvi))
Dublin Streets Act 1837	7 Will. 4 & 1 Vict. c. cxxvii	15 July 1837
An Act to extend, alter, and enlarge the Powers of several Acts for enabling the Commissioners of Wide Streets in Dublin to widen and improve certain Ways, Streets, and Passages in the 8ud City and County of Dublin, and for raising further Funds to enable the said Commissioners to carry the same into execution.
Dowlais Market (Merthyr Tydfil) Act 1837	7 Will. 4 & 1 Vict. c. cxxviii	15 July 1837
An Act for providing a Market Place and Market at the Village of Dowlais in the Parish of Merthyr Tydfil in the County of Glamorgan.
Stockport Improvement Act 1837	7 Will. 4 & 1 Vict. c. cxxix	15 July 1837
An Act for improving and regulating the Borough of Stockport in the several Counties of Chester and Lancaster.
West of London and Westminster Cemetery Company Act 1837	7 Will. 4 & 1 Vict. c. cxxx	15 July 1837
An Act for establishing a Cemetery for the Interment of the Dead Westward of the Metropolis, by a Company to be called "The West of London and Westminster Cemetery Company."
Bristol Cemetery Act 1837	7 Will. 4 & 1 Vict. c. cxxxi	15 July 1837
An Act for establishing a general Cemetery for the Interment of the Dead in or near the City of Bristol.
London Caoutchouc Company Act 1837	7 Will. 4 & 1 Vict. c. cxxxii	15 July 1837
An Act for forming and regulating the London Caoutchouc (Note: Caoutchouc is an old name for natural rubber.) Company, and to enable the said Company to purchase certain Letters Patent.
Commercial Railway Company Act 1837	7 Will. 4 & 1 Vict. c. cxxxiii	17 July 1837
An Act to amend the Act (Note: Commercial Railway Act 1836 (6 & 7 Will. 4. c. cxxiii)) relating to the Commercial Railway Company.

=== Private acts ===
Short title	Citation	Royal assent
Long title
Cranfield Inclosure Act 1837	7 Will. 4 & 1 Vict. c. 1 Pr.	18 March 1837
An Act for inclosing and exonerating from Tithes Lands in the Parish of Cranfield in the County of Bedford.
Mochnant Inclosure Act 1837	7 Will. 4 & 1 Vict. c. 2 Pr.	18 March 1837
An Act for inclosing Lands in the several Parishes of Llanymynech, Llanrhaidr-yn-Mochnant, Llanarmon-mynydd-mawr, Llanarmon-dyffryn-Ceiriog, Llansilin, and Llancadwalader in the County of Denbigh.
Carlton and Lofthouse Inclosure Act 1837	7 Will. 4 & 1 Vict. c. 3 Pr.	18 March 1837
An Act for inclosing Lands in the Township of Lofthouse-cum-Carlton in the Parish of Bothwell in the West Riding of the County of York.
Winfrith and Wool Inclosure Act 1837	7 Will. 4 & 1 Vict. c. 4 Pr.	22 March 1837
An Act for inclosing Lands in the Parishes of Winfrith Newburgh and Wool the County of Dorset.
Newbold Inclosure Act 1837	7 Will. 4 & 1 Vict. c. 5 Pr.	22 March 1837
An Act for inclosing Lands in the Manor of Newbold in the Parish of Chesterfield in the County of Derby.
Mansergh, &c. Inclosure Act 1837	7 Will. 4 & 1 Vict. c. 6 Pr.	21 April 1837
An Act for inclosing Lands within the Townships or Divisions of Mansergh, Lupton, Old Button, and Holme Scales and New Hutton, in the Parishes of Kirkby Lonsdale, Burton-in-Kendal, and Kirkby-in-Kendal in the County of Westmorland.
Ashby and Hellington Inclosure Act 1837	7 Will. 4 & 1 Vict. c. 7 Pr.	5 May 1837
An Act for dividing, allotting, and inclosing the Open Fields and Field Lands, Commons, and Waste Grounds in the Parishes of Ashby and Hellington in the County of Norfolk.
Clapton Inclosure Act 1837	7 Will. 4 & 1 Vict. c. 8 Pr.	8 June 1837
An Act for inclosing Lands in the Parish of Clapton in the County of Somerset.
Clun Forest Inclosure Act 1837	7 Will. 4 & 1 Vict. c. 9 Pr.	8 June 1837
An Act for inclosing Lands in the Honor or Lordship and Forest of Chm in the County of Salop.
Banff Glebe Lands Act 1837	7 Will. 4 & 1 Vict. c. 10 Pr.	8 June 1837
An Act to enable the Minister of the Parish oi Banff in the County of Banff to feu the Glebe Lands of the said Parish.
Angerstein's Estate Act 1837	7 Will. 4 & 1 Vict. c. 11 Pr.	8 June 1837
An Act to enable John Angerstein Esquire to grant Building and Repairing Leases of Lands and Hereditaments in the Parish of Grimsby in the County of Lincoln, and in the Parish of East Greenwich in the County of Kent; and to enable Amelia, the Wife of the said John Angerstein, to grant similar Leases of Parts of the same Estates in the said Parish of East Greenwich.
Rankine's Estate Act 1837	7 Will. 4 & 1 Vict. c. 12 Pr.	10 June 1837
An Act to enable David Sankine Esquire, of Dudhope, to feu certain Portions of the Lands and Estate of Dudhope in the County of Forfar.
Carnegie's Estate Act 1837	7 Will. 4 & 1 Vict. c. 13 Pr.	10 June 1837
An Act to vest certain Parts of the Entailed Estate of Boysadk, in the County of Forfar, belonging to William Fullarton Lindsay Carnegie Esquire, in Trustees to sell the same, and apply the Price thereof in payment of certain Debts affecting the said Estate, in building a Mansion House for the same, and in repayment of certain Sums of Money laid out in improving the said Estate; and to enable the Heir of Entail in Possession of the said Estate to feu certain Parts thereof.
Lockhart's Estate Act 1837	7 Will. 4 & 1 Vict. c. 14 Pr.	10 June 1837
An Act for enabling the Trustees of William Eliott Lockhart deceased, of Borthwickbrae to sell the Lands of Old Melrose and Part of the Estate of Borthwickbrae to pay the Debts affecting the same.
Murray's Estate Act 1837	7 Will. 4 & 1 Vict. c. 15 Pr.	10 June 1837
An Act to enable Alexander Murray Esquire, of Broughton, to borrow a certain Sum of Money upon the Security of certain of his Entailed Estates for Repayment to him of a Portion of the Monies laid out by him in the Improvement of these Estates.
Duke of Argyll's Estate Act 1837	7 Will. 4 & 1 Vict. c. 16 Pr.	10 June 1837
An Act to alter and extend the Powers of an Act passed in the Eleventh Year of the Reign of His late Majesty King George the Fourth, intituled "An Act for empowering George William Duke of Argyll and his Trustee to borrow a Sum of Money, and to make it a Charge on the Estate of Argyll, upon certain Conditions." (Note: Duke of Argyll's Estate Act 1830 (11 Geo. 4 & 1 Will. 4. c. 35 Pr.))
Farr's Estate Act 1837	7 Will. 4 & 1 Vict. c. 17 Pr.	30 June 1837
An Act to enable Edward Farr and others to effect a Sale to Waiter Wilkins Esquire of a Messuage and Lands situate in the Parish of Glasbury in the County of Radnor.
Cearns' Estate Act 1837	7 Will. 4 & 1 Vict. c. 18 Pr.	30 June 1837
An Act for vesting a Piece of Land in the Parish of Childwall in the County of Lancaster, belonging to Edward Paton Cearns an Infant, in Trustees for Sale, and for investing the Monies thence arising in the Purchase of other Estates to be conveyed to the Infant.
Nairne's Estate Act 1837	7 Will. 4 & 1 Vict. c. 19 Pr.	30 June 1837
An Act to vest a Part of the Entailed Estate of Drumkilbo and others in the Counties of Perth and Forfar in Trustees in Fee Simple, for the Sale, and to raise Money thereon for satisfying the Debts contracted for Money laid out or to be laid out in the Improvement of the said Entailed Estate, and in building a Mansion House thereon; and to enable David Nairne Esquire, and the Heirs of Entail succeeding to him, if there be such, to grant Feus of Part of the scud Estate of Drumkilbo and others.
York Dean and Chapter Estate Act 1837	7 Will. 4 & 1 Vict. c. 20 Pr.	30 June 1837
An Act for vesting an Estate belonging to the Dean and Chapter of the Cathedral and Metropolitical Church of Saint Peter in York in Trustees for Sale, and for laying out the Monies arising from such Sales in the Purchase of other Estates, to be settled to the same Uses; subject nevertheless to making Compensation to the Dean and Chapter for the Time being for certain Fines payable on Renewal of the Leases of the said first-mentioned Estate; and also for Payment of certain Debts due on account of the said Cathedral Church.
Rayley's Estate Act 1837	7 Will. 4 & 1 Vict. c. 21 Pr.	30 June 1837
An Act to enable Richard Rayley Esquire to grant Leases of the Messuages, Lands, and Hereditaments appointed or devised by the Will of Richard Rayley Esquire, his late Father, deceased; and for selling certain of the said Messuages, Lands, and Hereditaments, and laying out the Monies to be produced by such Sales in the Purchase of other Estates, to be settled to the same Uses.
Stewart's Estate Act 1837	7 Will. 4 & 1 Vict. c. 22 Pr.	30 June 1837
An Act to enable the Tutors and Curators of Sir Michael Robert Shaw Stewart Baronet to grant Feu Rights of the Estate of Greenock and other Lands in the County of Renfrew.
Hind's Estate Act 1837	7 Will. 4 & 1 Vict. c. 23 Pr.	30 June 1837
An Act for carrying into effect a Contract entered into with Edward Riddell Esquire for the Sale to him of a certain Farm called Broomey Hall Farm, situate in the Township of Dalton in the Parish of Newburn in the County of Northumberland, devised in strict Settlement by the Will of Elizabeth Archer Hind Spinster, deceased; and for applying the Money thence arising in the Purchase of other Hereditaments in lieu thereof, to be settled to the like Uses.
Wigan Rectory Glebe Lands Act 1837 or the Wigan Rectory Estate Act 1837 (repealed)	7 Will. 4 & 1 Vict. c. 24 Pr.	30 June 1837
An Act to enable the Rector of the Parish of Wigan in the County Palatine of Lancaster to grant Leases of the Mines and Building Leases, subject to Ground Rents, of the Glebe Lands belonging to the said Rectory; and for other Purposes. (Repealed by Wigan Rectory Glebe Act 1871 (34 & 35 Vict. c. 7 Pr.))
Duke of Beaufort's Estate Act 1837	7 Will. 4 & 1 Vict. c. 25 Pr.	3 July 1837
An Act for confirming a Lease granted by the Most Noble Henry Charles late Duke of Beaufort to John Vivian Esquire, of Lands and Hereditaments in the Parish of Saint John juxta Swansea in the County of Glamorgan; and also a certain other Lease granted by the said Henry Charles late Duke of Beaufort, and the Most Noble Henry Duke of Beaufort, by his then Name of Henry Marquis of Worcester, to John Williams Esquire, and others, of Lands and Hereditaments in the Parishes of Saint John juxta Swansea and Llangefelach in the said County of Glamorgan.
Lord Dynevor's Estate Act 1837	7 Will. 4 & 1 Vict. c. 26 Pr.	3 July 1837
An Act for vesting the settled undivided Shares of the Right Honourable George Talbot Rice Lord Dynevor in the County of Glamorgan in Trustees for Sale, and with Power to make a Partition thereof.
Watson's Estate Act 1837	7 Will. 4 & 1 Vict. c. 27 Pr.	12 July 1837
An Act for vesting an Estate in the Parish of Steeple Aston in the County of Oxford, devised by the Will of John Marten Watson Gentleman, deceased, in Trustees, for carrying into effect a Contract entered into for the Sale thereof, and for laying out the Monies thence arising in the Purchase of other Estates to be settled to the same Uses.
Lord Sandys's Estate Act 1837	7 Will. 4 & 1 Vict. c. 28 Pr.	12 July 1837
An Act for authorizing Trustees to sell Part of the Settled Estates of the right Honourable Arthur Moyses William Lord Sandys, in the Counties of Worcester, Cambridge, and Bedford, and for laying out the Monies to arise by such Sale in the Purchase of other Estates, to be settled to the same Uses; and also for authorizing the same Trustees to grant Leases for Building and Manufacturing Purposes of other Part of the said Settled Estates in the County of Worcester.
Winchester College Estate Act 1837	7 Will. 4 & 1 Vict. c. 29 Pr.	12 July 1837
An Act for effecting an Exchange between the Warden and Scholars Clerks of Saint Mary College of Winchester near Winchester in the County of Southampton, and the Dean of the Cathedral Church of the Holy Trinity of Winchester in the said County, and the Chapter of the same Church, of divers Messuages or Tenements, Lands and Hereditaments.
East's Estate Act 1837	7 Will. 4 & 1 Vict. c. 30 Pr.	12 July 1837
An Act for confirming a Partition of Estates devised and bequeathed by the Will of Sir William East Baronet, deceased, and other Property; and for confirming a Sale of other Parts of the devised Estates.
Jackson's Estate Act 1837	7 Will. 4 & 1 Vict. c. 31 Pr.	12 July 1837
An Act for extending the Power to grant Building Leases contained in the Will of Handle Jackson Esquire, deceased; and for other Purposes.
Clitheroe Grammar School's Estate Act 1837	7 Will. 4 & 1 Vict. c. 32 Pr.	12 July 1837
An Act to enable the Governors of the Free Grammar School of Clitheroe in the County of Lancaster to sell and grant Building Leases of the School Estates, and to enlarge the Powers of the Governors.
Acland's Estate Act 1837	7 Will. 4 & 1 Vict. c. 33 Pr.	12 July 1837
An Act to transfer the Endowments of the Domestic Chapel of Sir Thomas Dyke Acland Baronet at Columb John in the Parish of Broadclist in the County of Devon, which Chapel is proposed to be pulled down, to a Chapel intended to be built in lieu thereof near his Residence at Killerton in the same Parish.
Duke of Richmond's Estate Act 1837	7 Will. 4 & 1 Vict. c. 34 Pr.	12 July 1837
An Act for authorising the Trustees under an Act passed in the Thirty-ninth and Fortieth Years of His Majesty King George the Third, (Note: Duke of Richmond's Annuity Act 1800 (39 & 40 Geo. 3. c. ciii)) for enabling the Duke of Richmond for the Time being to grant Jointures as therein mentioned, and for other Purposes, to sell the Residue remaining unsold of the Stocks on Transfer of which the said Annuity was made redeemable, and to invest the Money to arise from such Sale in the Purchase of Manors, Lands, and Hereditaments; and for other Purposes.
Eversfield's Estate Act 1837	7 Will. 4 & 1 Vict. c. 35 Pr.	12 July 1837
An Act to extend the Powers given to the Trustees of the Will of Charles Eversfield Esquire by an Act of Parliament passed in the Seventh Year of the Reign of His Majesty King George the Fourth, intituled "An Act to enable Trustees to grant Building Leases of Lands in the several Parishes of Saint Leonard's Hollington, Saint Mary of the Castle of Hastings, Maudlin, Saint Mary Magdalen, Saint Michael near Hastings, and Horsham, in the County of Sussex, Parts of the Estates devised by the Will of Charles Eversfield Esquire, and to sell the same Lands, and also Two detached Farms in the Parishes of Hollington and Horsham aforesaid, other Parts of the same Estates, and for laying out the Money arising by such Sale in the Purchase of other Estates, to be settled to the same Uses." (Note: Charles Eversfield's Estate Act 1827 (7 & 8 Geo. 4. c. 22 Pr.))
Lord Clanmorris's Estate Act 1837	7 Will. 4 & 1 Vict. c. 36 Pr.	12 July 1837
An Act for authorizing the Sale of certain Estates in the Counties of Galway and Mayo devised by the Will of the Right Honourable John late Lord Clanmorris deceased, and for laying out the Monies thence arising in the Purchase of other Estates, to be settled to the same Uses.
Earl of Wilton's Estate Act 1837	7 Will. 4 & 1 Vict. c. 37 Pr.	15 July 1837
An Act to enable the Right Honourable Thomas Earl of Wilton, and the Person or Persons for the Time being entitled to the Estates devised by or standing limited to the Uses of the Wills of the Right Honourable Thomas late Earl of Wilton and the Right Honourable Eleanor late Countess of Wilton, both deceased, to make Conveyances in Fee or Demises for long Terms of Years of certain Parts of the said Estates, for building on or improving the same, under reserved yearly Rents.
Marquis of Donegal's Estate Act 1837	7 Will. 4 & 1 Vict. c. 38 Pr.	15 July 1837
An Act to enable the Court of Chancery in Ireland to appoint other Persons to act under the Family Settlement of the Marquis of Donegall and Earl of Belfast, bearing Date the Twenty-eighth of October One thousand eight hundred and twenty-two, in the Place of Thomas Ball and Thomas Ellis deceased.
Fawcett's Estate Act 1837	7 Will. 4 & 1 Vict. c. 39 Pr.	15 July 1837
An Act for vesting Settled Estates in the Township of Beadingley-cum-Burley in the Parish of Leeds in the County of York, of which John Henry Fawcett Esquire is Tenant for Life, in Trustees for Sale, and for investing the Monies to be produced thereby in the Purchase of other Estates, to be settled to the same Uses.
Bevan's Estate Act 1837	7 Will. 4 & 1 Vict. c. 40 Pr.	15 July 1837
An Act for empowering the Trustees of the Will, as to his Real Estate, of Silvanus Bevan Esquire, deceased, to sell the Freehold Estates in the Counties of Wilts and Berks devised by the same Will, and for laying out the Money to arise from such Sale in the Purchase of other Estates, to be settled to the same Uses.
King Edward VI Free Grammar School Birmingham Act 1837 or the Birmingham Free School Estate Act 1837 (repealed)	7 Will. 4 & 1 Vict. c. 41 Pr.	15 July 1837
An Act to alter and amend an Act passed in the Second Year of the Reign of His late Majesty King William the Fourth, intituled "An Act to enable the Governors of the Possessions, Revenues, and Goods of the Free Grammar School of King Edward the Sixth in Birmingham in the County of Warwick to erect a Schoolhouse, Masters Houses, and other suitable Accommodations for the said School, and to extend the Objects of the Charity; and for other Purposes." (Note: King Edward VI's Free Grammar School Act 1831 (1 & 2 Will. 4. c. 17)) (Repealed by Birmingham (King Edward the Sixth) School Act 1900 (63 & 64 Vict. c. lxiv))
Marquis of Bute's Estate Act 1837	7 Will. 4 & 1 Vict. c. 42 Pr.	15 July 1837
An Act for exchanging Part of the Settled Estates of the Most Honourable the Marquis of Bute and Earl of Dumfries in the County of Glamorgan, in England, for Estates of the said Marquis in the Counties of Ayr, Wigton, and Bute, in Scotland; and for other Purposes.
Francis Adams's Marriage Settlement Act 1837	7 Will. 4 & 1 Vict. c. 43 Pr.	17 July 1837
An Act for extending the Powers of Sale and Exchange contained in the Marriage Settlement of Francis Adams the younger, Esquire; and for other Purposes.
Alepsons' Naturalization Act 1837 (Note: This act was not printed by the King's Printer.)	7 Will. 4 & 1 Vict. c. 44 Pr.	18 March 1837
An Act for naturalizing Martin Alepson and Matthew Alepson.
Michael Castelli's Naturalization Act 1837	7 Will. 4 & 1 Vict. c. 45 Pr.	18 March 1837
An Act for naturalizing Michael Castelli.
Frank Castelli's Naturalization Act 1837	7 Will. 4 & 1 Vict. c. 46 Pr.	18 March 1837
An Act for naturalizing Frank Castelli.
Salamé's Naturalization Act 1837	7 Will. 4 & 1 Vict. c. 47 Pr.	18 March 1837
An Act for naturalizing Abraham Victor Salamé.
Bernard Mette's Naturalization Act 1837	7 Will. 4 & 1 Vict. c. 48 Pr.	21 April 1837
An Act for naturalizing Bernard Mette.
Henry Mette's Naturalization Act 1837	7 Will. 4 & 1 Vict. c. 49 Pr.	21 April 1837
An Act for naturalizing Henry Anthony Mette.
Becker's Naturalization Act 1837	7 Will. 4 & 1 Vict. c. 50 Pr.	21 April 1837
An Act for naturalizing John Becker.
Gardiner's Divorce Act 1837	7 Will. 4 & 1 Vict. c. 51 Pr.	5 May 1837
An Act to dissolve the Marriage of Charles Gardiner Esquire with Harriet Maria Elizabeth his now Wife, and to enable him to marry again; and for other Purposes.
Ernesto Rapallo's Naturalization Act 1837	7 Will. 4 & 1 Vict. c. 52 Pr.	5 May 1837
An Act for naturalizing Ernesto Domenico Damiano Rapallo.
Angelo Solari's Naturalization Act 1837	7 Will. 4 & 1 Vict. c. 53 Pr.	5 May 1837
An Act for naturalizing Angelo Antonio Solari.
Hales' Naturalization Act 1837	7 Will. 4 & 1 Vict. c. 54 Pr.	8 June 1837
An Act for naturalizing Edmee Nicole Pulcherie Felice Hales and her infant Daughter.
Huth's Naturalization Act 1837	7 Will. 4 & 1 Vict. c. 55 Pr.	10 June 1837
An Act for naturalizing Charles Frederick Huth.
Meinertzhagen's Naturalization Act 1837	7 Will. 4 & 1 Vict. c. 56 Pr.	10 June 1837
An Act for naturalizing Daniel Meinertzhagen.
Martin's Naturalization Act 1837 (Note: This act was not printed by the Queen's Printer.)	7 Will. 4 & 1 Vict. c. 57 Pr.	30 June 1837
An Act for naturalizing Andrew Martin.
Actons' Naturalization Act 1837	7 Will. 4 & 1 Vict. c. 58 Pr.	15 July 1837
An Act for naturalizing Dame Marie Louise Pelline De Dalberg Acton and her infant Son Sir John Emerich Edward Dalberg Acton Baronet.

=== Sources ===
- The Statutes of the United Kingdom of Great Britain and Ireland, 7 Will. IV. & 1 Vict. 1837. London. 1837 – via Internet Archive.
- The Statutes of the United Kingdom of Great Britain and Ireland, 7 Will. IV. & 1 Vict. 1837. London. 1837 – via Google Books.
- A Collection of the Public General Statutes Passed in the Seventh Year of the Reign of His Majesty King William the Fourth and the First Year of the Reign of Her Majesty Queen Victoria, 1837. London: Eyre & Spottiswoode. 1837 – via Internet Archive.
- Journal of the House of Commons (PDF). Vol. 92. London: His Majesty's Stationery Office. pp. 3–671 – via parliament.uk.
- Chronological Table of and Index to the Statutes. Vol. 1: To the End of the Session 59 Vict. Sess. 2 (1895) (13th ed.). London: Her Majesty's Stationery Office. 1896. pp. 287–290 – via Google Books.

== 1 & 2 Vict. ==
The first session of the 13th Parliament of the United Kingdom, which met from 15 November 1837 until 16 August 1838.

=== Public general acts ===
Short title	Citation	Royal assent
Long title
Commissions of the Peace Continuance Act 1837 (repealed)	1 & 2 Vict. c. 1	4 December 1837
An Act to continue for Six Calendar Months all such Commissions of the Peace as were in force at the Time of the Decease of His late Majesty King William the Fourth, and as have not been superseded, determined, or made void during the Reign of Her present Majesty. (Repealed by Statute Law Revision Act 1874 (No. 2) (37 & 38 Vict. c. 96))
Civil List Act 1837	1 & 2 Vict. c. 2	23 December 1837
An Act for the Support of Her Majesty's Household, and of the Honour and Dignity of the Crown of the United Kingdom of Great Britain and Ireland.
Slave Compensation Act 1837 or the Slavery Compensation Act 1837 or the Abolition of Slavery Act 1837 (repealed)	1 & 2 Vict. c. 3	23 December 1837
An Act to carry into further Execution the Provisions of an Act (Note: Slavery Abolition Act 1833 (3 & 4 Will. 4. c. 73)) for completing the full Payment of Compensation to Owners of Slaves upon the Abolition of Slavery. (Repealed by Statute Law Revision Act 1874 (No. 2) (37 & 38 Vict. c. 96))
Quarter Sessions Act 1837 (repealed)	1 & 2 Vict. c. 4	23 December 1837
An Act to remove Doubts as to summoning Juries at Adjourned Quarter Sessions of the Peace. (Repealed by Courts Act 1971 (c. 23))
Declaration by Quakers, etc. Act 1837 (repealed)	1 & 2 Vict. c. 5	23 December 1837
An Act for the Relief of Quakers, Moravians, and Separatists elected to Municipal Offices. (Repealed by Promissory Oaths Act 1871 (34 & 35 Vict. c. 48))
Conveyance of Prisoners (Ireland) Act 1837 (repealed)	1 & 2 Vict. c. 6	23 December 1837
An Act to regulate the Expences of conveying Prisoners in Ireland. (Repealed by Constabulary (Ireland) Act 1839 (2 & 3 Vict. c. 75))
Houses of Parliament Act 1837	1 & 2 Vict. c. 7	23 December 1837
An Act to enable the Commissioners of Her Majesty's Woods, Forests, Land Revenues, Works, and Buildings to purchase Ground and Tenements required to complete the Site for the new Houses of Parliament.

=== Private acts ===
Short title	Citation	Royal assent
Long title
Patry's Naturalization Act 1837 (Note: This act was not printed by the Queen's Printer)	1 & 2 Vict. c. 36 Pr. (Note: For 1 & 2 Vict. cc. 1 to 35 Pr. see 1838.)	23 December 1837
An Act for naturalizing James Paltry.
Meugens' Naturalization Act 1837	1 & 2 Vict. c. 37 Pr.	23 December 1837
An Act for naturalizing Peter Joseph Meugens.
Ionides' Naturalization Act 1837	1 & 2 Vict. c. 38 Pr.	23 December 1837
An Act for naturalizing Alexander Constantine Ionides.
Schwann's Naturalization Act 1837	1 & 2 Vict. c. 39 Pr.	23 December 1837
An Act for naturalizing Frederick Schwann.
Saffran's Naturalization Act 1837	1 & 2 Vict. c. 40 Pr.	23 December 1837
An Act for naturalizing Henry Joseph Edward Saffran.

=== Sources ===
- The Statutes of the United Kingdom of Great Britain and Ireland, 1 & 2 Victoria. 1838. 1838 – via Internet Archive.
- The Statutes of the United Kingdom of Great Britain and Ireland, 1 & 2 Victoria. 1838. 1838 – via Google Books.
- A Collection of the Public General Statutes Passed in the Seventh Year of the Reign of His Majesty King William the Fourth and the First Year of the Reign of Her Majesty Queen Victoria, 1837, 1838. 1838 – via Internet Archive.
- Journal of the House of Commons (PDF). Vol. 93. London: His Majesty's Stationery Office. pp. 5–886 – via parliament.uk.
- Chronological Table of and Index to the Statutes. Vol. 1: To the End of the Session 59 Vict. Sess. 2 (1895) (13th ed.). London: Her Majesty's Stationery Office. 1896. pp. 290–295 – via Google Books.

== See also ==
- List of acts of the Parliament of the United Kingdom
